= The Caine Mutiny Court-Martial =

The Caine Mutiny Court-Martial may refer to:

- The Caine Mutiny Court-Martial (play), a play by Herman Wouk, adapted from his novel The Caine Mutiny
- The Caine Mutiny Court-Martial (1955 film), a TV play based on the play
- The Caine Mutiny Court-Martial (2023 film), an American film based on the play

== See also ==
- The Caine Mutiny (disambiguation)
