= The Caine Mutiny (disambiguation) =

The Caine Mutiny is a 1952 novel by Herman Wouk.

The Caine Mutiny may also refer to:

- The Caine Mutiny (1954 film), an American film based on the novel
- The Caine Mutiny (1959 film), an Australian TV play based on the play The Caine Mutiny Court-Martial

== See also ==
- The Caine Mutiny Court-Martial (disambiguation)
- "The Canine Mutiny", an episode of the American animated television series The Simpsons
