= Claremont Avenue =

Avenue in Manhattan, New York

Coordinates: 40°48′44.83″N 73°57′43.02″W

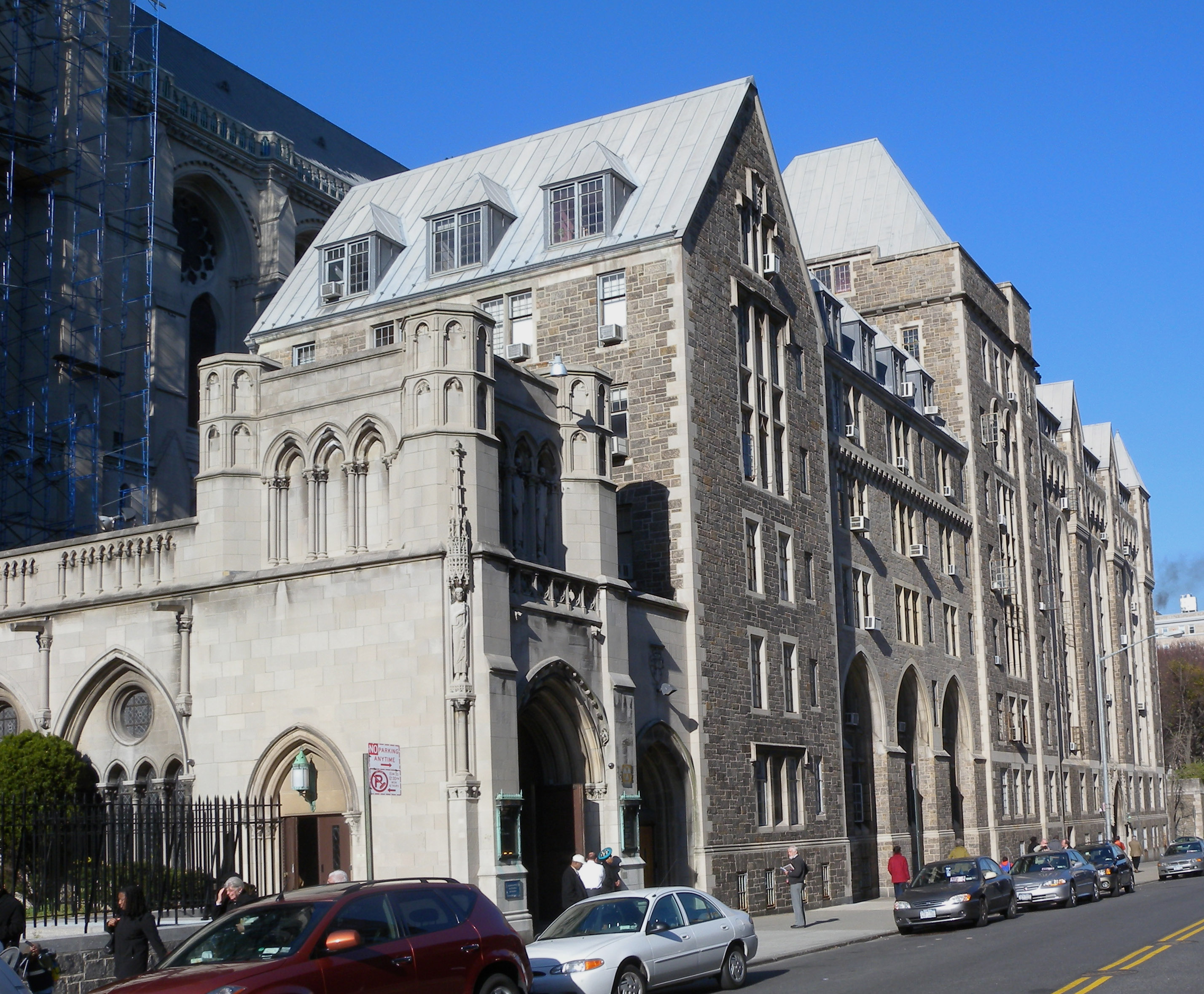
Riverside Church entrance on Claremont (foreground); a Union Theological Seminary dormitory is directly behind it

Claremont Avenue is a short avenue in the Morningside Heights neighborhood of Manhattan, New York City. It begins at 116th Street and runs north for a length of eleven blocks until it ends at Tiemann Place (the western segment of 127th Street).

== Structures ==
South of 120th Street, the eastern side of Claremont Avenue features the heavily fortified backside of the Barnard College campus. The western side features various Columbia University professors' apartments, as well as Columbia and Barnard undergraduate residence halls.

North of 120th Street, the west side of Claremont Avenue contains Riverside Church and a dormitory of the Union Theological Seminary, and the east side contains the seminary itself. Beyond this, the street passes along Sakura Park to the west, and the International House of New York also to the west. The Manhattan School of Music has occupied the former Juilliard School building at 130 Claremont Avenue since Juilliard moved to Lincoln Center in 1969. For the northernmost few blocks, apartment buildings line the street. An outcropping of the Manhattan schist interrupts the row of buildings on the west side of the street between La Salle Street and Tiemann Place.

The intersection of 116th Street and Claremont has been cited as one of the windiest in New York City. Strong winds from the direction of Riverside Park are commonly believed to be "funneled" by the opposing curved façades of The Paterno and The Colosseum.

== In popular culture ==
The protagonists in F. Scott Fitzgerald's 1922 novel The Beautiful and Damned, Anthony and Gloria Gilbert, moved into an apartment on Claremont Avenue in the novel's last book.
