= 825 Fifth Avenue =

Apartment building in Manhattan, New York

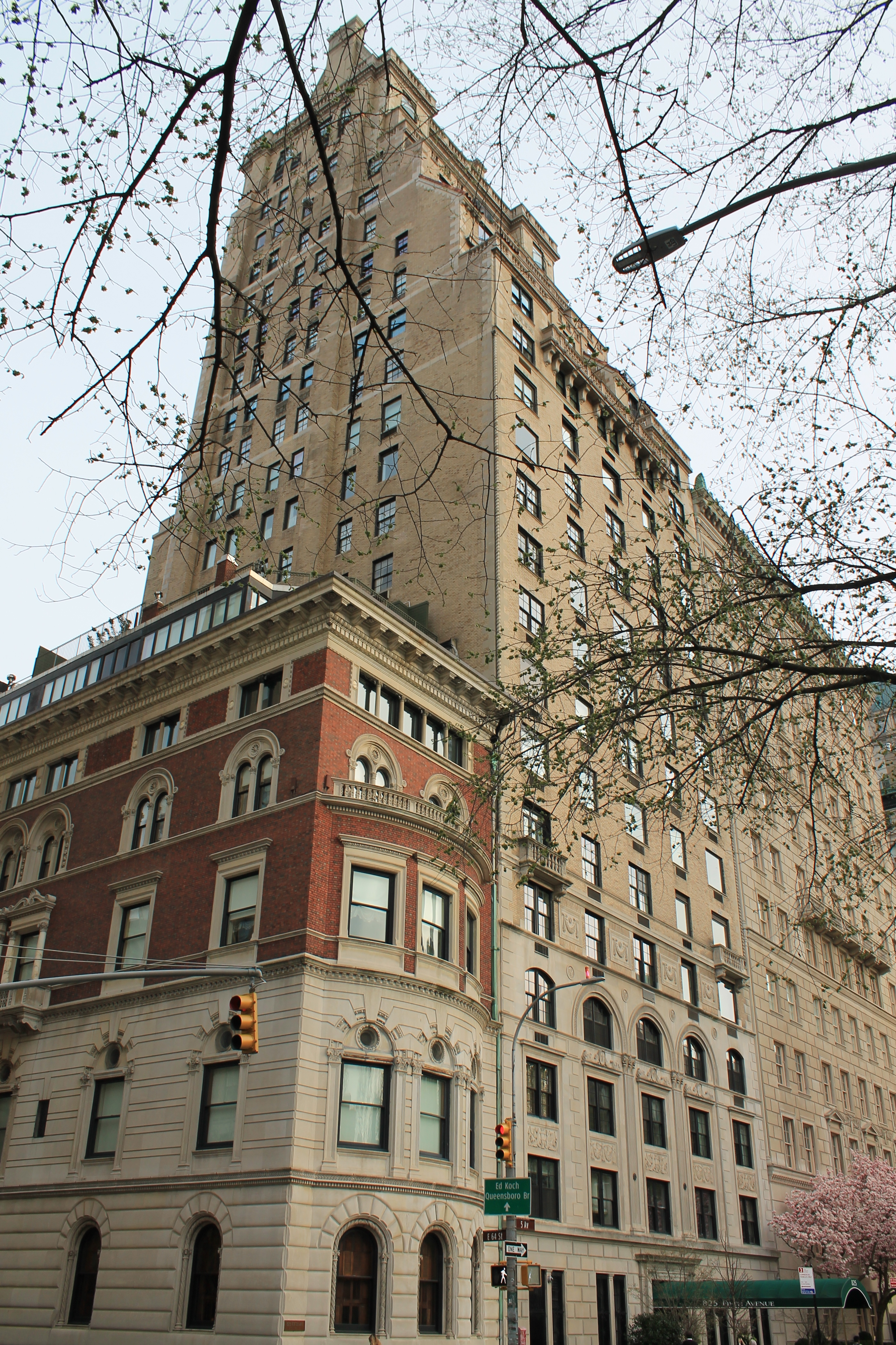
- April 2021

- Location within Manhattan 825 Fifth Avenue (New York City) 825 Fifth Avenue (New York)

General information
- Status: Completed
- Type: Residential
- Architectural style: Art Deco
- Location: 825 Fifth Avenue, New York, NY 10065, United States
- Coordinates: 40.7671°N 73.9706°W
- Construction started: December 1, 1926
- Opening: October 5, 1927
- Cost: $1 million
- Owner: 825 FIFTH AVE CORP

Technical details
- Floor count: 23
- Lifts/elevators: 2

Design and construction
- Architect: JER Carpenter
- Developer: Paterno Brothers

Other information
- Number of units: 64 apartments

825 Fifth Avenue is a luxury apartment building located on Fifth Avenue between East 63rd and East 64th Streets in the Lenox Hill neighborhood of Manhattan in New York City. It was built by the Paterno Brothers.

== Design ==
The 23-floor building was erected in 1926-1927 as a cooperative with 77 apartments, but today it has only 64 units. Developer Joseph Paterno initially opted to list the building as an apartment-hotel so as to legally build 23 stories as opposed to only 15 stories restricted for apartment houses. The building has a notable red-tiled steep-pitched roof, making it visible from a long distance. When it was built, The Real Estate Record & Guide praised the $1 million building's "unusually striking upper-floor effect." By 2025, 825 Fifth Avenue was one of three apartment buildings on the Upper East Side with its own restaurant, the others being 1 East 66th Street and 960 Fifth Avenue.
