= The Caine Mutiny =

1951 novel by Herman Wouk

- First edition cover
- Author: Herman Wouk
- Cover artist: John Hull
- Language: English
- Publisher: Doubleday
- Publication date: March 19, 1951
- Media type: Print (hardback and paperback)
- Pages: 498

The Caine Mutiny is a 1951 novel by American author Herman Wouk. The novel grew out of Wouk's personal experiences aboard two destroyer-minesweepers in the Pacific Theater in World War II. Among its themes, it deals with the moral and ethical decisions made at sea by ship captains and other officers. The mutiny of the title is legalistic, not violent, and takes place during Typhoon Cobra, in December 1944. The court-martial that results provides the dramatic climax to the plot.

The novel won the 1952 Pulitzer Prize for Fiction. Wouk adapted his novel into a stage play, The Caine Mutiny Court-Martial, in 1953. The Caine Mutiny was later adapted into a 1954 film of the same name, an American TV film in 1955 and an Australian TV film in 1959, both based on the play; and a similarly named 2023 film reboot.

== Plot summary ==
The story is told through the eyes of Willis Seward "Willie" Keith, a callow young graduate of Princeton University. Following a mediocre living as a nightclub piano player, he signs up for midshipman school at Columbia University with the United States Navy to avoid being drafted into the United States Army during World War II. He endures inner conflicts over his relationships with his domineering mother and with May Wynn, a beautiful red-haired nightclub singer, the daughter of Italian immigrants, whom he accompanies on piano in their nightclub performances. After barely surviving a series of misadventures that earn him the highest number of demerits in his class, Keith is commissioned as an ensign in the Naval Reserve and assigned to the destroyer minesweeper U.S.S. Caine, an obsolete warship converted from a post-World War I-era destroyer.

Arriving late to Hawaii, Keith misses his ship when it leaves on a combat assignment. While waiting for transportation to catch up with it, he plays piano in the evenings for an admiral who takes a shine to him. Finally galvanized after reading a last letter from his father, who has died of melanoma, Keith reports aboard the Caine. The ensign immediately disapproves of the ship's decaying condition and slovenly crew. He attributes these conditions to a slackness of discipline by the ship's longtime captain, Lieutenant Commander William De Vriess.

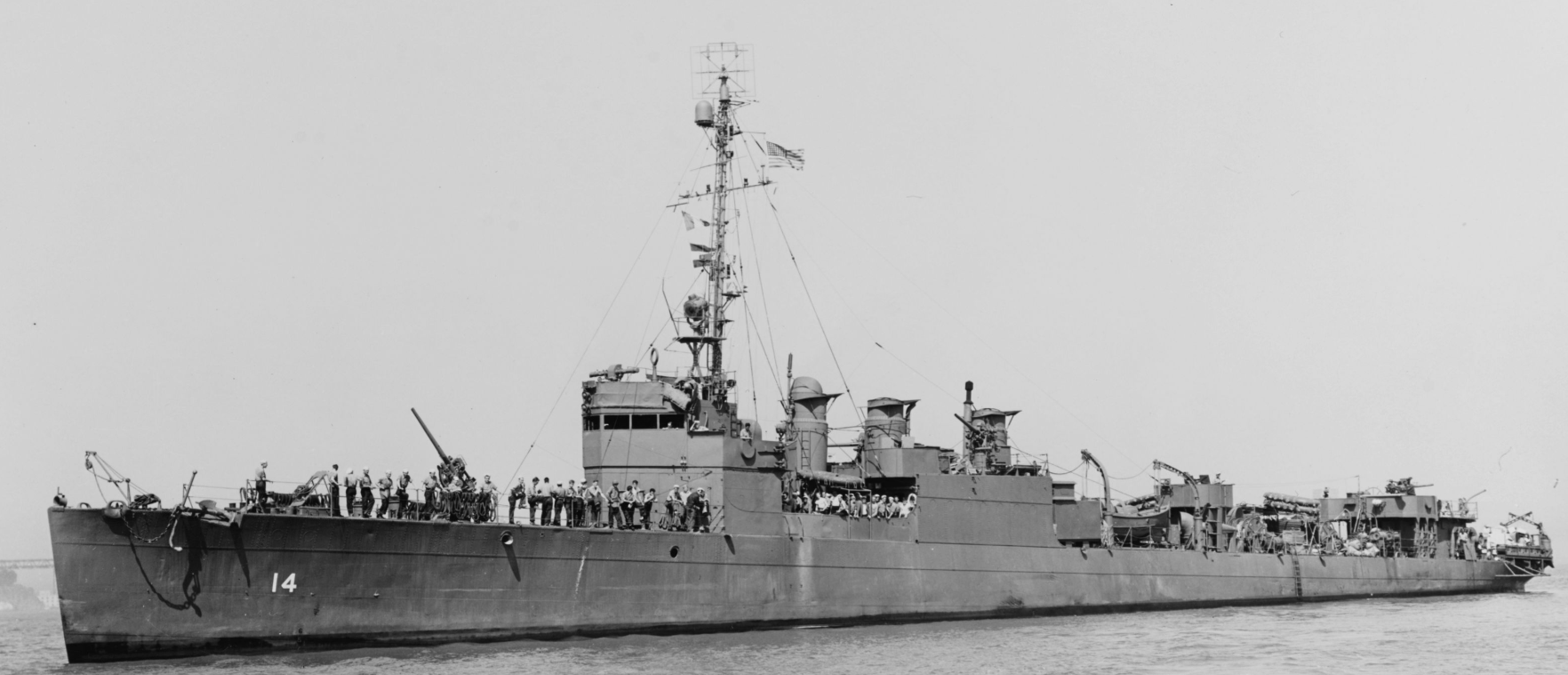
Wouk's ship destroyer/minesweeper USS Zane after repair at Mare Island, San Francisco, September 1943: Note the forward antiaircraft gun and three smokestacks.

Keith and another ensign are consigned to a miserably small and overheated shack on deck, and stumble through their early days on board. Keith's lackadaisical attitude toward what he considers menial duties brings about a humiliating clash with De Vriess when Keith forgets to decode a time-sensitive communiqué. Shortly thereafter, De Vriess is relieved, after over five years at the helm of the Caine, by Lieutenant Commander Philip Francis Queeg, a strong, by-the-book figure, whom Keith at first believes to be just what the rusty Caine and its rough-necked crew needs. Queeg, though, has never handled a ship like this before, and he soon makes errors of judgement that he is unwilling to admit, finding ways to lay blame on others. The Caine is sent to San Francisco for an overhaul, which is interrupted by orders to return to Pearl Harbor, Hawaii, for further assignment. Before the ship departs, Queeg browbeats his officers into selling their liquor rations to him, and in a breach of regulations, smuggles the liquor off the ship. When the crate is inadvertently lost overboard during the transition, Queeg blackmails Keith into paying for it. While on leave, Keith sees May Wynn, who is now working on achieving her degree at Hunter College, in addition to continuing to perform as a singer, and they spend a romantic weekend together in Yosemite. Keith is still divided between his love for her and her lower social class. He resolves to let the relationship die when his leave is over by not replying to her letters.

As the Caine begins its missions in the Pacific under his command, Queeg begins to lose the respect of the crew and the loyalty of the wardroom through a series of increasingly unusual incidents, including running aground and damaging another ship, and later running over and severing the cable to a valuable towed gunnery target, which he blames on John Stilwell, the helmsman; these two incidents reveal his cowardice, paranoia, and inability to accept responsibility. During the following invasion of Kwajalein, Queeg is ordered to escort low-lying landing craft to their line of departure. Instead, Queeg orders the crew to throw over a yellow dye marker to mark the spot, and hastily directs the Caine away from the battle area. The officers nickname him "Old Yellowstain," and he becomes increasingly isolated from the other officers, who come to dread his rages and unreasonable demands, which often entail loss of leave privileges, and at one low point, a 48-hour moratorium on drinking water while the ship is sweltering near the equator. Keith realizes that De Vriess was a far more competent, effective, and fair-minded leader, and inwardly regrets his original, naive judgements of both captains.

Prior to the arrival of the Caine in San Francisco, Queeg confined Stilwell to the ship for six months after catching him reading while on watch, a punishment that Keith and other officers regarded as excessive. In San Francisco, Stilwell arranges to have a relative send him a telegram faking a death in his family. Keith and executive officer Lieutenant Stephen Maryk see through Stilwell's ruse, but nevertheless allow him a shore leave pass, contradicting Queeg's orders. Suspicious of Stilwell's excuse, Queeg requests the Red Cross confirm the death. Months later, the Red Cross exposes Stilwell's lie, and Queeg orders him court-martialed by Keith and two other officers, making it clear to them that he wants Stilwell to receive a bad conduct discharge from the Navy. Instead, the three officers give Stilwell an extremely minor punishment, enraging Queeg and leading him to institute punitive measures against the ship's officers.

Queeg's next act of paranoia begins when over half of a prized container of strawberries is discovered to be empty. He concocts elaborate and time-consuming procedures in which to catch the thief. These occupy all of the officers and crew for long hours and further erode confidence in and respect for the captain. When Queeg's pet theory is finally decisively flouted, he disappears into his cabin, leaving the ship in Maryk's hands for days.

The intellectual communications officer, Lieutenant Tom Keefer, who coined the "Yellowstain" nickname, suggests to Maryk that Queeg might be mentally ill. Keefer directs Maryk to "Section 184" of the Navy Regulations, under which a subordinate can relieve a commanding officer in extraordinary circumstances. Maryk, a dutiful and dependable executive officer who brooks no public criticisms of Queeg, nevertheless begins to keep a secret log of Queeg's actions, and ultimately decides to bring them to the attention of Admiral Halsey, commanding the Third Fleet, when Halsey's flagship and the Caine are anchored at the Ulithi atoll. Keefer agrees to accompany Maryk, but then gets cold feet and backs out, and both men return to their ship without ever meeting the admiral.

Soon afterward, the Caine is caught in Typhoon Cobra, an ordeal that sinks three destroyers and threatens to overwhelm the Caine. At the height of the storm, Queeg's paralysis convinces Maryk that he must relieve the captain of command to prevent the loss of the ship. Keith, as officer of the deck, supports the decision. Maryk turns Caine into the wind and rides out the storm.

Maryk is tried by court-martial for "conduct to the prejudice of good order and discipline" instead of "making a mutiny". Keith and Stilwell, helmsman during the typhoon, are also to be tried, depending on the outcome of Maryk's trial. In the courtroom, Keefer distances himself from any responsibility for the relief of command from Queeg. Lieutenant Barney Greenwald, a naval aviator who is an attorney in civilian life, represents Maryk. Greenwald's opinion, after Queeg is found to be sane by three Navy psychiatrists, is that Maryk was legally unjustified in relieving Queeg, but he decides to take the case after deducing Keefer's background role in the crisis.

During the trial, Greenwald unrelentingly cross-examines Queeg until the increasingly defensive Queeg starts to display the erratic and unreasonable behavior that the officers had previously reported. Queeg's performance results in Maryk's acquittal and the dropping of charges against Keith and Stilwell. Maryk, who had aspired to a career in the regular Navy, is sent to command a landing craft infantry, a humiliation that ruins his naval career ambitions. Queeg is transferred to a naval supply depot in Iowa.

At a party celebrating both the acquittal and Keefer's success at selling his novel to a publisher, an intoxicated Greenwald arrives late, and calls Keefer out as a coward. He tells the gathering that he feels ashamed of having destroyed Queeg on the stand because Queeg and all other regular armed-forces officers have performed the necessary duty of guarding America in peacetime, which Keefer and others view as work that is beneath them. Greenwald states that the officers' disdain and disrespect for Queeg is what led to his inability to take action during the typhoon. Greenwald concludes by saying that officers like Queeg kept Greenwald's Jewish mother from being "melted down into a bar of soap" by the Nazis. He calls Keefer, not Maryk, "the true author of 'The Caine Mutiny,'" and throws a glass of champagne, "the yellow wine", into Keefer's face — bringing the term "Old Yellowstain" full circle.

Keith returns to the Caine during the last days of the Okinawa campaign as its executive officer. Keefer is now the captain, and his behavior as captain is similar to Queeg's. The Caine is struck by a kamikaze, an event in which Keith discovers that he has matured into a naval officer. Keefer panics and orders the ship abandoned, but Keith remains aboard and calmly rescues the situation by heroically dousing the fires.

Keefer, discharged after the war ends, is ashamed of his cowardly behavior during the kamikaze attack, especially because his half-brother Roland has died saving his own ship, also from kamikaze fire. Keith is promoted as captain of the Caine. He receives a Bronze Star Medal for his actions following the kamikaze explosion, and a letter of reprimand for his part in supporting the unlawful relief of Queeg. The findings of the court-martial are overturned after a review by higher naval authorities, but Keith, in retrospect, agrees that their actions were legally unjustified and probably unnecessary.

Captain Keith keeps the Caine afloat during another typhoon and brings it to Bayonne, New Jersey, for decommissioning after the end of the war. His first desire and primary aim upon departing the Caine and the conclusion of his duties is to find May Wynn and ask her to marry him. His wartime experiences have finally crystallized his desire and decision, but over a year and a half have passed since they last saw each other. He discovers she is in a musical and romantic partnership with a popular bandleader, has dyed her hair, and is now performing under her real name, Marie Minotti. Keith surprises her when he appears unexpectedly at the club where she performs, and makes his case with ardent conviction. The book ends with their romantic situation unresolved; Minotti must put her past heartbreak over Keith, as well as her current relationship behind her, and assess whether she can trust what her heart tells her, but the reader is left with the sense that the two will finally unite, and the book closes as confetti from the victory parade in the streets settles on the shoulders of the last captain of the Caine.

== Historical background ==
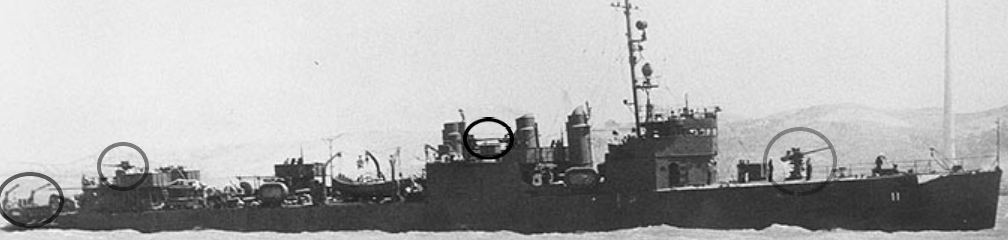
Actual Clemson-class destroyer/minesweeper with three stacks in 1945: Shown circled left to right, squared stern with cranes, guns aft, midship and forward. In the center is the missing fourth stack.

Wouk served during World War II aboard two destroyer-minesweepers (DMSs) converted from World War I-era Clemson-class destroyers, USS Zane being the first and USS Southard being the second. (Wouk uses the latter name for one of his characters in the novel, Captain Randolph Patterson Southard. Also, in an allusion to history professor Jacques Barzun of his alma mater, Columbia University, Wouk also has Queeg refer to a previous assignment he had on a ship named Barzun.) USS Caine is a fictional Clemson-class DMS conversion.

The Clemson class was named for Midshipman Henry A. Clemson, lost at sea on December 8, 1846, during the Mexican War, when the brig USS Somers capsized off Veracruz in a sudden squall while chasing a blockade runner. In November 1842, the Somers was the scene of the only recorded conspiracy to mutiny in U.S. naval history when three members of the crew — a midshipman, a boatswain's mate, and a seaman — were clapped in irons and subsequently hanged for planning a takeover of the vessel.

Many of the incidents and plot details are autobiographical. Like both Keith and Keefer, Wouk rose through the ship's wardroom of Zane from assistant communications officer to first lieutenant. As executive officer of the Southard, Wouk was recommended to captain the ship home to the United States at the end of the war before it was beached at Okinawa in September 1945, during Typhoon Louise.

Wouk was serving aboard the USS Zane in December 1944, and though his ship did not experience much or any of the effects of Typhoon Cobra, as did the fictional Caine during this time, the American Third Fleet had many ships lost or damaged in the Philippine Sea during the storm. The Zane, however, was grounded during a heavy rain squall while disembarking her troops in the Russell Islands around June 1943, and while serving as executive officer, Wouk offered to captain the Clemson-class DMS USS Southard home in September 1945, before she was grounded off Okinawa by Typhoon Louise, a serious storm that damaged over 20 American ships.

The novel also describes the fictional Caine as having been struck by a kamikaze, which caused relatively minor damage, while Keefer was in command during the Battle of Lingayen Gulf. This did in fact happen to the Southard on January 6, 1945, although Wouk was not aboard at the time, as he was still serving on the Zane.

The name for the USS Caine came from the story in Genesis of Cain killing his brother Abel, and Cain's resulting banishment, nomadic life, and isolation. While supporting the efforts of the minesweepers and underwater demolition teams, another Clemson-class destroyer, the USS Kane, served in the Marshall Islands and at Saipan in the Marianas at the same time as Wouk's ship USS Zane. The destroyer USS Kane may also have been an initial inspiration for the name of Wouk's fictional ship.

== Reception ==
The Caine Mutiny reached the top of the New York Times best seller list on August 12, 1951, after 17 weeks on the list, replacing From Here to Eternity. It remained atop the list for 33 weeks until March 30, 1952, when it was replaced by My Cousin Rachel. It moved back to first place on May 25, 1952, and remained another 15 weeks, before being supplanted by The Silver Chalice, and last appeared on August 23, 1953, after 122 weeks on the list.

== Adaptations ==
In 1954, Columbia Pictures released the film The Caine Mutiny, starring Humphrey Bogart as Queeg in a widely acclaimed performance that earned him the third and final Academy Award nomination of his career.

After the novel's success, Wouk adapted the court-martial sequence into a full-length, two-act Broadway play, The Caine Mutiny Court Martial. Directed by Charles Laughton, it was a success on the stage in 1954, opening five months before the release of the film and starring Lloyd Nolan as Queeg, John Hodiak as Maryk, and Henry Fonda as Greenwald. It has been revived twice on Broadway, and was presented on television live in 1955, under the direction of Franklyn J. Schaffner, and again on Australian television in 1959.

In 1988, Wouk's play was adapted as a made-for-television film directed by Robert Altman starring Brad Davis as Queeg.

Also in 1988, the stage script was translated into Chinese by Ying Ruocheng, a famous Chinese actor, director, playwright, and vice minister of culture. At Ying's invitation, Charlton Heston, who directed the 1984 play, directed the translated play in a successful run at the Beijing People's Art Theatre, opening on October 18, 1988, starring Chinese actor Zhu Xu as Queeg, Ren Baoxian as Maryk, and Xiao Peng as Greenwald. The play was revived in 2006, again under Heston, and has been revived there twice more (2009, 2012) since his death.

In 2023, a new film adaptation of the stage script, directed by William Friedkin and starring Kiefer Sutherland as Queeg, was released on Paramount+. It was Friedkin's final film project, and was released on September 7, 2023, a little over a month after Friedkin's death.

== See also ==
- "The Canine Mutiny" – an episode of The Simpsons
- "The Novocaine Mutiny" – an episode of M*A*S*H
- Sea in culture
- "Queeg" – an episode of the UK sitcom series Red Dwarf
- Tootsie, 1982 film starring Dustin Hoffman: In the beginning of the movie, Hoffman's character is on stage reciting Barney Greenwald's monologue from the end of the book.
- Mister Roberts - A comedy-drama film, it came out a year prior, with a similar theme about a mutiny against an increasingly rigid and paranoid commander.
