= Sakura Park =

Public park in Manhattan, New York

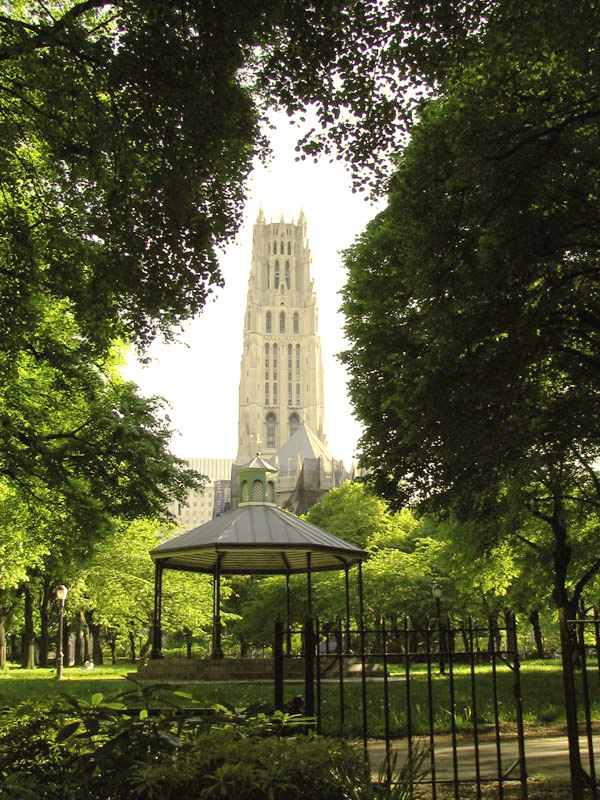
- Looking downtown, the gazebo in the foreground and the tower of Riverside Church behind it
- Interactive map of Sakura Park
- Type: Urban park
- Location: Manhattan, New York City
- Coordinates: 40°48′47″N 73°57′44″W
- Area: 2.067 acres (0.836 ha)
- Operator: NYC Parks
- Status: Open all year
- Public transit: Subway: to 125th Street; Bus: M4, M5, M11, M60 SBS, M104

Sakura Park is a public park located in the Morningside Heights neighborhood in Manhattan, New York City, north of West 122nd Street between Riverside Drive and Claremont Avenue. Situated between Riverside Church on the south, the Manhattan School of Music on the east, Grant's Tomb and Riverside Park on the west, and International House on its northern side, it is operated by the New York City Department of Parks and Recreation (NYC Parks).

== History ==
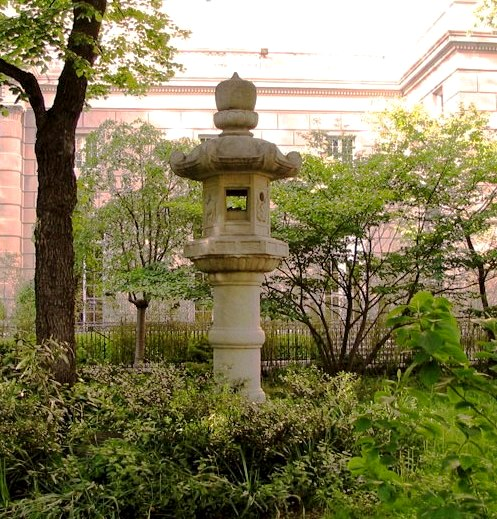
The stone lantern given to the City of New York by the City of Tokyo, with the International House of New York in the background

The park was originally called Claremont Park after Claremont Avenue, which runs on its east side. The land, originally owned by John D. Rockefeller, was purchased by the City of New York in 1896 for use as an extension of Riverside Park. In 1909, the Committee of Japanese Residents of New York donated 2,500 cherry blossom trees to the city, to commemorate the Hudson–Fulton Celebration. Only 700 trees arrived at Claremont Park, as the steamship carrying the trees had been lost at sea and most of the plants began to rot. In 1912, three years after its scheduled arrival, the surviving trees were planted in Riverside Park and Central Park, as well as the area surrounding Sakura Park. The park was subsequently renamed Sakura Park.

As part of the construction of adjacent Riverside Church, Sakura Park underwent landscaping with $350,000 in funds from John D. Rockefeller Jr. in 1932. The renovation was completed two years later.

In 1960, another gift was given to the park, this time by the City of Tokyo in the form of a stone lantern (tōrō), when New York City became her sister city. The then Crown Prince, and later Emperor of Japan, Akihito, was in attendance during the official dedication on October 10 of that year. Crown Prince Akihito would later rededicate the lantern with his princess in 1987.

== Features ==
General Daniel Adams Butterfield, author of the bugle call, Taps, which is a standard component for concluding for US military funerals, stands on a rock pedestal as a larger-than-life-sized bronze statue by Gutzon Borglum—who is said to have been so annoyed by commissioning committees numerous demands for changes to the sculpture, that he marked his signature on the top of the general's head, claiming that this was the single aspect the committee had not required him to change. The statue is oriented such that it faces Grant's Tomb across Riverside Drive and thus it appears Butterfield is looking at the tomb of his fellow Civil War general and the president in whose cabinet he served as the Assistant Treasurer of the United States.

The landscaping is dominated by two walks lined with mature linden trees, the branches meet overhead forming a leafy arcade. Between the two walks is a lawn, headed by a gazebo and planted with cherry trees. When the cherry trees bloom, people of Japanese ancestry come to celebrate Hanami and spread picnic blankets under the trees. The cherry bloom is preceded in spring by bulbs, beginning with snowdrops and continuing through tulips.

Directly to the east is Claremont Avenue, which is dramatically lower in elevation. A buttressed retaining wall extends the length of the park along Claremont Avenue. The wall is an ivy-festooned copy of Kenilworth Abbey's wall in England. It was built in the 1930s by the Olmsted Brothers firm as part of a park redesign.
