= The Colosseum (Manhattan) =

Apartment building in Manhattan, New York

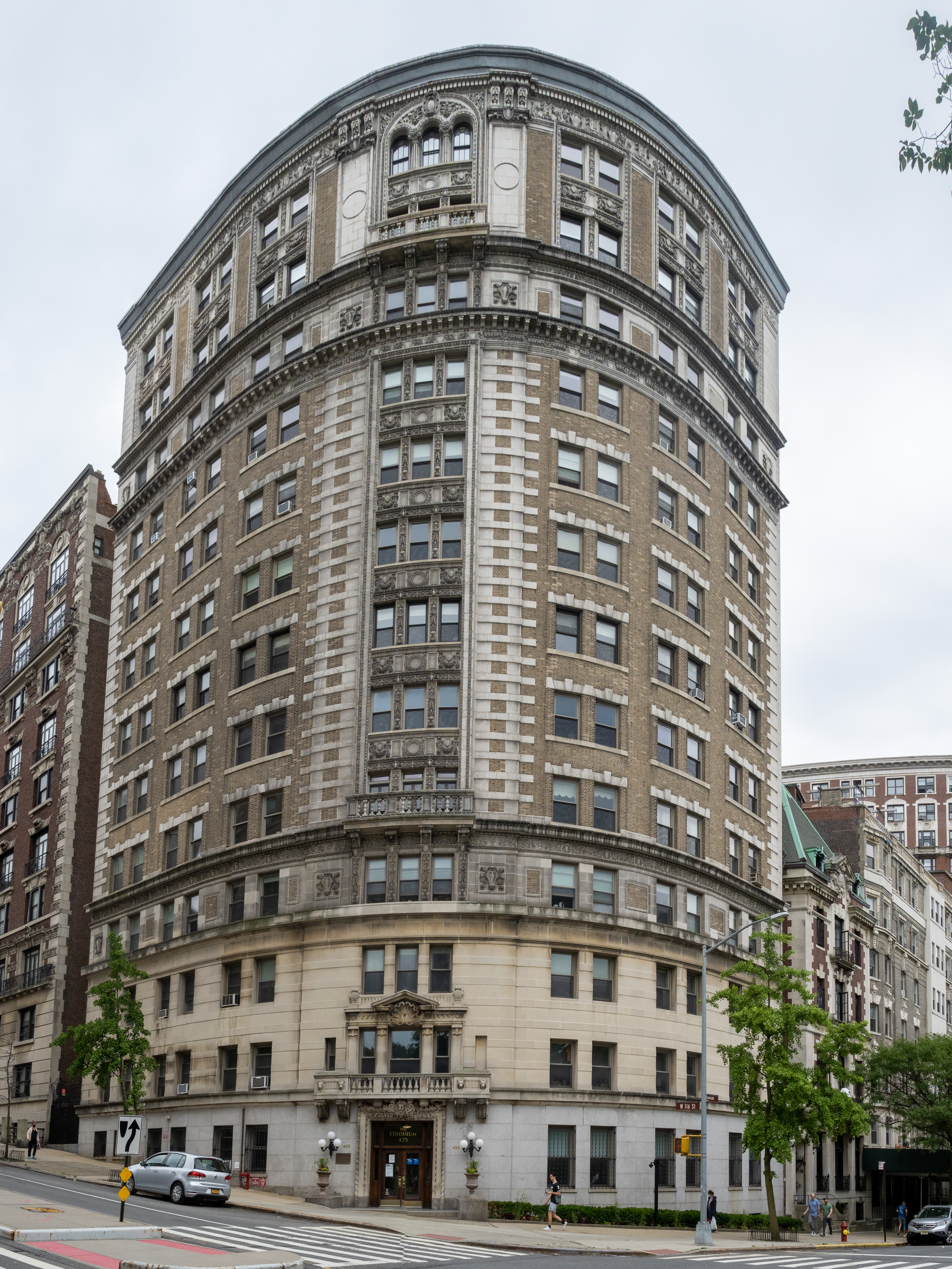

General information
- Type: Residential
- Location: 435–437 Riverside Drive, Morningside Heights, Manhattan, New York City
- Coordinates: 40°48′32″N 73°57′57″W
- Completed: 1910

Height
- Height: 132.91 ft (40.51 m)

Technical details
- Floor count: 10

Design and construction
- Architecture firm: Schwartz & Gross
- Developer: Paterno Brothers

The Colosseum is an apartment building located at 116th Street and Riverside Drive in Morningside Heights, Manhattan, New York City.

The building is noted for its curved facade, unusual among New York City buildings, and impressive marble lobby. Across 116th Street, The Colosseum faces The Paterno, another building with a similar curved facade. The New York Times has said that the "opposing curves, [form] a gateway as impressive as any publicly built arch or plaza in New York." The unusual curved facades are the result of an 1897 plan to make the land between Claremont Avenue and Riverside Drive into a public park in order to give veterans' parades a large park adjacent to Grant's Tomb as a terminus. The street was redesigned to enter the proposed park in a gracious curve, but the city never appropriated funds to buy the land.

The Colosseum was designed by Schwartz & Gross and built by the Paterno Brothers, Charles and Joseph, in 1909–1910. The luxury four-bedroom apartments with sweeping views of the Hudson River rented for $150 to $175 a month.

Harlan Fiske Stone and Lajos "Louis" Jambor lived in the Colosseum when it was a private building. The Colosseum was later acquired by Columbia University. Among the distinguished members of the Columbia faculty who have lived here are David Weiss Halivni and Edward Said.
