= Charles V. Paterno =

American real estate developer (1878–1946)

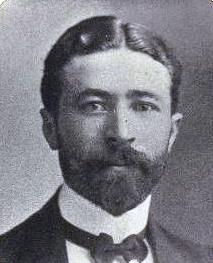
- Paterno in 1908
- Born: Canio Paternò; August 4, 1878; Castelmezzano, Basilicata, Italy
- Died: May 30, 1946 (aged 67); Westchester Country Club, Harrison, New York, U.S.
- Education: Cornell Medicine College
- Occupation: Real estate developer
- Parent(s): Giovanni Paternò; Carolina Trivigno

Charles Vincent Paterno (born Canio Paternò, August 4, 1878 – May 30, 1946) was an Italian-born American real estate developer. He was called the "Napoleon of the Manhattan Skyscraper Builders".

== Life and career ==
Paterno was born in Castelmezzano, in the Italian region of Basilicata, to Giovanni Paternò, a real estate businessman, and Carolina Trivigno. Paterno emigrated to the United States due to financial problems caused by an earthquake which destroyed a construction project that his father was involved with. He graduated from Cornell Medical School in 1899, with the intention of becoming a doctor of medicine, but never practiced. After his father's death, Paterno and his brother Joseph took over the family real estate business. By 1918, the Paternos owned 75 buildings housing about 28,000 people.

The Paterno family developed a number of apartment buildings on the Upper East Side, in Morningside Heights, and Washington Heights neighborhoods of Manhattan in New York City, including:

- The Colosseum (1909–1910)
- The Paterno (1909–1910)
- Hudson View Gardens (1923–25)
- 825 Fifth Avenue (1926–1927)
- Castle Village (1938–1939)

Paterno died at the Westchester Country Club in Harrison, New York, on May 30, 1946. He is memorialized by the Paterno Trivium at the intersection of Cabrini Boulevard, West 187th Street, and Pinehurst Avenue in the Hudson Heights subsection of Washington Heights.

== Paterno Castle ==
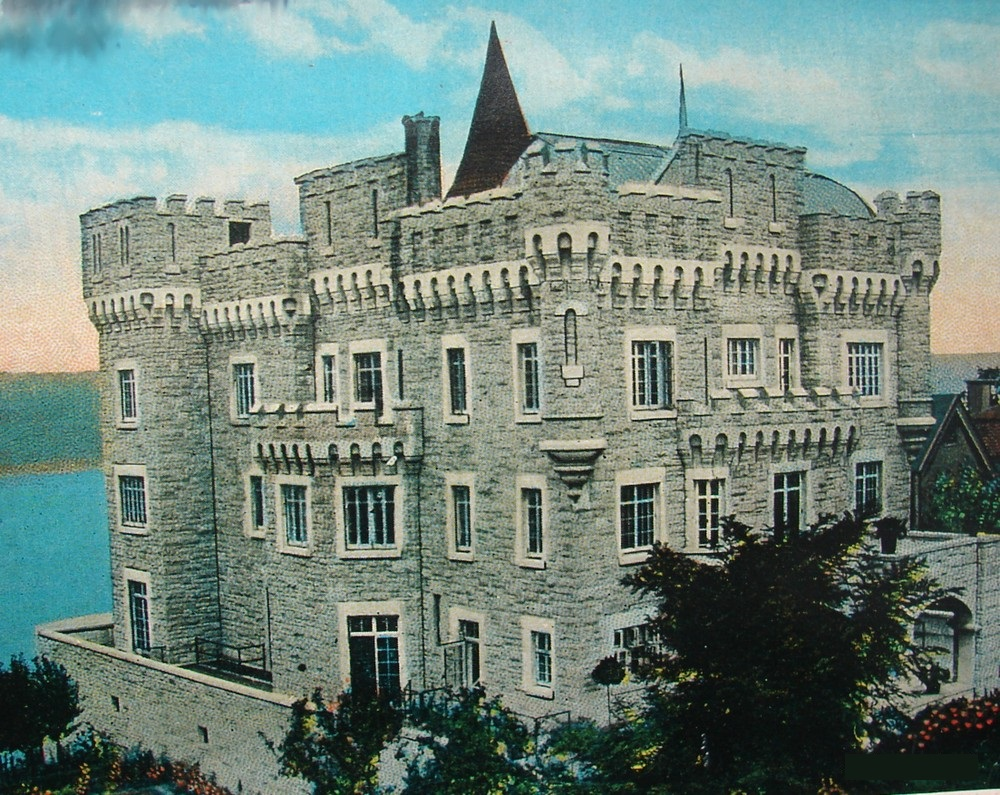
Hand-colored postcard of the Paterno Castle, ca. 1920)

The Paterno Castle, was an early 20th century Neo-Gothic four-story 35-room castle shaped mansion located in New York City, where Charles Paterno lived, in what is now an apartment complex.

The completed castle survived barely two decades. Paterno later moved from the castle to Greenwich, Connecticut, and in 1938 he decided to demolish the castle and most of the surrounding estate to erect the "Castle Village" complex of co-operative apartments. The area was becoming increasingly residential, and The New York Times quoted Paterno as saying that "the many improvements in that part of the city ... had led to a strong residential movement in that area with a definite demand for the finer type of garden type apartments."

Some remnants of the estate can still be seen.

== Gallery ==
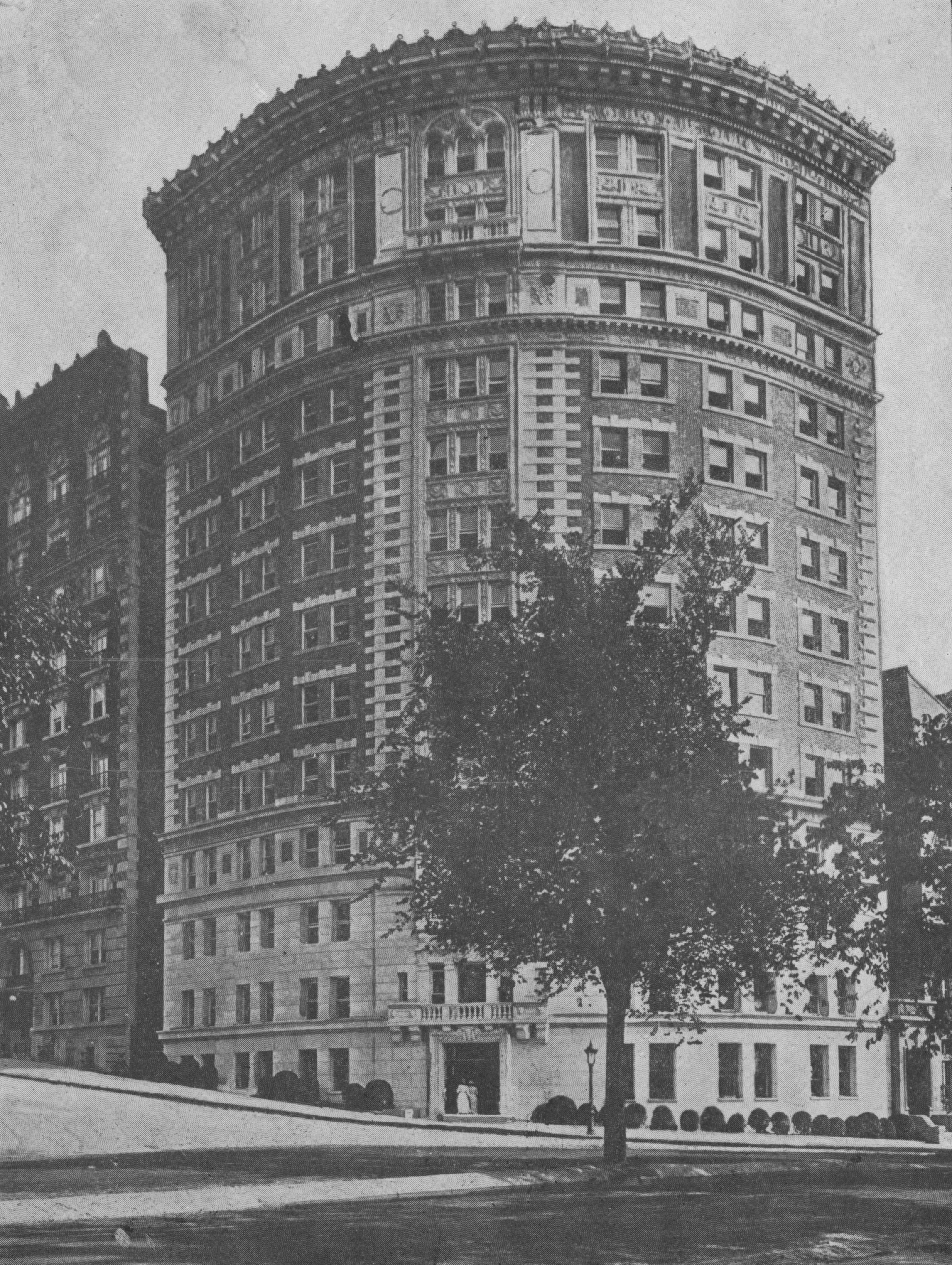
The Colosseum apartment building in 1910

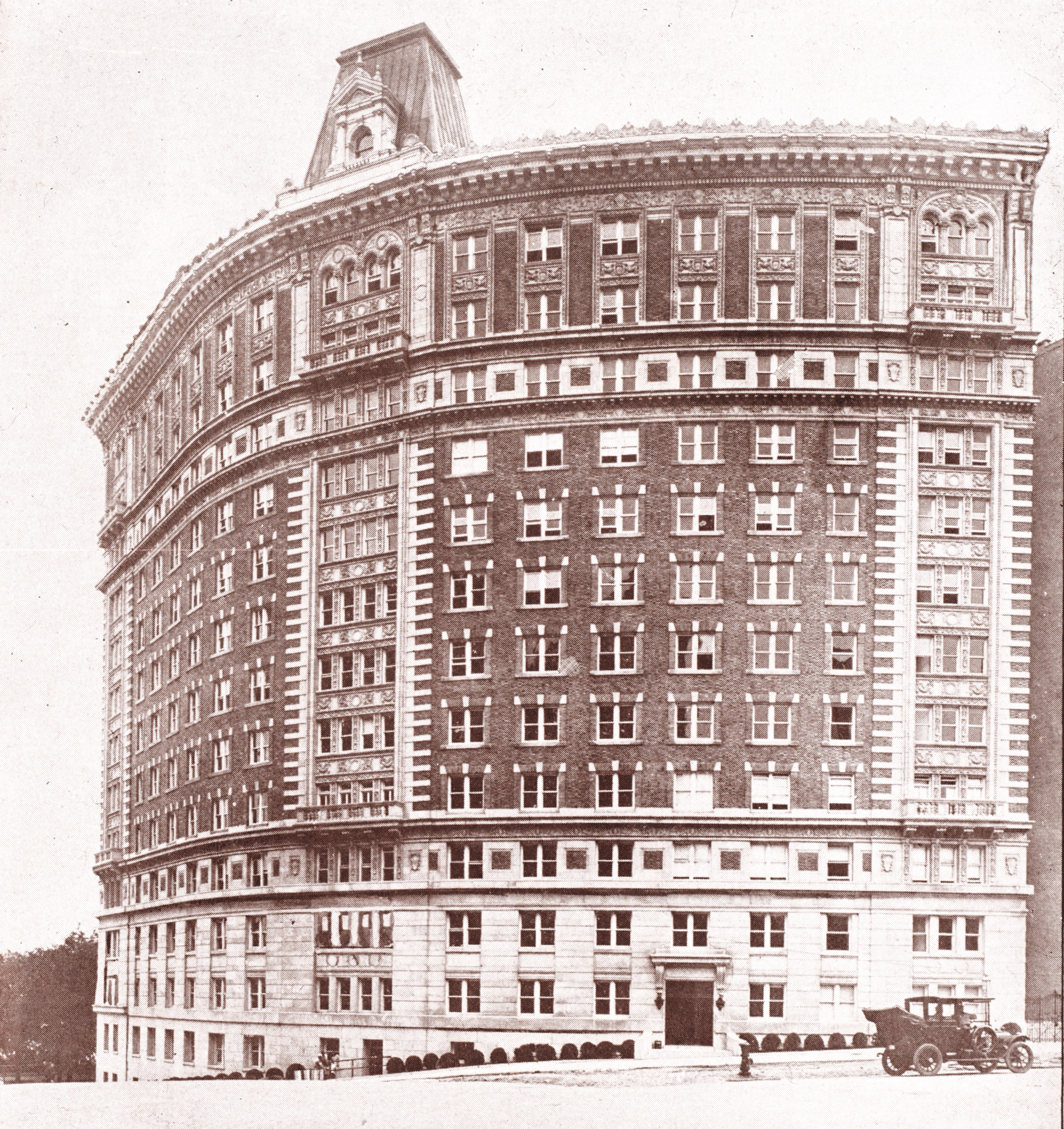
The Paterno in 1910

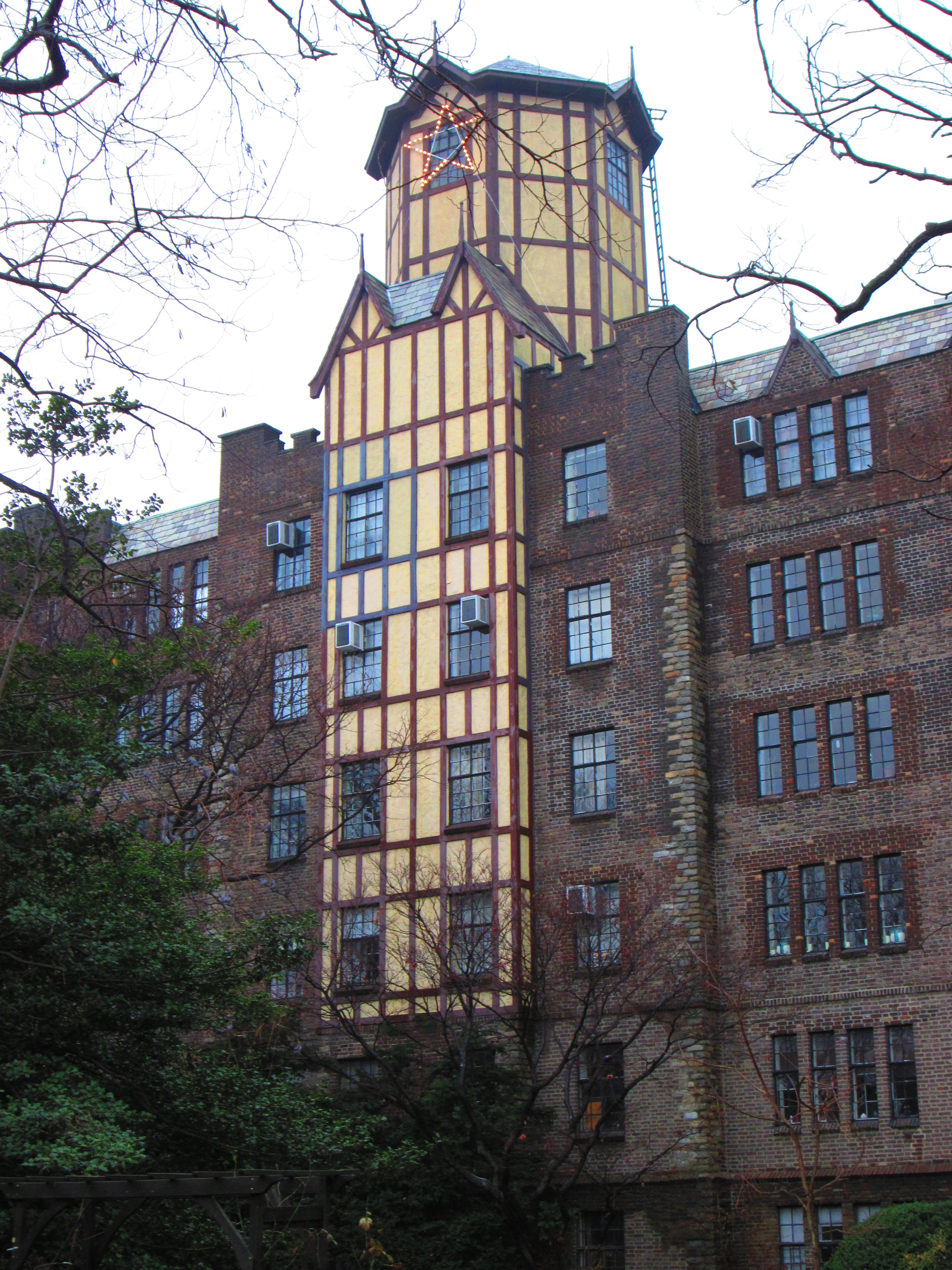
Hudson View Gardens as seen from Bennett Park

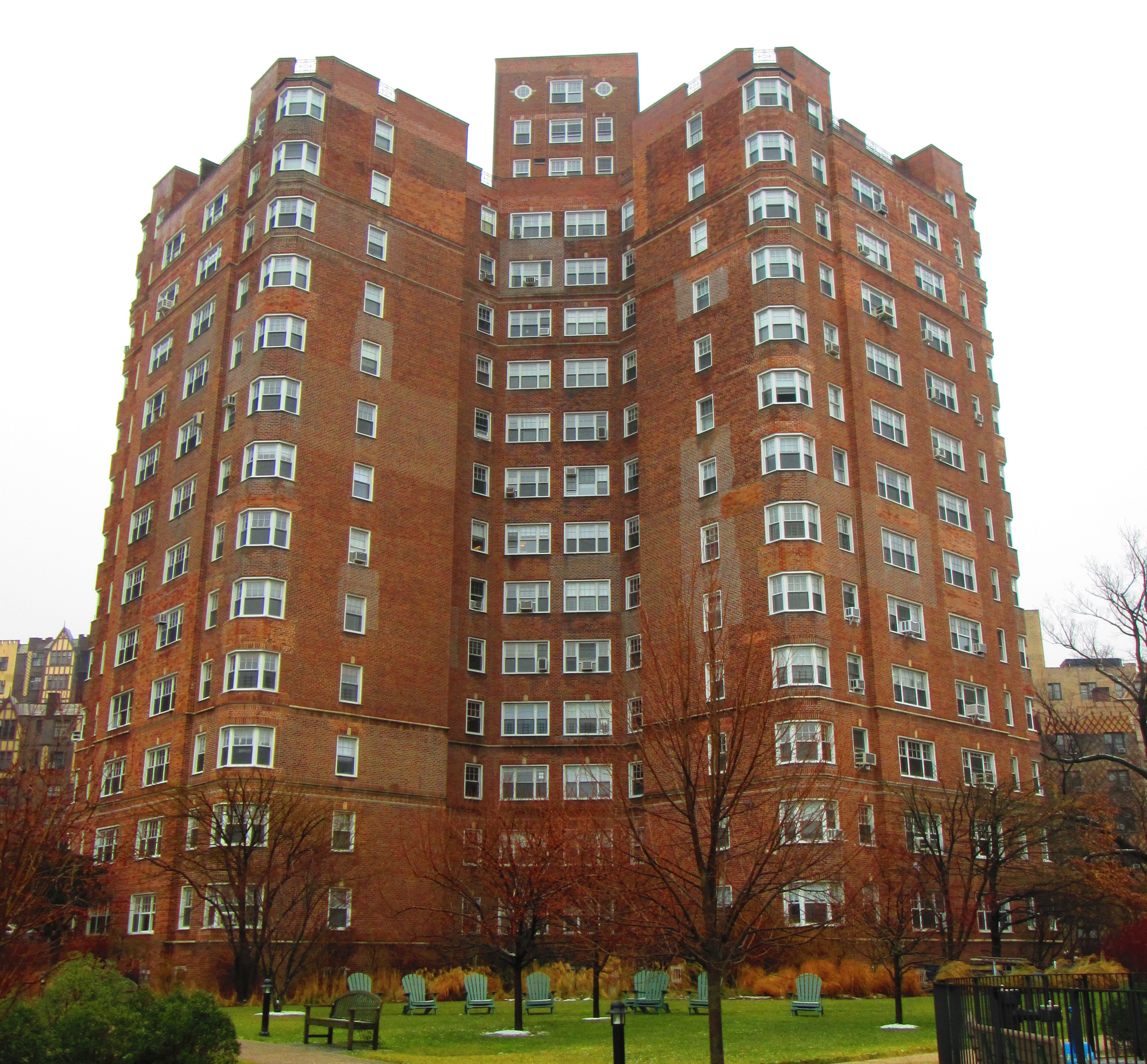
A building of the Castle Village complex

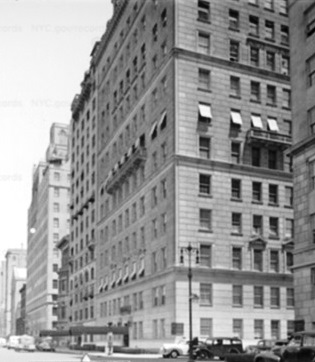
825 Fifth Avenue, c. 1939–1941

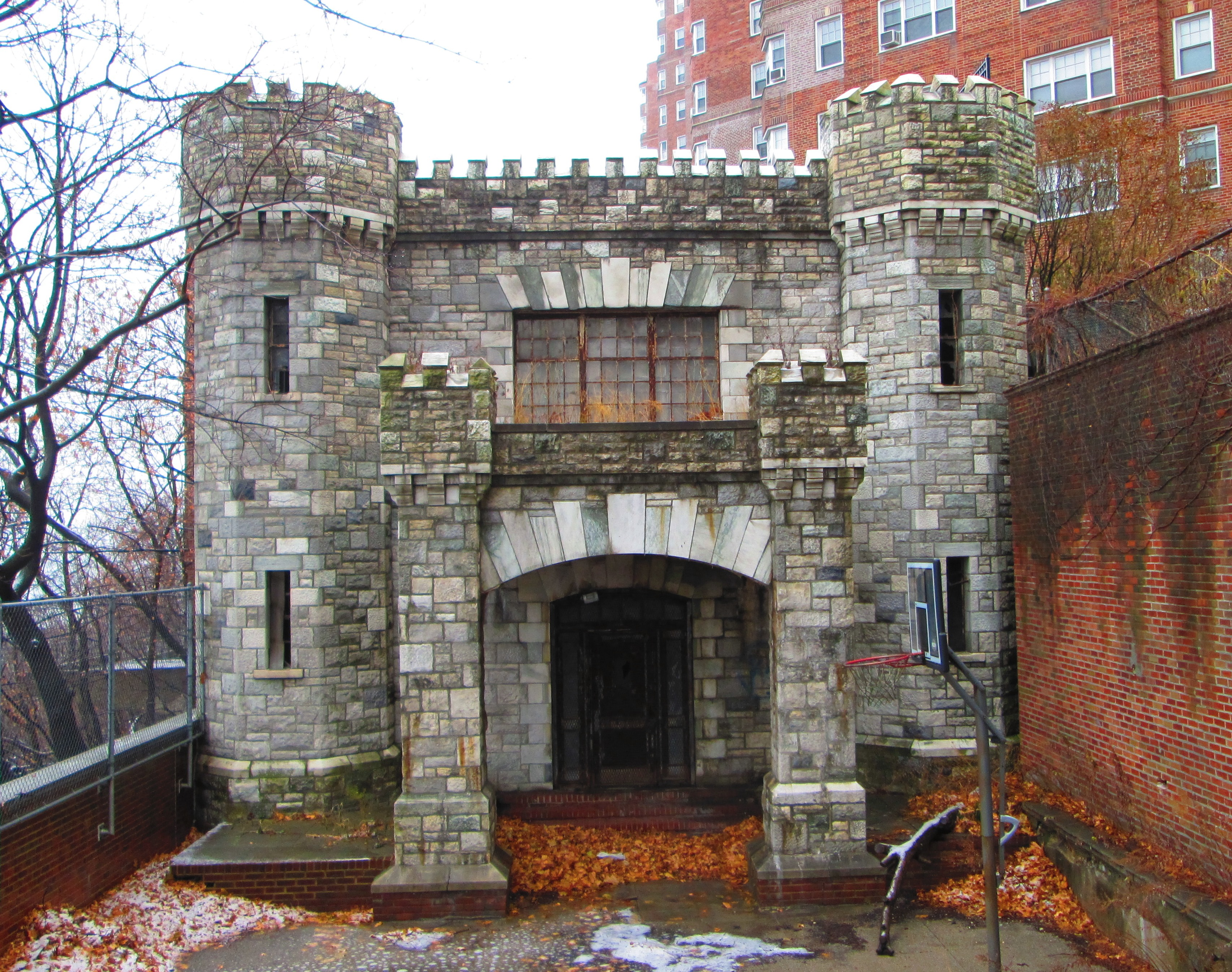
A remnant of the Paterno estate, now a utility building for Castle Village

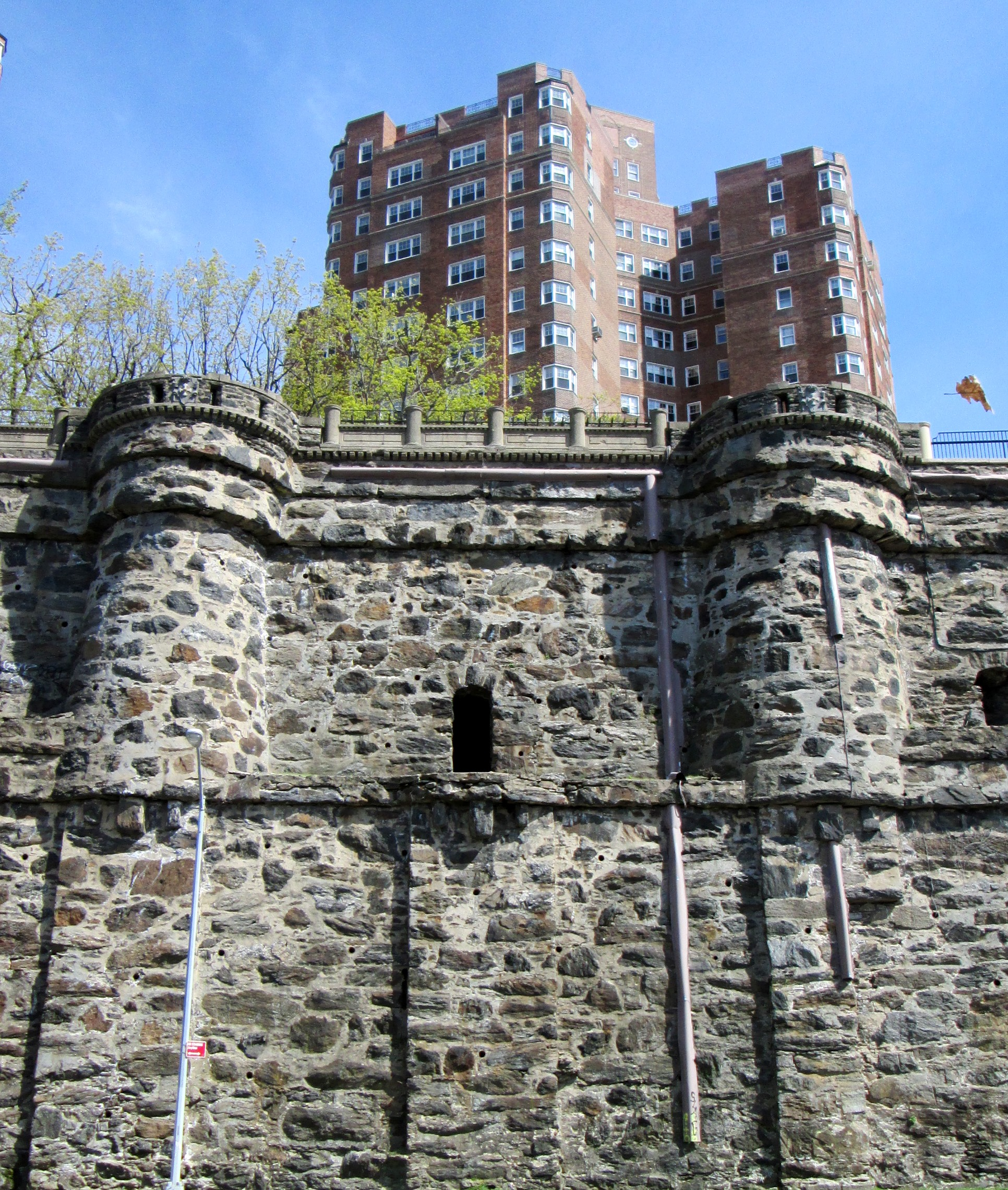
The retaining wall from the estate is still used for Castle Village, seen behind it.

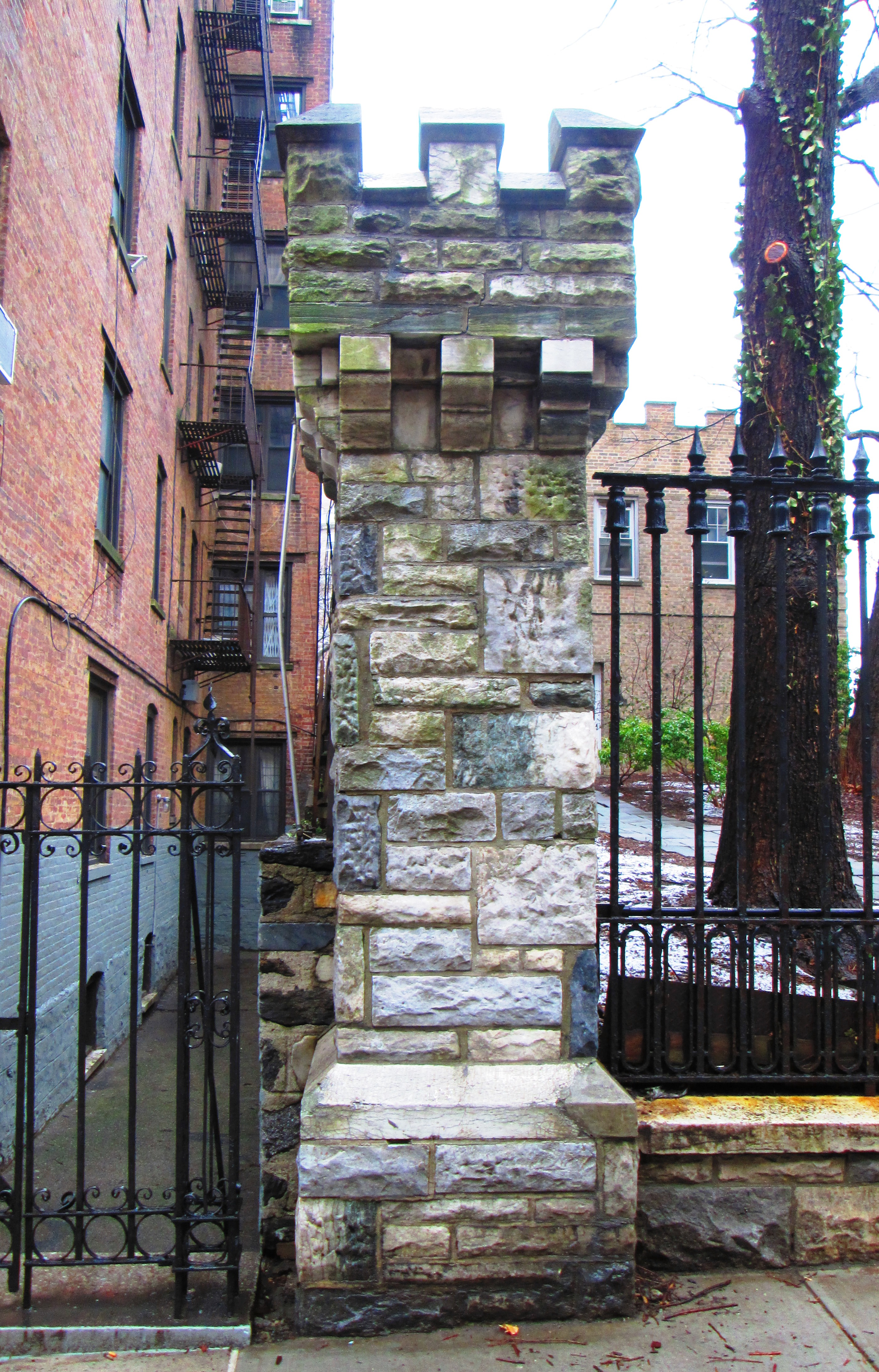
A stone pillar remnant from the estate

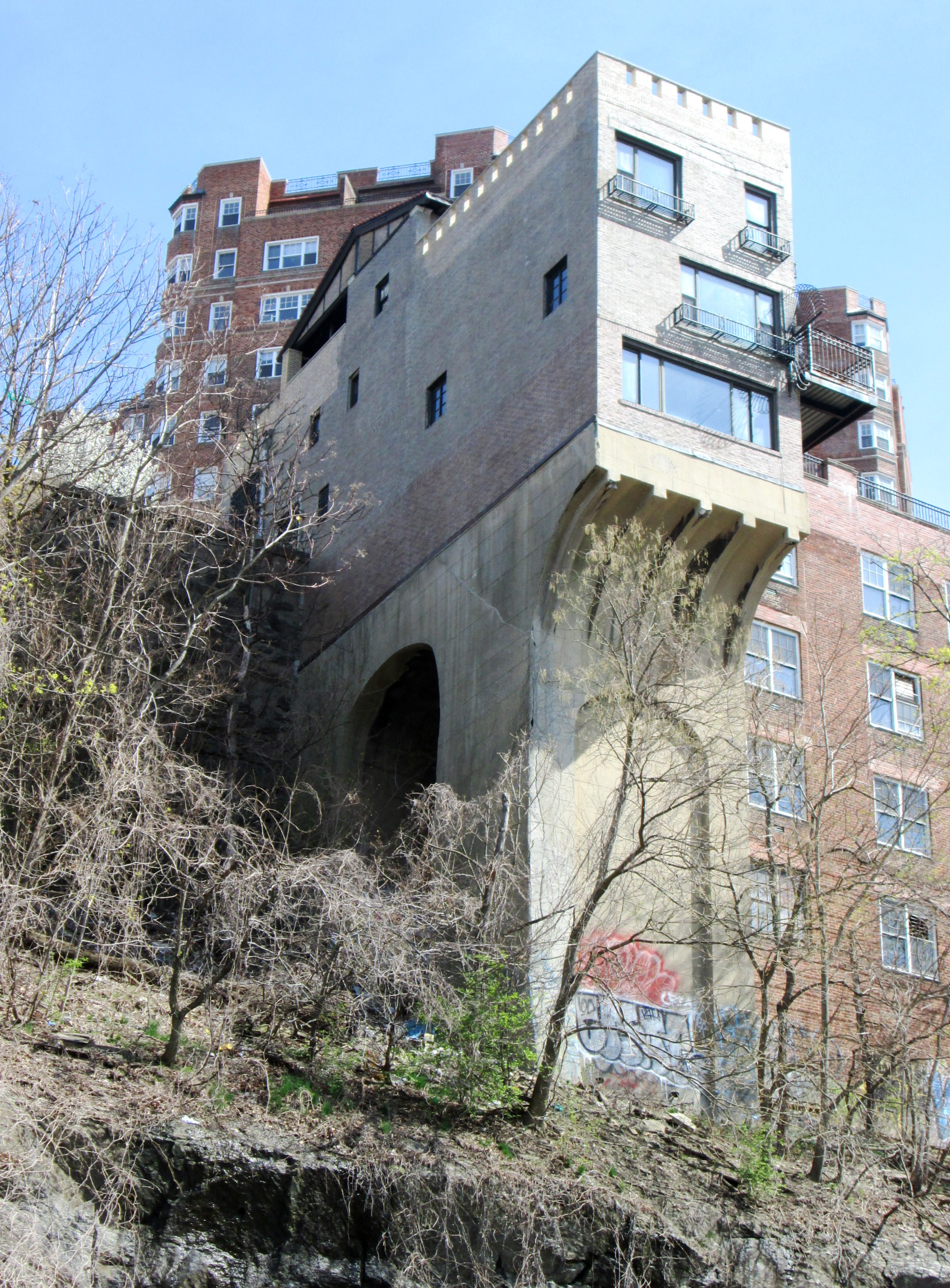
The "Pumpkin House", the former guest house of the Paterno estate as seen from the Hudson River Greenway
