= 116th Street (Manhattan) =

West-east street in Manhattan, New York

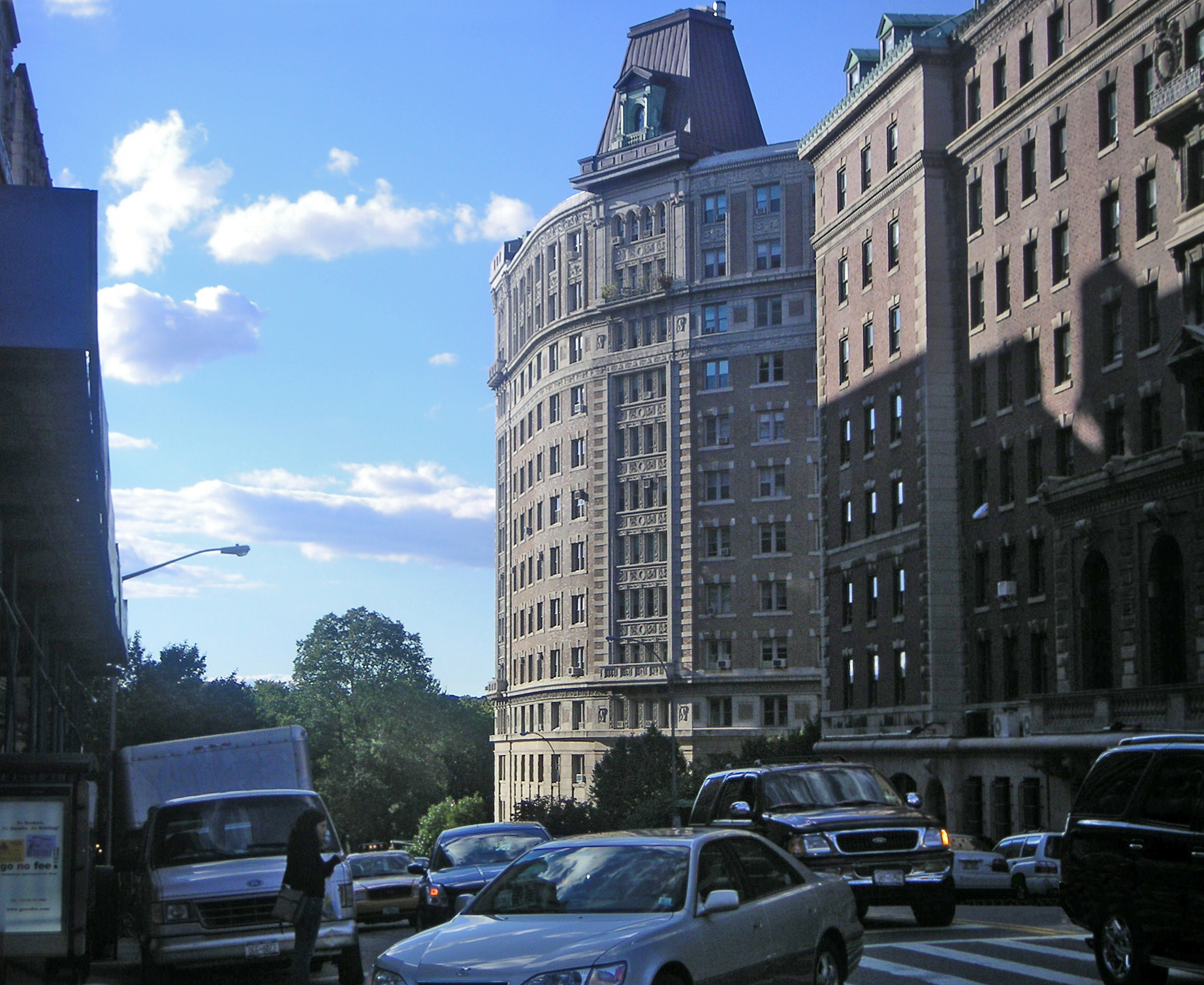
- West 116th Street at Broadway looking toward The Paterno apartment building on Riverside Drive
- Interactive map of 116th Street
- Length: 1.73 mi (2.78 km)
- Location: Manhattan
- Coordinates: 40.8014°N 73.9481°W
- West end: Riverside Drive
- Major junctions: Broadway at Columbia University
- East end: FDR Drive

116th Street runs from Riverside Drive, overlooking the Hudson River, to the East River, through the New York City borough of Manhattan. It traverses the neighborhoods of Morningside Heights, Harlem, and Spanish Harlem; the street is interrupted between Morningside Heights and Harlem by Morningside Park.

== History ==
The street was designated by the Commissioners' Plan of 1811 that established the Manhattan street grid as one of 15 east-west streets that would be 100 feet (30 m) in width (while other streets were designated as 60 feet (18 m) in width).

== Description ==
=== West Side ===
The western entrance to 116th Street at Riverside Drive is flanked by a pair of white apartment buildings with curved facades, The Colosseum and The Paterno.

The New York Times has said that the "opposing curves, (form) a gateway as impressive as any publicly built arch or plaza in New York. The unusual curves of the buildings are the result of an 1897 street plan to make the land between Claremont Avenue and Riverside Drive an extension of the adjacent Riverside Park. Parades coming up Riverside Drive would be able to curve gracefully onto Claremont Avenue on the way to Grant's Tomb. The city chose not to buy the land, and it was sold for development. The street plan curves at 116th Street, however, remained. The top of The Paterno is capped with an architectural fancy masking a water tower in a shape that conjures up a section of Mansard roof, complete with dormer window. It is visible from the gates of Columbia University at Broadway and 116th Street.

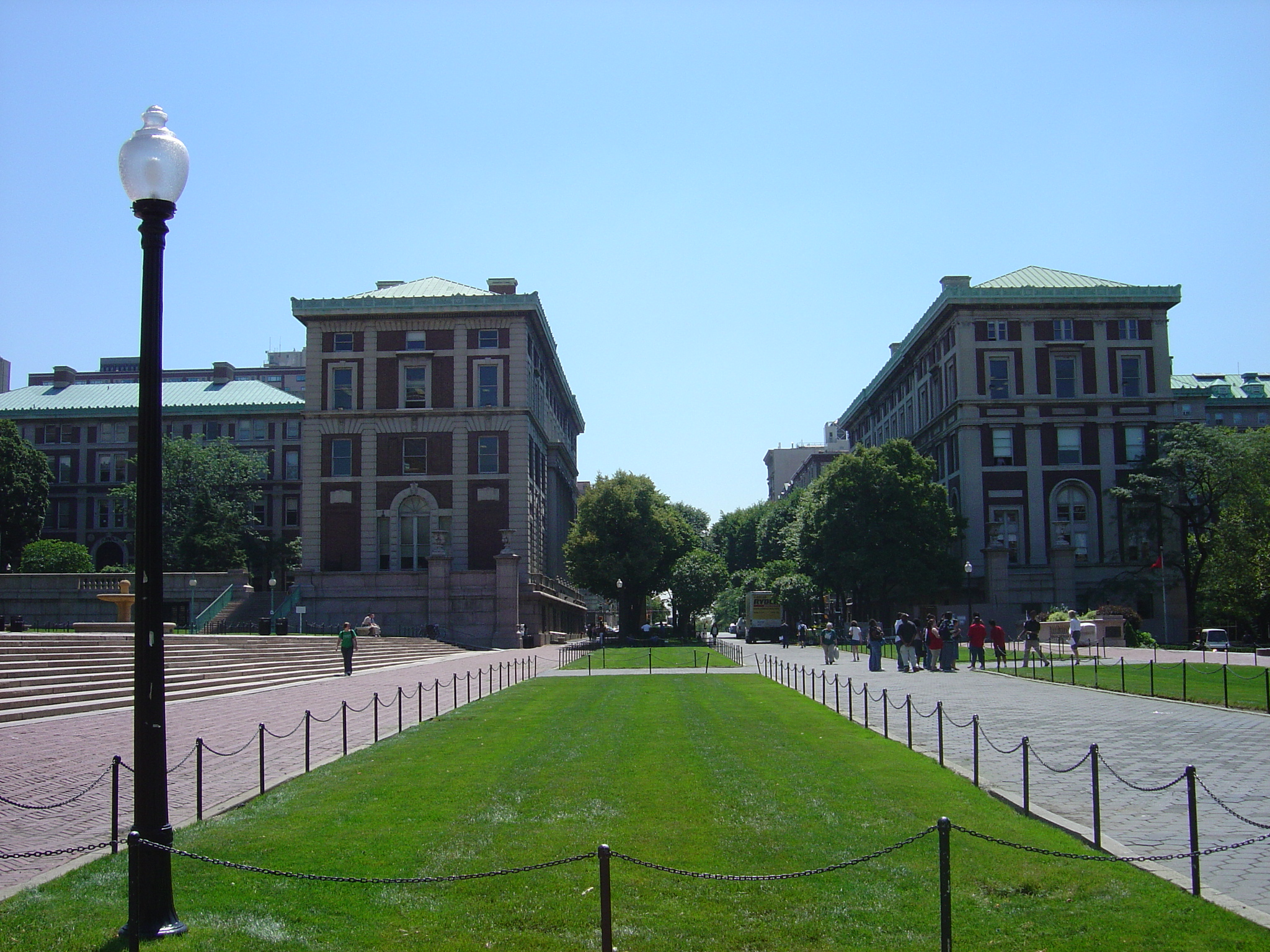
College Walk, formerly part of 116th Street

The intersection of 116th Street and Broadway is the location of the main entrance of Columbia University, the city's Ivy League college. Until the 1950s, the street ran uninterrupted through Morningside Heights from Riverside Drive to Morningside Park. In 1953, during Dwight D. Eisenhower's presidency at Columbia, however, the block between Broadway and Amsterdam Avenue was permanently closed to vehicular traffic and was turned into a pedestrian way called "College Walk." The street had been ceded to Columbia in exchange for a payment of $1,000. The pedestrian walkway was open to the public until October 2023, when the University closed both entrances in anticipation of demonstrations over the war in Gaza. In 2026, the City of New York joined the local Morningside Heights community requesting the historically public walk be reopened to allow access to neighborhood destinations on either side of the large campus.

116th Street continues from Columbia University for one block before ending at Morningside Drive and the Carl Schurz Monument, overlooking Morningside Park. The 116th Street entrance to the park opens to stairs that descend a steep incline into the wooded area that includes walking paths, playgrounds and ball fields. A security booth was installed at the entrance in 2006.

=== East Side ===
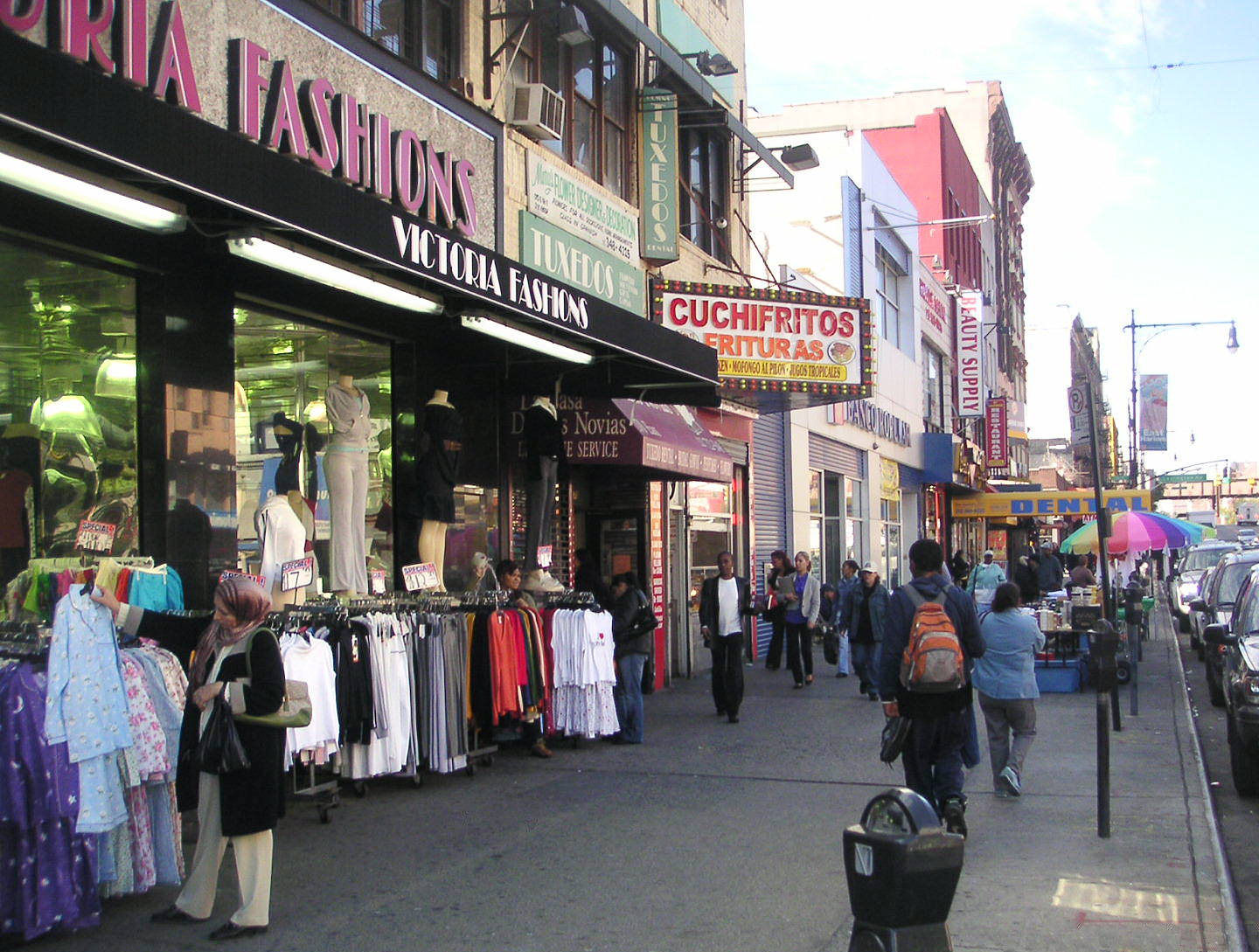
116th Street in East Harlem, 2007

The main, east-west thoroughfare portion of 116th Street begins at the eastern edge of Morningside Park and runs east through central Harlem. A large West African immigrant community has developed in central Harlem with stores, bakeries and cafés along 116th Street west of St. Nicholas Avenue. This community has been called Little Senegal or Le Petit Senegal.

At Lenox Ave., the street runs past the Malcolm Shabazz Mosque, formerly the Mosque No. 7. The building was erected as the Lenox Casino.

East of Fifth Avenue, 116th Street has historically been the primary business hub of Spanish Harlem. From Lexington Avenue to First Avenue, the street is lined with businesses selling food, clothing, and other specialty and ethnically specific goods to a Spanish-speaking clientele. East 116th Street terminates at FDR Drive, the site of the East River Plaza, a retail mall complex with large commercial tenants Costco, Aldi and Target.

== Transportation ==
Subway stations on 116th Street are, from west to east:

- 116th Street–Columbia University serving the 1 train at Broadway
- 116th Street serving the B and C trains at Frederick Douglass Boulevard
- 116th Street serving the 2 and 3 trains at Lenox Avenue
- 116th Street serving the 6 and <6> trains at Lexington Avenue

The future 116th Street will serve the N, Q, and R trains at Second Avenue when constructed.

There is no bus service west of Manhattan Avenue. The M116 New York City Bus route is the primary server, running to First Avenue (eastbound) or from Pleasant Avenue (westbound). From Lenox Avenue, the M7 heads west to Manhattan Avenue and the M102 east to Lexington Avenue (eastbound) or from Third Avenue (westbound).

In 2026, work began on a bus lane corridor along 116th Street.

== In popular culture ==
116th Street in Harlem is the background for the book The Street (1946) by Ann Petry. The story is about Lutie Johnson, a single young black mother, who moves to 116th Street to give her son better opportunities.

116th Street and Broadway is the opening scene of The Caine Mutiny (1951) by Herman Wouk as Willie Keith is being dropped off by his mother to join the Navy in World War II.

== Gallery ==
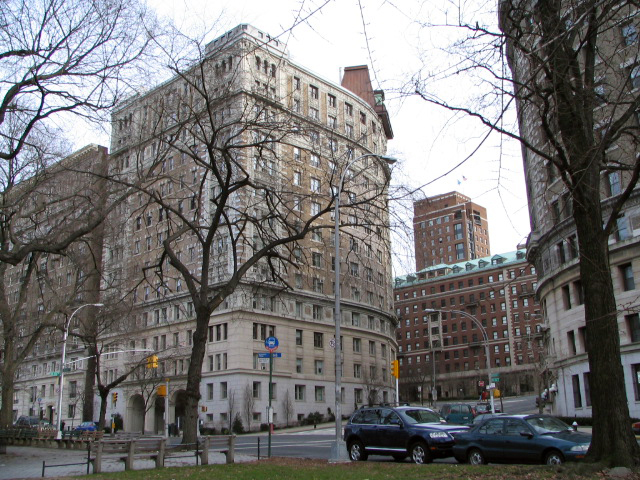
Termination of 116th Street at Riverside Drive

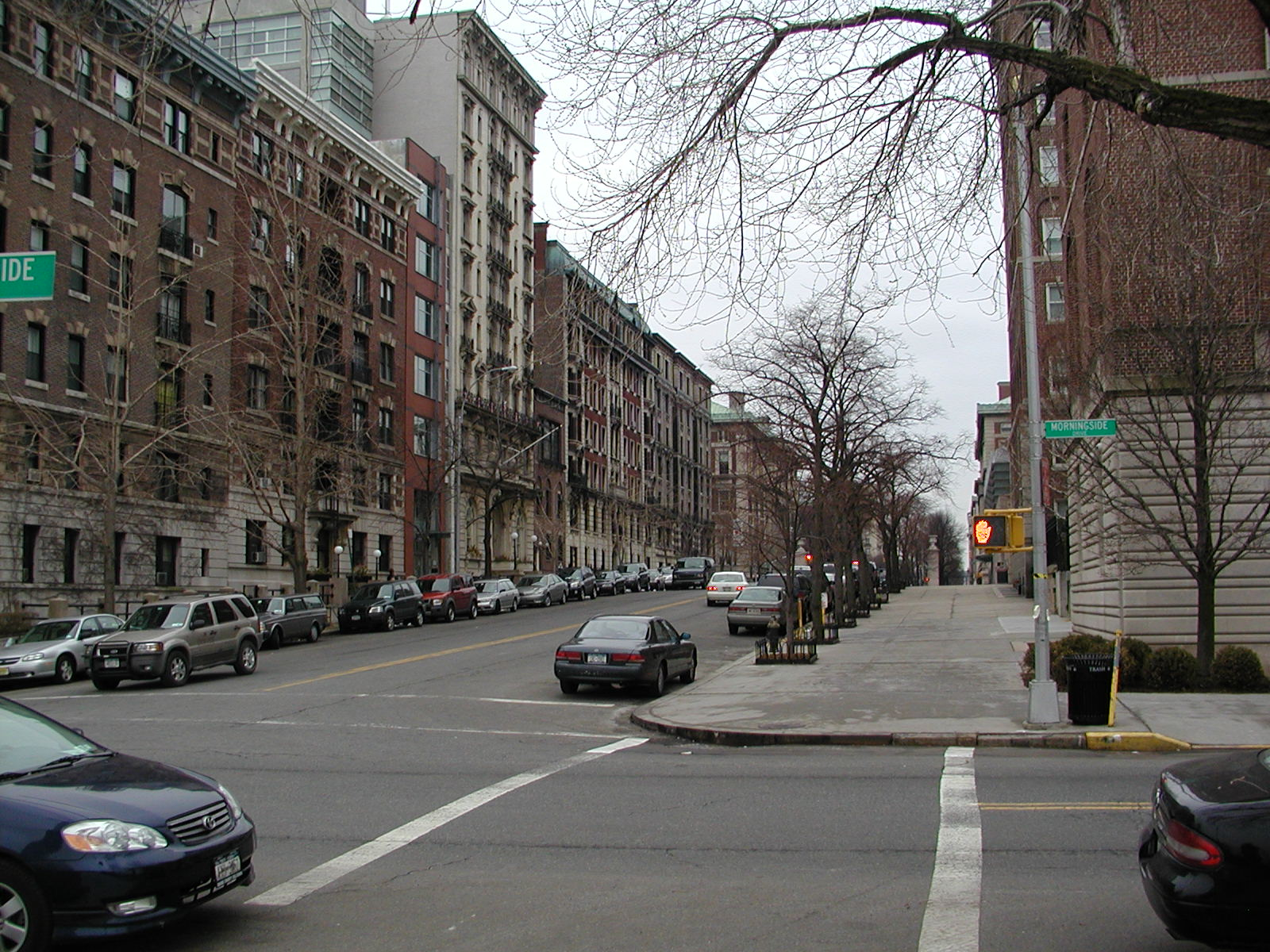
Looking west from Morningside Drive; Morningside Park is behind the camera.

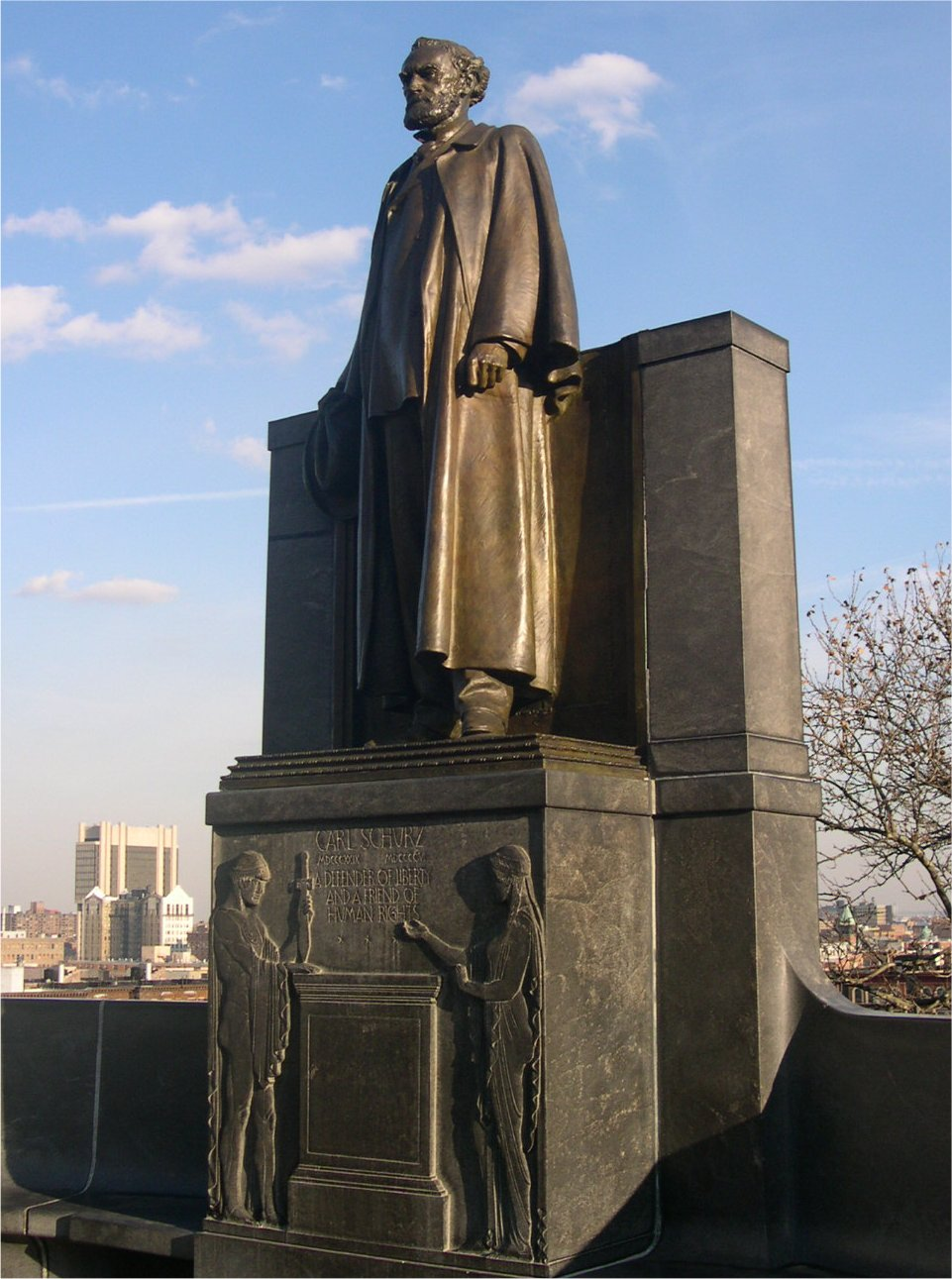
Carl Schurz statue at the 116th Street overlook at Morningside Park.

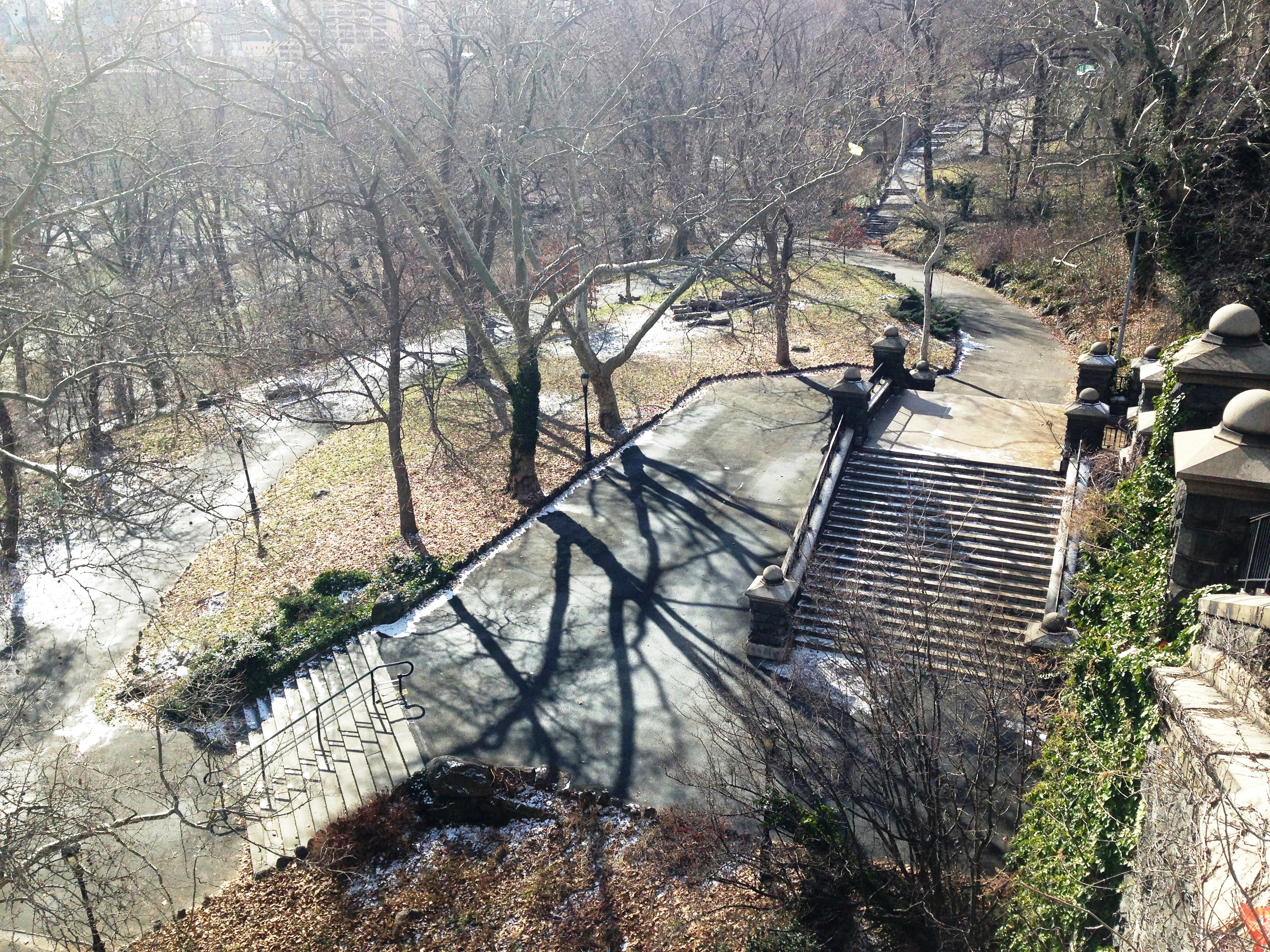
Steps into Morningside Park at the 116th Street entrance.

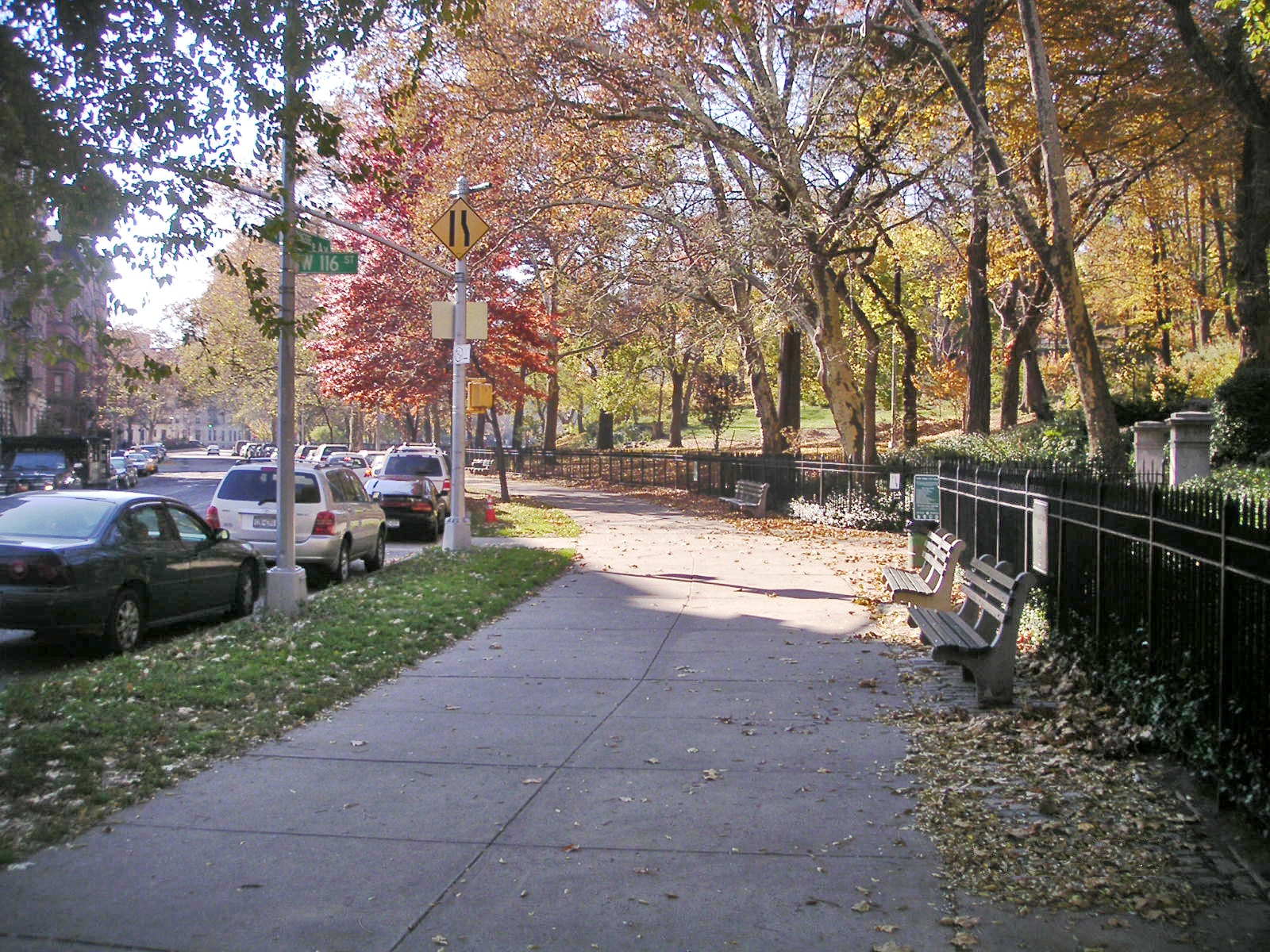
Morningside Avenue, east side of the park. 115th Street buildings in background.

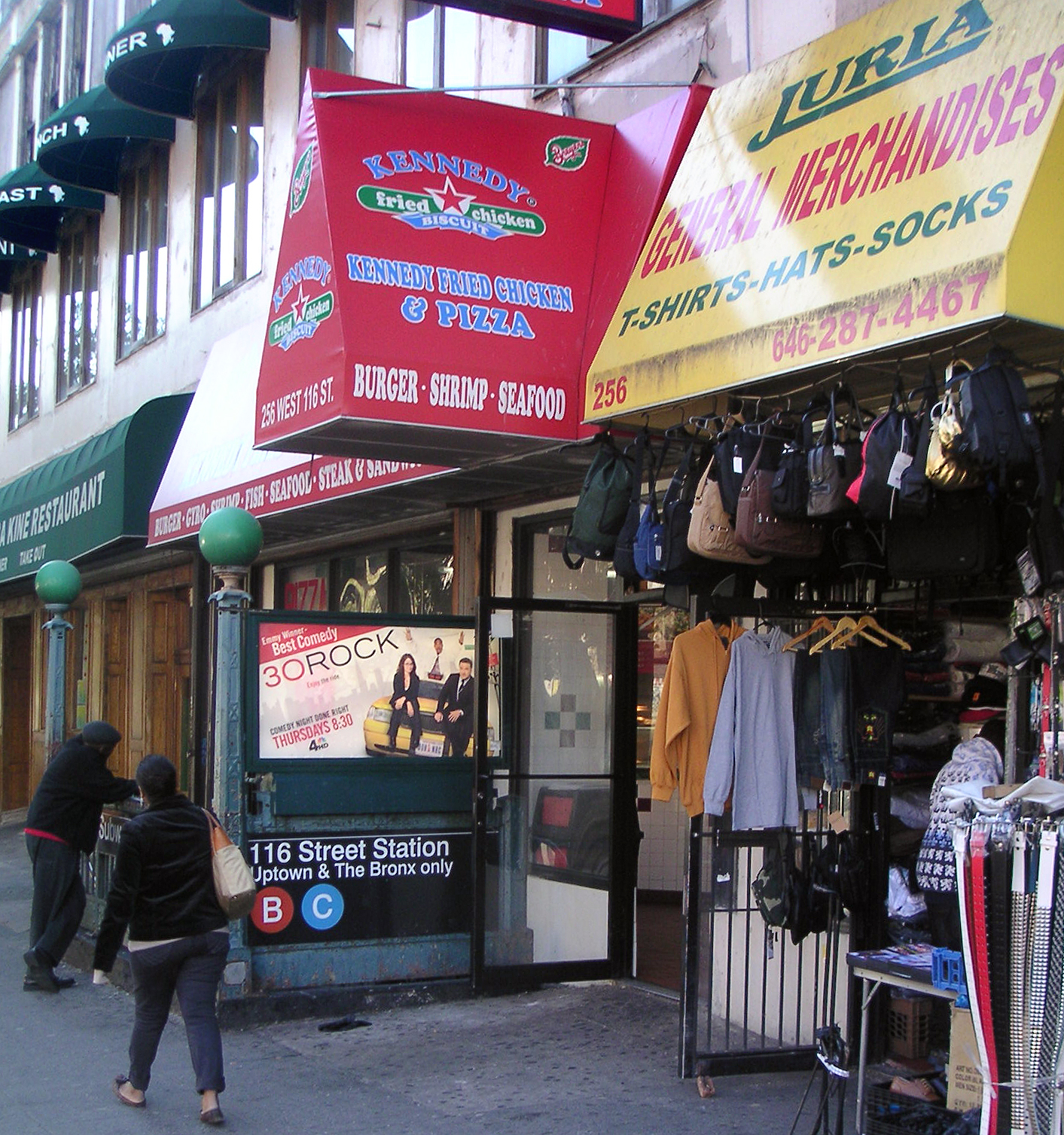
116th Street at Eighth Avenue in Harlem, and the uptown entrance to 116th Street station (A, B, and C trains).

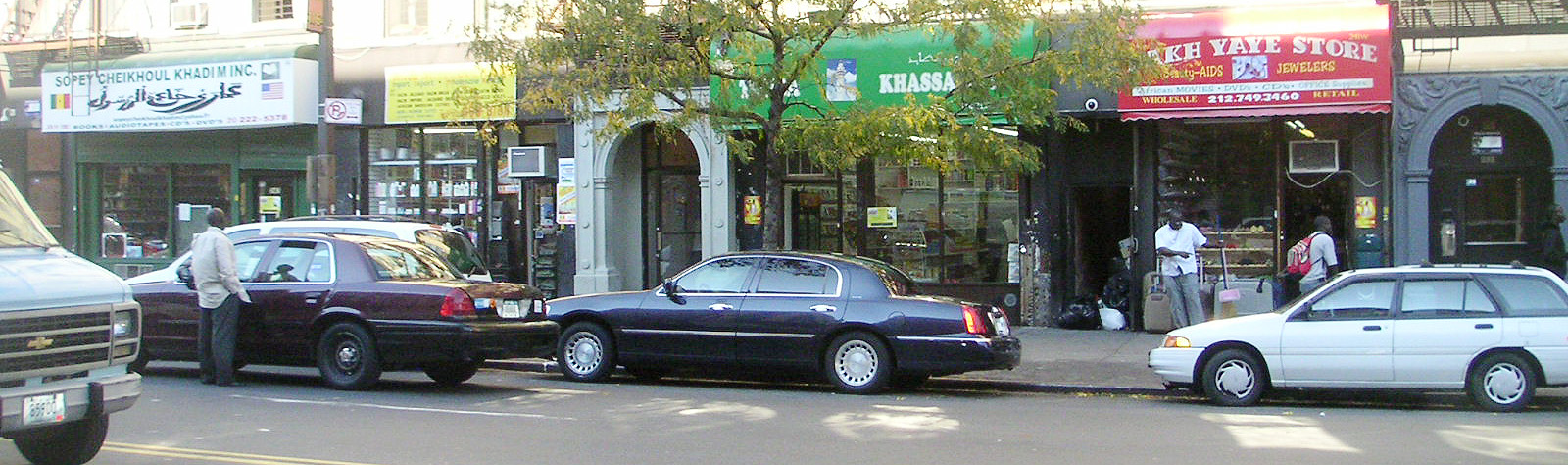
West African stores between Adam Clayton Powell Jr. Boulevard and Eighth Avenue in Harlem, 2007.

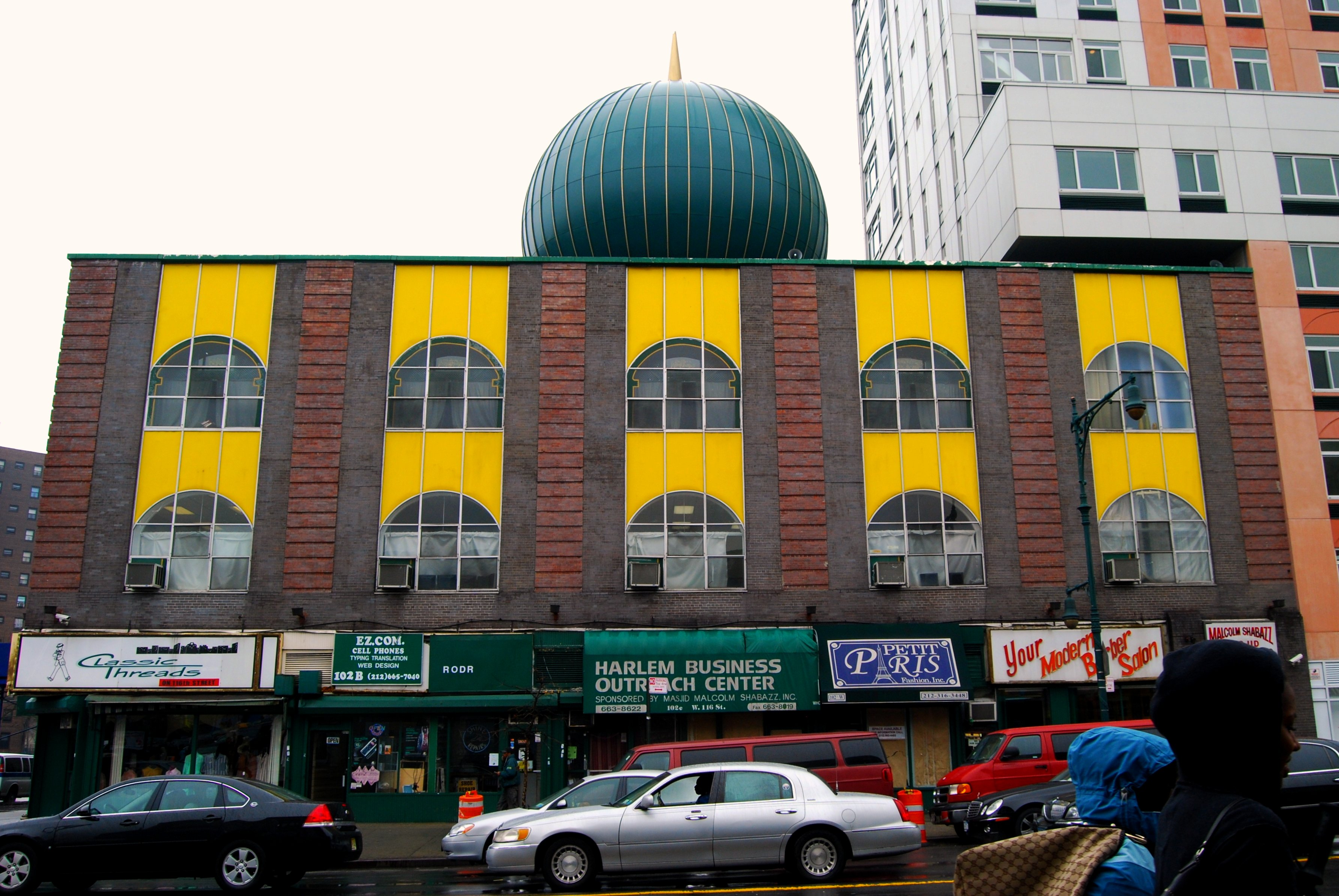
Malcolm Shabazz Mosque, 116th and Lenox Avenue.

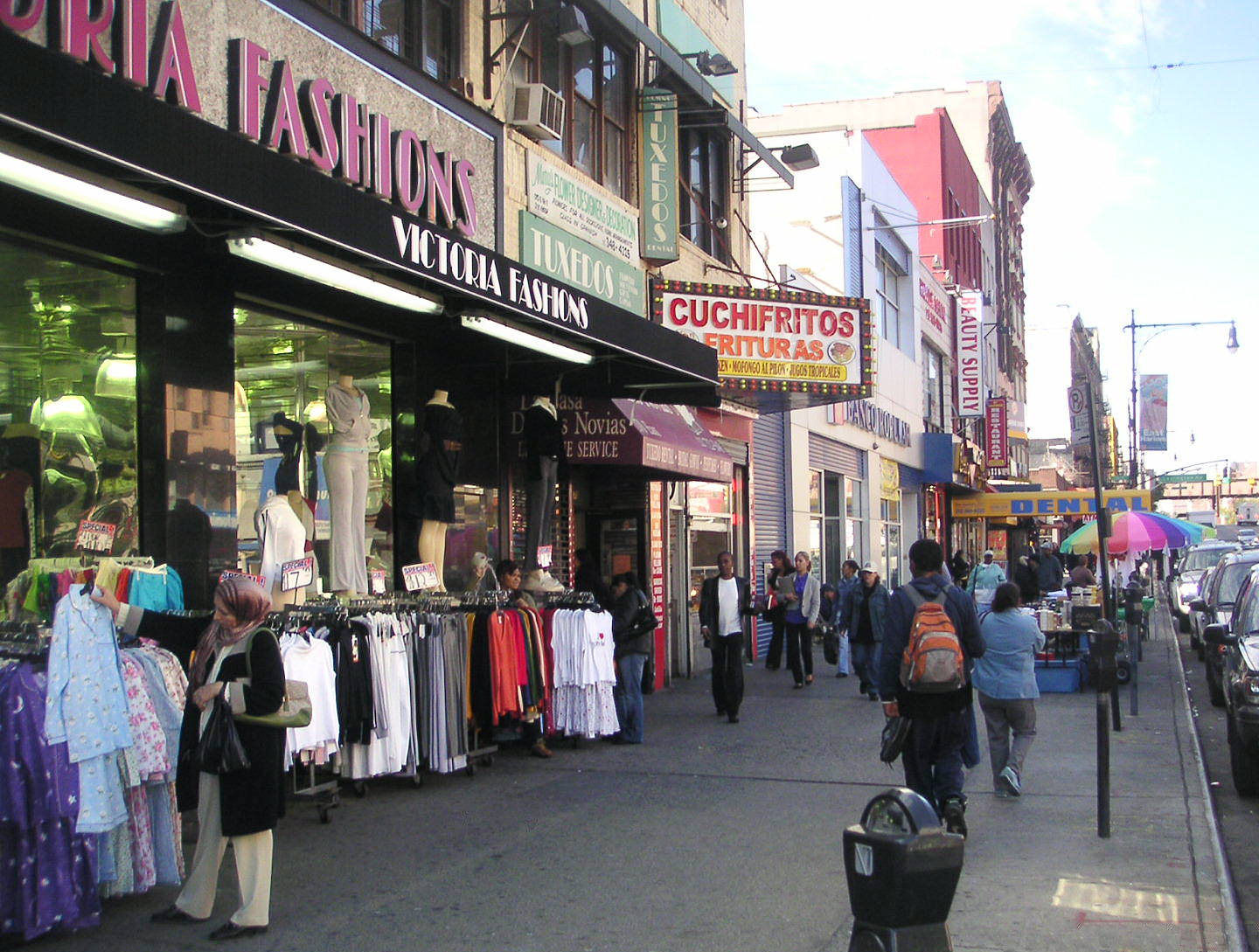
El Barrio, 116th Street between Third Avenue and Lexington Avenue, 2007.

== See also ==
- 116th Street Crew, a Mafia crew with the Genovese crime family
- Ciro Terranova, the "Artichoke King" moved to 138 East 116th Street after declaring bankruptcy and foreclosing on his home
- Morello crime family, the Morellos owned the building at 338 East 116th Street, the headquarters of the Aignatz Aflorio Co-operative association
