= The Caine Mutiny Court-Martial (2023 film) =

American film by William Friedkin

- Promotional release poster
- Genre: Legal drama
- Based on: The Caine Mutiny Court-Martial by Herman Wouk The Caine Mutiny by Herman Wouk
- Teleplay by: William Friedkin
- Directed by: William Friedkin
- Starring: Kiefer Sutherland; Jason Clarke; Jake Lacy; Monica Raymund; Lance Reddick
- Country of origin: United States
- Original language: English

Production
- Executive producers: Michael Salven; Mike Upton
- Producers: Annabelle Dunne; Matthew Parker
- Cinematography: Michael Grady
- Editor: Darrin Navarro
- Running time: 109 minutes
- Production companies: Showtime Networks; Selsed House; Loveless Media

Original release
- Network: Venice
- Release: September 3, 2023
- Network: Paramount+ with Showtime
- Release: October 6, 2023

The Caine Mutiny Court-Martial is a 2023 American legal drama film written and directed by William Friedkin. It is based on Herman Wouk's 1953 play of the same name, itself based on Wouk's 1951 novel The Caine Mutiny. It stars Kiefer Sutherland, Jason Clarke, Jake Lacy, Monica Raymund, and Lance Reddick. The film marks a posthumous release for Reddick and Friedkin, who both died in 2023 on March 17 and August 7, respectively, and is Friedkin's final work.

The film premiered at the 80th Venice International Film Festival on September 3, 2023, and was released in the United States on Paramount+ with Showtime by Republic Pictures on October 6, 2023.

== Synopsis ==
When U.S. Navy Commander Queeg shows potential signs of mental instability that jeopardizes the safety of his ship, USS Caine, in a violent storm, the executive officer, Lt. Maryk, relieves him of command; Maryk now faces court-martial for mutiny. Lt. Greenwald, a skeptical JAG lawyer, is made to defend Maryk. During the cross-examination the personality and actions of Queeg raise the question of who should be court-martialled.

== Cast ==
- Kiefer Sutherland as Lieutenant Commander Queeg, commanding officer of USS Caine.
- Jason Clarke as Lieutenant Greenwald, defense attorney
- Jake Lacy as Lieutenant Maryk
- Monica Raymund as Lieutenant Commander Challee, lead prosecutor
- Lewis Pullman as Lieutenant Keefer
- Jay Duplass as Lieutenant Alan Bird
- Tom Riley as Lieutenant Keith
- Lance Reddick as Captain Blakely, head judge
- Elizabeth Anweis as Lieutenant Commander Joan Lundeen, MD, Navy psychiatrist
- Francois Battiste as Captain Southard
- Gabe Kessler as Petty Officer Third Class Urban
- Gina Garcia-Sharp as the stenographer
- Stephanie Erb as Rear Admiral Lucille Stutz
- Dale Dye as Vice Admiral R. T. Dewey
- Denzel Johnson as Prosecution Paralegal J. P. Simmons

== Production ==
The Caine Mutiny Court-Martial is a film that I have long awaited to make, originally written by one of the masters of his time, Herman Wouk. I knew that I wanted to create a highly tense, pressurized scenario which would move rapidly along like a bat out of hell. I intentionally chose to keep the issue of right and wrong as ambiguous as possible. I was consistently impressed with the level of expertise that our actors brought to their roles and I believe that these are some of the best performances I have ever seen.

— William Friedkin, speaking about the film

In September 2021, William Friedkin announced plans to develop an adaptation of The Caine Mutiny Court-Martial and that he was beginning the process of casting the film. The following year, in August, Deadline Hollywood officially reported that a new adaptation of Herman Wouk's novel The Caine Mutiny directed by Friedkin was in the works for Paramount Global Content Distribution and Showtime Networks. Kiefer Sutherland was announced to star, with Friedkin having altered Wouk's script himself to reflect a more modern timeline, setting it in the Persian Gulf, as opposed to the original's World War II setting. Principal photography began presumably in January 2023 and was completed sometime before star Lance Reddick's death in March. In the wake of his death, filmmaker Guillermo del Toro posted a tweet, praising the actor's performance in the film.

Del Toro himself served as back-up director on the film for liability reasons, due to Friedkin's age, and had sat beside him every day during the shoot. Since the production had been operating on a tight schedule, Friedkin expected that everyone come to the set prepared so as to avoid doing any retakes. According to del Toro, rather than scold a particular actor who stumbled over a crucial line several times, Friedkin instead asked, "You wanna do it in an hour or so? Or we pick it up tomorrow?":

"The gesture was healing, soothing and put the entire set back in control. I had seen, at the ripe age of 58, that of th[e] many tools in Billy's arsenal, kindness was one of the most effective ones."

== Release ==
In March 2023, Paramount Global Content Distribution revived Republic Pictures, with The Caine Mutiny Court-Martial announced as one of its first acquisitions. The Caine Mutiny Court-Martial had its world premiere on September 3, 2023 at the 80th Venice International Film Festival where it screened out of competition. Upon its release, Paramount+ announced it will premiere the film in all international markets where the service is available. The film was released on Paramount+ with Showtime October 6, 2023, followed by a linear release on Showtime on October 8.

== Reception ==
=== Critical response ===
On the review aggregator website Rotten Tomatoes, 95% of 55 critics' reviews are positive, with an average rating of 7.3/10. The website's consensus reads: "The final film from a master of the medium, The Caine Mutiny Court-Martial serves as a gripping reminder that a single setting, a solid cast, and some sharply written dialogue is sometimes all you need." Metacritic, which uses a weighted average, assigned the film a score of 71 out of 100, based on 21 critics, indicating "generally favorable" reviews.

Pete Hammond, in his review for Deadline Hollywood, wrote that the film is "solid and no-frills".

=== Accolades ===
Award	Year	Category	Recipient	Result	Ref.
29th Critics' Choice Awards	2024	Best Movie Made for Television	The Caine Mutiny Court-Martial	Nominated	
29th Critics' Choice Awards	2024	Best Actor in a Limited Series or Movie Made for Television	Kiefer Sutherland	Nominated	
