= The Caine Mutiny Court-Martial (play) =

1953 courtroom drama play by Herman Wouk

First edition of the Wouk novel The Caine Mutiny

The Caine Mutiny Court-Martial is a play dramatized for the stage by Herman Wouk, from his own 1951 novel, The Caine Mutiny. It was first staged in 1953, with Henry Fonda, John Hodiak, and Lloyd Nolan, directed by Charles Laughton and produced by Paul Gregory.

Wouk's novel covered a long stretch of time aboard United States Navy destroyer minesweeper USS Caine in the Pacific. It begins with Willis Keith's assignment to Caine, chronicles the mismanagement of the ship under Philip Francis Queeg, explains how Steve Maryk relieved Lt. Commander Philip Francis Queeg of command, gives an account of Maryk's court-martial, and describes the aftermath of the mutiny for all involved.

The play covers only the court-martial itself. Like jurors at a trial, the audience knows only what various witnesses tell of the events aboard Caine.

== Plot ==
The action takes place in The General Court-Martial Room of the Twelfth Naval District, San Francisco and in the banquet room of the Fairmont Hotel, San Francisco in February, 1945.

=== Act 1: The Prosecution ===
Lieutenant Stephen Maryk of the United States Naval Reserve is on trial for mutiny, because he relieved Lt. Commander Philip Francis Queeg of duty as captain of USS Caine during a typhoon on December 18, 1944. Maryk insists that Queeg had gone over the edge mentally, and that his paranoid delusions were putting the ship in danger. Maryk took command, applying Article 184 of Navy Regulations, and steered Caine directly into the storm—the opposite in what Queeg had wanted. Caine and her entire crew survived, and rescued survivors from a capsized navy vessel, which Maryk thinks is proof that he acted appropriately.

Maryk's lawyer, Lt. Barney Greenwald, indicates that he thinks Maryk, whom he would much rather have prosecuted in the court-martial, was guilty. But he is determined to offer a strong defense nonetheless.

Philip Francis Queeg is the first witness for the prosecution, being conducted by Lt. Commander John Challee. Queeg states that, while Caine was going through a typhoon, Steve Maryk, a disloyal and disgruntled officer, rebelled against him and relieved him of command without justification.

At this stage of the court-martial, Queeg is portrayed as a tough military disciplinarian—perhaps excessively so, but giving no reason to believe he has psychological problems. He is depicted as confident and articulate, and in full possession of his faculties.

A young signalman, Junius Urban, who was present on the bridge at the time Maryk took control, is called to testify about what happened. Urban provides a measure of comic relief, as he is poorly educated, extremely nervous, and confused about exactly what happened. His testimony tells the jury very little, but on cross-examination he lets slip that Queeg was "a nut" on numerous small matters of discipline and tidiness.

Captain Randolph Southard, an experienced naval officer called as an expert on destroyer ship-handling, testifies that, under the weather circumstances described on the night of the mutiny, Queeg took all the proper measures, and did exactly what a commanding officer should have done. Thus, in Southard's view, Maryk's actions were completely unjustified. However, under cross examination from Greenwald, Southard concedes that there are rare, extreme circumstances under which sailing directly into the storm would be the only way to avoid sinking.

Two psychiatrists who have examined Queeg, Dr. Forrest Lundeen and Dr. Allen Bird, testify that, while Queeg is far from being an ideal officer, in that he can be arrogant, overly defensive, nervous, and a bit of a bully, he is not mentally ill. Under cross-examination from Greenwald, however, each of them, Dr. Lundeen in particular, acknowledges that some of Queeg's traits do come close to the textbook definition of paranoia.

Willis Keith, a friend of Maryk's, testifies as to the events leading to the mutiny. Keith says that Queeg was a coward, that he was giving panicky, conflicting orders during the typhoon, requiring Maryk to take action. During cross-examination, Greenwald gets Keith to tell numerous stories of Queeg's ineptitude, vanity, dishonesty, pettiness and seeming cowardice; indeed, one such incident led Caine's officers to give Queeg the nickname "Old Yellowstain."

Lt. Thomas Keefer, another friend of Maryk's, is a much less helpful witness from the defense standpoint. Keefer, an intellectual who was a writer in civilian life, having published some of his short stories in national magazines, indicates that Queeg was not insane, and that Maryk was ill-advised to relieve him of command. Maryk is stunned by Keefer's betrayal, since to a large extent, Keefer was the one who convinced Maryk that Queeg might be insane in the first place, and Maryk wants Greenwald to cross-examine him vigorously. Instead, Greenwald has no questions for Keefer, explaining to Maryk, "Implicating Keefer harms you." He wants one hero, not two mutineers.

As the trial adjourns for the day, Maryk expresses dissatisfaction with Greenwald's defense. Greenwald explains that he has good reasons for not asking Keefer any questions, and states once again that he thinks Maryk is guilty. Even if Queeg was far from an ideal officer, Greenwald believes, Maryk's first duty was to carry on fighting the war, and doing his best to keep Caine in action. All authority figures tend to look like irrational tyrants to their subordinates, Greenwald says, whether they are or not.

=== Act 2: The Defense ===
==== Scene 1 ====
As Greenwald begins his defense the following morning, he calls Steve Maryk as the first of his two witnesses.

Maryk explains in great detail what a petty, vindictive, isolated, and paranoid commanding officer Queeg was. In particular, Maryk dwells on "The Strawberry Incident," which convinced much of the crew that Queeg was insane. Shortly after the Caine had received a shipment of strawberries from another ship, a large portion went missing. Because the circumstances were superficially similar to another incident that had occurred during peacetime when Queeg was an ensign, he drew the same conclusion: someone must have stolen them from the wardroom icebox, using a copy of the original key to its padlock. Queeg's steadfast belief that this was a repeat of the same MO as the first thief led him to divert extraordinary amounts of manpower to search the ship thoroughly for a copy of the icebox-padlock key. When several of the enlisted men confessed to Maryk that they had simply stolen the strawberries from the icebox, and eaten them, before the icebox was padlocked, and that no duplicate key existed, Queeg's refusal to accept their confession and dedication to proving his theory convinces the officers that Queeg is trying to reenact the circumstances of his prior success against all evidence to the contrary. Finally, Maryk describes the events of the night of the mutiny itself. Maryk says Caine was foundering, on the verge of sinking, and that Queeg was too frightened and paranoid to take the proper steps to save the ship. Only at this most desperate moment did Maryk see fit to take command. After the ship was out of danger, Maryk wrote a full account of his actions in the ship's log. He claims that Queeg came to him and proposed erasing this embarrassing incident from the log—a serious breach of Naval ethics. Maryk refused to do so, electing instead to take full responsibility for his actions.

The prosecuting attorney, John Challee, asks Maryk about his background. Maryk answers that he is a fisherman's son, and has been around boats his whole life. However, Maryk confesses that he was only an average student in high school and a poor student in college. It becomes clear in Challee's cross-examination that, while Maryk uses words like "paranoid," he really knows little about psychology, and was not truly qualified to judge anyone's mental health.

At this point, Greenwald calls Queeg as his second and final defense witness. Under intense cross-examination, Queeg is asked to justify each and every one of his questionable actions as commanding officer of Caine. He becomes nervous and testy, and starts playing with a pair of steel balls that he uses to control his nerves. He tells a few small lies to cover up petty offenses. When his lies are revealed, his demeanor changes, and he becomes angry and combative. When asked about Maryk's charge that Queeg had wanted to alter the ship's log, an enraged Queeg rants that he was surrounded by disloyal officers, and he looks exactly like the panicky paranoid that Maryk had described.

By the time the defense rests, Queeg is a broken man, and everyone else present knows that Maryk will be acquitted. Maryk is relieved, if not totally ecstatic, and he invites Greenwald to a celebration party that Tom Keefer is hosting later that evening. (Keefer has written a novel about the war, titled Multitudes, Multitudes, and even though it is still not finished, he has received an advance of one thousand dollars from a publisher.) Greenwald looks dejected and far from triumphant, but he reluctantly agrees to attend the party.

==== Scene 2 ====
At the party, Keefer, Keith, Maryk and their friends are celebrating both Maryk's acquittal and the large advance that Keefer has received on Multitudes, Multitudes, when Greenwald walks in, heavily intoxicated from a number of drinks he and Challee had shared before he showed up to the party, over which they had discussed details Greenwald had left out of the case at the end of the trial. (The two men had been law-school classmates, and good friends, before both had enlisted. Challee had accused Greenwald, during the trial, of "shyster tactics," and Greenwald had invited Challee for drinks after the trial to smooth things over and to provide such details. These had resulted in Challee understanding the reasons for Greenwald's trial strategy, and the two had once again parted as friends.) Greenwald proposes a toast to "Old Yellowstain." Unlike Caine's junior officers, Greenwald feels deep regret over what he did to Queeg on the witness stand. To Greenwald, though Phil Queeg was a weak man, perhaps he was still an admirable one, and Queeg and career military men like him are actually heroic figures, since they were the ones putting their lives on the line to defend America – something none of the others were doing because they knew they could never truly enrich themselves financially in the armed forces. Greenwald, who is Jewish, understands what the consequences would have been had the Axis won World War II. He refers to Nazi atrocities, declaring, at one point, that it is men like Queeg who have saved his own mother, Mrs. Greenwald, from having been "melted down to a bar of soap." He points out to Maryk, "Steve, this dinner's a phony. You're guilty. 'Course you're only half guilty. There's another guy who's stayed very neatly out of the picture."

Greenwald feels sorry for Queeg, because he sees that Queeg was not wrong about being surrounded by disloyal officers. Greenwald believes that Tom Keefer is the guiltiest party in the whole affair. Maryk, after all, really knew very little about psychology or psychiatry, so where would he have obtained any of his half-formed ideas about paranoia and mental illness, if not from Keefer?

Greenwald had defended Maryk to the best of his abilities, which had led him to destroy Queeg on the witness stand, because he had seen that Maryk was essentially a decent man trying to do the right thing. He views Keefer, on the other hand, as an upper-class intellectual snob who had regarded himself as superior to Queeg, the career military man, and had helped turn Maryk and the rest of the crew against him. Greenwald suggests that Maryk could even have reasoned with Queeg during the typhoon had Keefer not poisoned the atmosphere in the first place.

Greenwald denounces Keefer, and throws a glassful of yellow wine into his face (echoing the insulting nickname of "Old Yellowstain" the crew members had given to Queeg), before walking out of the party, an act which ruins it.

== Characters ==
- Captain Blakely: chief judge of the court-martial
- Stephen Maryk: Queeg's executive officer aboard Caine, and the officer who relieved Queeg of duty
- Barney Greenwald: Maryk's defense attorney
- Willis Keith: a junior officer aboard Caine
- Lt. Commander Philip Francis Queeg: commanding officer of Caine
- Thomas Keefer: an erudite, educated junior officer on Caine
- John Challee: the prosecutor
- Randolph Patterson Southard: a Navy captain, called as an expert witness on destroyers
- Dr. Allen Winston Bird & Dr. Forrest Lundeen: a pair of psychiatrists called to testify about Queeg's mental fitness
- Junius Hannaford Urban: a young signalman on Caine, called as a witness to the mutiny

== Stage casts ==
Characters	Original	Revival	Revival
Characters	1954	1983	2006
Lt. Greenwald	Henry Fonda	John Rubinstein	David Schwimmer
Lt. Maryk	John Hodiak	Jay O. Sanders	Joe Sikora
Lt. Comm. Queeg	Lloyd Nolan	Michael Moriarty	Željko Ivanek
Capt. Blakely	Russell Hicks	Stephen Joyce	Terry Beaver
Dr. Bird	Herbert Anderson	Geoffrey Horne	Tom Nelis
Court Member	Larry Barton	Clinton Allmon	Peter Bradbury
Capt. Southard	Paul Birch	Brad Sullivan	Murphy Guyer
Court Member	Jim Bumgarner	Warren Ball	Michael Quinlan
Dr. Lundeen	Stephen Chase	Leon B. Stevens	Brian Reddy
Court Member	Richard Farmer	Sam Coppola	Brian Russell
Sm. 3rd Class Urban	Eddie Firestone	Jace Alexander	Paul David Story
Lt. Keefer	Robert Gist	J. Kenneth Campbell	Geoffrey Nauffts
Stenographer	John Huffman	Tom Paliferro	Tom Gottlieb
Court Member	T.H. Jourdan	Daniel Davin	Doug Stender
Lt. (Jr. Grade) Keith	Charles Nolte	Jonathan Hogan	Ben Fox
Court Member / Party Guest	Richard Norris	Oliver Dixon	Greg McFadden
Lt. Comm. Challee	Ainslie Pryor	William Atherton	Timothy Daly
Orderly	Greg Roman	Richard Arbolino	Robert L. Devaney
Orderly / Party Guest	Pat Waltz		Denis Butkus

== Production history ==
The play was first presented by Paul Gregory in the Granada Theatre, Santa Barbara, California, on October 13, 1953, and then went on tour across the United States before being given its first performance on Broadway at the Plymouth Theatre on January 20, 1954, in a production directed by Charles Laughton and produced by Paul Gregory. The play starred Henry Fonda as Barney Greenwald, the accused mutineer's defense attorney, and John Hodiak as the accused, Steve Maryk; Lloyd Nolan played Queeg. Herbert Anderson played Dr. Bird (he would later go on to play Ensign Rabbit in the 1954 film version of the novel). James Garner appeared in a non speaking role as a court martial panelist. It ran for 415 performances.

In 1955, actor Paul Douglas was placed on probation by Actors Equity while appearing in the play for allegedly saying, "The South stinks. It's a land of sowbelly and segregation," which offended Southern audiences. Douglas claimed that he was misquoted.

It was revived in 1983 at the Stamford Center for the Arts, Stamford, Connecticut and then at the Circle in the Square Theatre in a production directed by Arthur Sherman with John Rubinstein and Michael Moriarty, with Jay O. Sanders as Maryk. Former New York Jets quarterback Joe Namath (widely known as "Broadway Joe") replaced Sanders during the run of the show, marking his only appearance on Broadway.

Charlton Heston directed a critically acclaimed production in Los Angeles and London in 1984 in which he starred as Queeg. Heston later brought the production to the Kennedy Center's Eisenhower Theater, where it again garnered critical acclaim. Heston would later direct a Chinese-translated production that premiered at the Beijing People's Art Theatre on October 18, 1988, with Chinese actor Zhu Xu as Queeg, and another one in 2006, with Feng Yuanzheng as Queeg.

The play was first presented on television live in 1955, with Lloyd Nolan and Robert Gist repeating their stage roles as Queeg and Lt. Keefer, respectively, but with Barry Sullivan as Greenwald and Frank Lovejoy as Lt. Maryk. It was staged as an episode of the anthology series Ford Star Jubilee.

In 1988, Robert Altman directed another made-for-television version of The Caine Mutiny Court-Martial for Columbia Pictures Television (CPT). The cast included Eric Bogosian as Barney Greenwald, Jeff Daniels as Maryk, Brad Davis as Queeg, Peter Gallagher as John Challee, Kevin J. O'Connor as Tom Keefer, Daniel Jenkins as Willie Keith, and Altman regular Michael Murphy as Captain Blakely. The production was first broadcast on May 8, 1988, and was subsequently released on VHS, LaserDisc, and DVD.

The play was again revived on Broadway in 2006 at the Gerald Schoenfeld Theatre in a production directed by Jerry Zaks, starring Željko Ivanek as Queeg, Timothy Daly as prosecutor Lt. Cmdr. John Challee and David Schwimmer as Greenwald.

== Awards and nominations ==
=== 1983 Broadway revival ===
Year	Award	Category	Nominee	Result
1983	Tony Award	Best Revival		Nominated
1983	Drama Desk Award	Outstanding Revival		Nominated
1983	Drama Desk Award	Outstanding Actor in a Play	John Rubinstein	Nominated
1983	Drama Desk Award	Outstanding Featured Actor in a Play	Stephen Joyce	Nominated
1983	Drama Desk Award	Outstanding Featured Actor in a Play	Michael Moriarty	Nominated
1983	Drama Desk Award	Outstanding Direction of a Play	Arthur Sherman	Nominated

=== 2006 Broadway revival ===
Year	Award	Category	Nominee	Result
2006	Tony Award	Best Actor in a Play	Zeljko Ivanek	Nominated
2006	Drama Desk Award	Outstanding Revival of a Play		Nominated
2006	Drama Desk Award	Outstanding Actor in a Play	Zeljko Ivanek	Nominated
2006	Drama Desk Award	Outstanding Direction of a Play	Jerry Zaks	Nominated

== See also ==
- The Caine Mutiny – Herman Wouk's original novel
- The Caine Mutiny (1954 film) – the 1954 film based on it
- The Caine Mutiny Court-Martial (1955 film) – 1955 American TV play version
- The Caine Mutiny (1959 film) – 1959 Australian TV play version
- The Caine Mutiny Court-Martial (2023 film) – 2023 film adaptation
