= The Paterno =

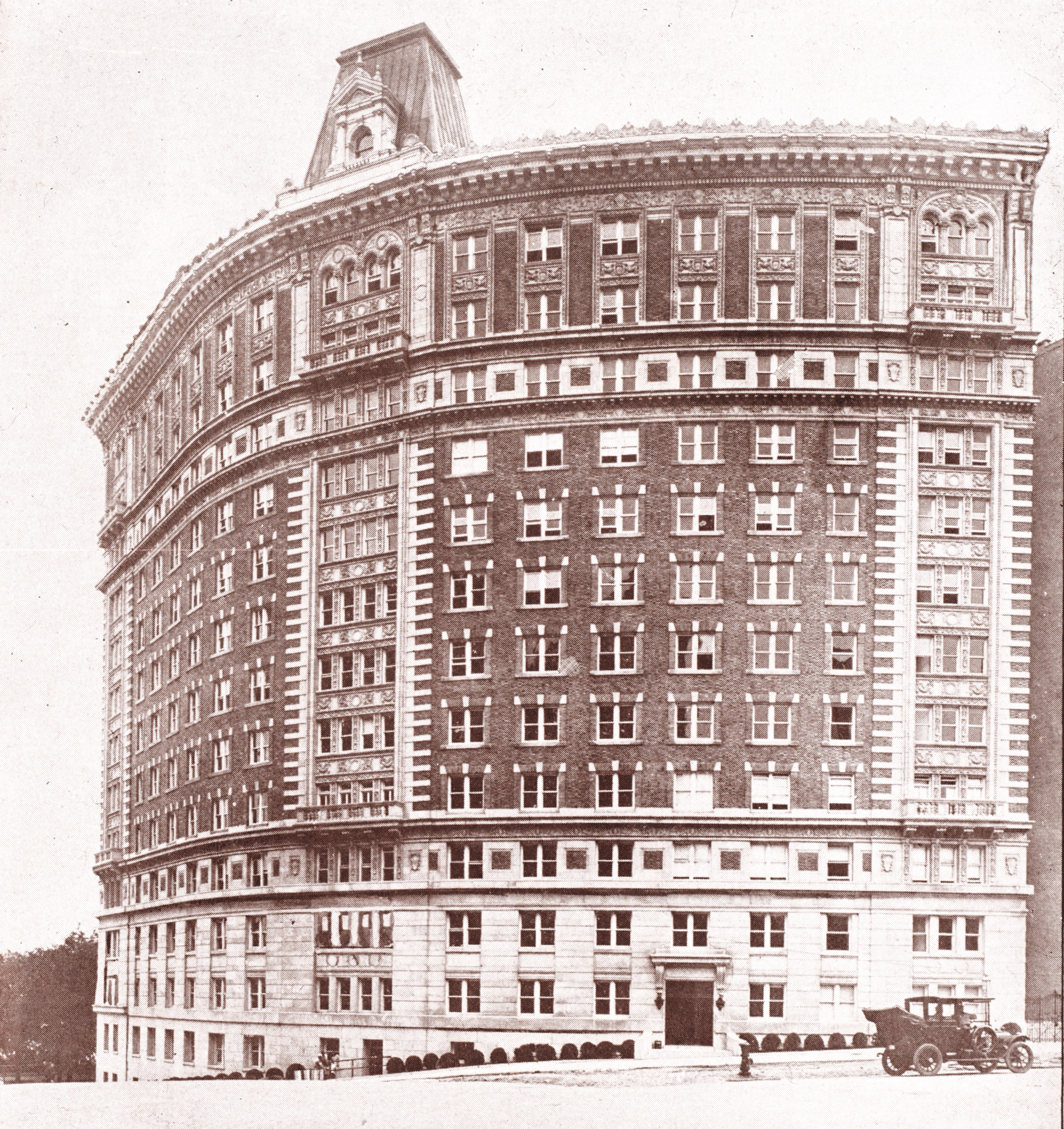
- (1910)
- Alternative names: Paterno Apartments

General information
- Type: Residential
- Architectural style: Renaissance Revival
- Location: 440 Riverside Drive; Morningside Heights, Manhattan, New York City
- Coordinates: 40°48′32.06″N 73°57′54.98″W
- Construction started: 1909
- Completed: 1910

Height
- Height: 144 ft (44 m)

Technical details
- Floor count: 13

Design and construction
- Architecture firm: Schwartz & Gross
- Developer: Paterno Brothers

The Paterno is a Manhattan apartment building located at 116th Street and Riverside Drive and also known as 440 Riverside Drive. The building is noted for its curved facade, impressive marble lobby with a stained-glass ceiling, and substantial porte-cochère. Across 116th Street, The Paterno faces the Colosseum, another building with a similar curved facade. The New York Times has said that the "opposing curves, [form] a gateway as impressive as any publicly built arch or plaza in New York.

The Paterno and Colosseum were both developed by Charles V. Paterno and designed by the architectural firm of Schwartz & Gross.

The Paterno has been featured in the films Enemies, A Love Story in 1966, Enchanted in 2007 and Disenchanted in 2022.
