= The Caine Mutiny Court-Martial (1955 film) =

- Genre: War
- Based on: play The Caine Mutiny Court Martial by Herman Wouk
- Written by: Paul Gregory Franklin J. Schaffner Herman Wouk
- Directed by: Franklin J. Schaffner
- Starring: Barry Sullivan Lloyd Nolan
- Country of origin: United States
- Original language: English

Production
- Producer: Paul Gregory

Original release
- Release: November 19, 1955

The Caine Mutiny Court-Martial is a TV play directed by Franklin J. Schaffner, based on Herman Wouk's play The Caine Mutiny Court-Martial, that was broadcast on November 19, 1955, on Ford Star Jubilee as a live drama during The Golden Age of American Television.

== Cast ==
- Barry Sullivan as Barney Greenwald
- Lloyd Nolan as Lieutenant Commander Phillip Francis Queeg
- Frank Lovejoy as Lieutenant Maryak
- Raymond Bailey as Capt. Randolph Southard

== Recognition ==
At the 1956 Emmy Awards, The Caine Mutiny Court-Martial won for Best Television Adaptation, the award going to Schaffner and Paul Gregory. Schaffner also won for Best Director-Live Series.

Both Sullivan and Nolan had appeared in the Broadway play.

Barry Sullivan received an Emmy nomination for playing defense attorney Barney Greenwald, the role created by Henry Fonda on the Broadway stage and played by Jose Ferrer in the 1954 film. Sullivan had replaced Fonda on Broadway.

Sullivan lost the Emmy to castmate Lloyd Nolan, who won for playing Captain Queeg, the role he had originated in the Broadway play.
