= The Caine Mutiny (1959 film) =

- Genre: War
- Based on: play The Caine Mutiny Court-Martial by Herman Wouk
- Directed by: Peter Randall
- Country of origin: Australia
- Original language: English

Production
- Producer: Dorothy Crawford

Original release
- Release: 11 January 1959 (Melbourne)
- Release: 7 February 1959 (Sydney)

The Caine Mutiny is a 1959 Australian TV play based on The Caine Mutiny Court-Martial broadcast by Melbourne's Channel 7. It was the first full-length live drama to be presented on a commercial TV channel and was broadcast on 11 January 1959 over two hours. Peter Randall produced and the cast had performed the play for three weeks at the Little Theatre in South Yarra.

It was the first live TV drama in Australia to not come from the ABC studios.

== Cast ==
- George Fairfax as Barney Greenwald
- Kevin Colebrook as Commander Queeg
- Robert Gardiner as Maryak

== Reception ==
The Age called it "a triumph".
