= Charles Schwab =

Charles Schwab may refer to:

- Charles M. Schwab (1862–1939), American steel magnate of Bethlehem Steel
- Charles R. Schwab (born 1937), American broker and founder of the Charles Schwab Corporation
- Charles Schwab Corporation, an American multinational financial services company, stockbroker and bank
- Charles Schwab Cup Championship, a PGA Tour Champions golf tournament
- Charles Schwab Challenge at Colonial, a PGA Tour golf tournament
- Charles Schwab Field, Nebraska, United States, a baseball park

== See also ==
- Charles M. Schwab House, a mansion in Manhattan
