= Riverside Drive (Manhattan) =

Avenue in New York City

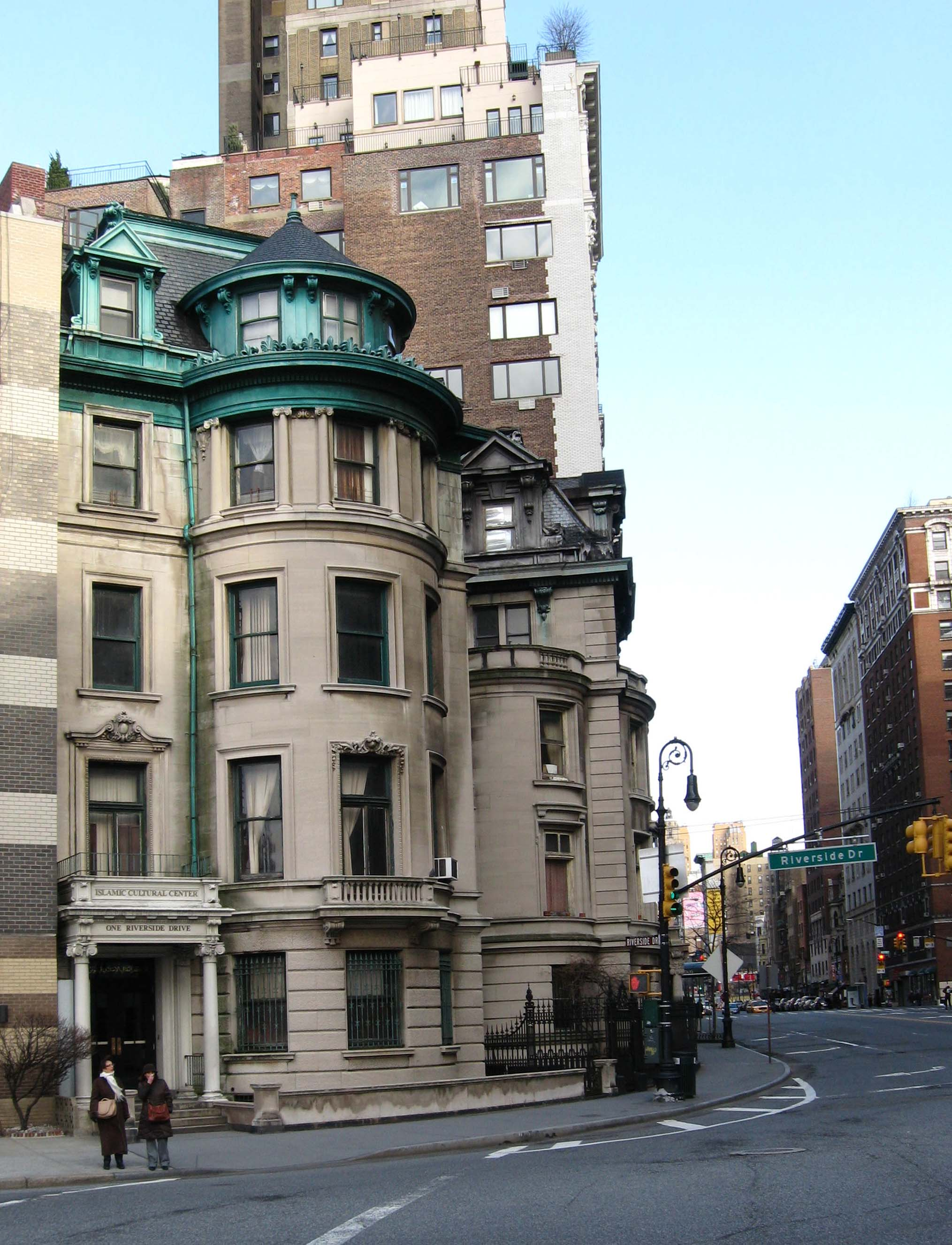
- 1 Riverside Drive, at 72nd Street
- Interactive map of Riverside Drive
- Namesake: Hudson River
- Owner: City of New York
- Maintained by: NYCDOT
- Location: Manhattan, New York City, US
- South end: 72nd Street in Upper West Side
- North end: 181st Street in Washington Heights; Dyckman Street in Inwood (disconnected segment)
- East: West End Avenue (72nd–107th Sts); Broadway (107th–116th, 127–159th Sts); Claremont Avenue (116th–127th Sts (Tiemann Pl)); Fort Washington Avenue (159th–168th Sts); Haven Avenue (168th–181st Sts)
- West: Henry Hudson Parkway

Construction
- Commissioned: 1868
- Construction start: 1872
- Completed: 1880 (original section), 1928 (final extension)

Riverside Drive is a north–south avenue in the New York City borough of Manhattan. The road runs on the west side of Upper Manhattan, generally paralleling the Hudson River and Riverside Park between 72nd Street and the vicinity of the George Washington Bridge at 181st Street. North of 96th Street, Riverside Drive is a wide divided roadway. At several locations, a serpentine service road diverges from the main road, providing access to the residential buildings. Several viaducts connect the various segments of Riverside Drive, including the 2,047-foot (624 m) Manhattan Valley Viaduct between Tiemann Place and 135th Street. A disconnected section of Riverside Drive exists in Inwood, Manhattan. The New York City Landmarks Preservation Commission has designated the original section of Riverside Drive, between 72nd and 125th streets, as part of a scenic landmark that also includes Riverside Park.

Riverside Drive was proposed as part of Riverside Park, which was established by land condemnation in 1872. Originally known as Riverside Avenue, the road opened in 1880 and originally ran between 72nd Street and the current site of Grant's Tomb. The park and avenue were originally designed by architects and horticulturalists such as Calvert Vaux and Samuel Parsons. Riverside Drive was extended north to 155th Street in the 1900s, and a viaduct carrying Riverside Drive West between 155th and 161st streets was built in the 1920s. Traffic flow on Riverside Drive was modified several times throughout the years, and the viaducts have been renovated as well. A southern extension, known as Riverside Boulevard, was built starting in the 1990s as the Riverside South complex was developed.

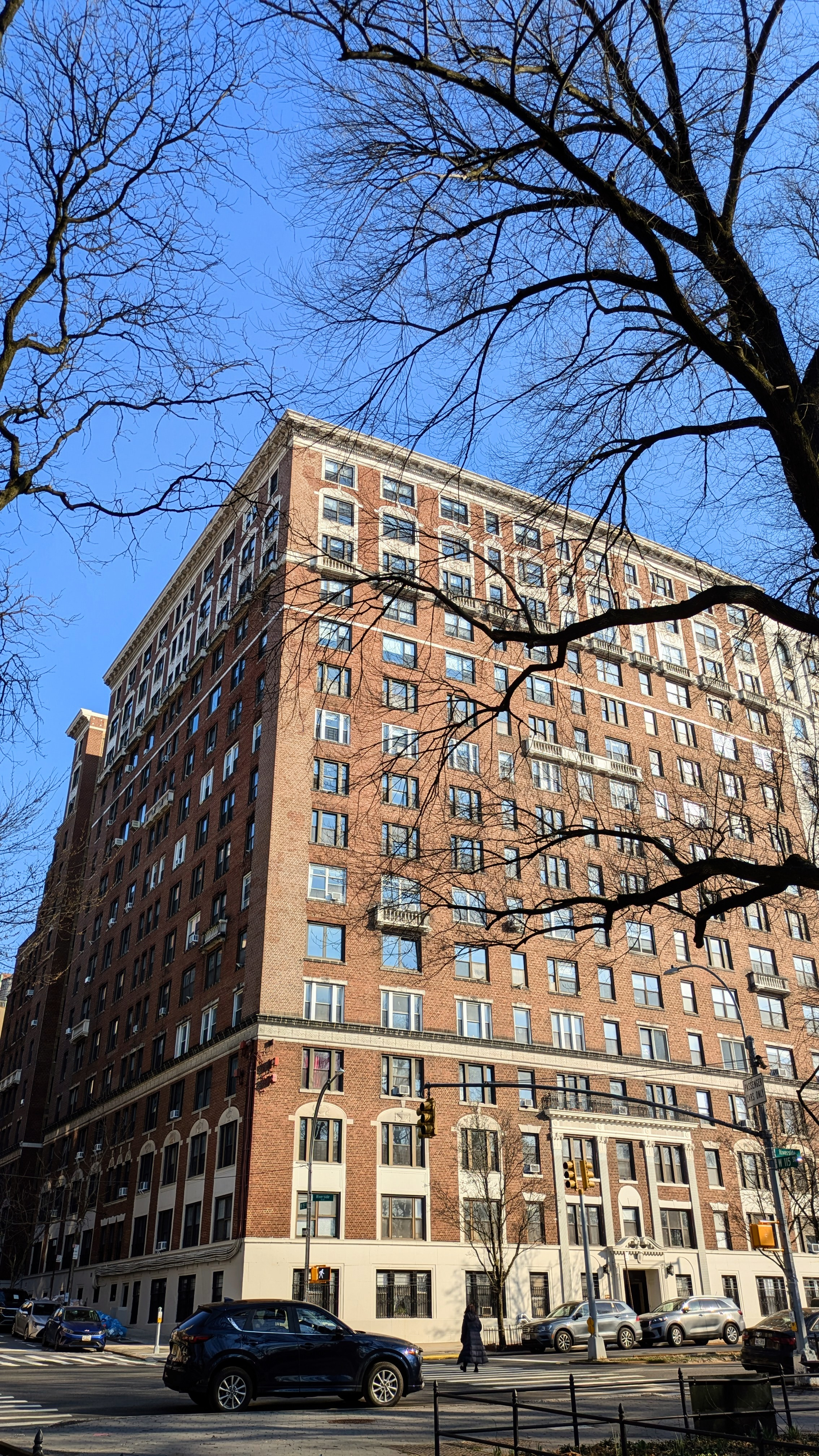
425 Riverside Drive, a prominent pre-war apartment building completed in 1925

Between 72nd and 125th streets, nearly every block of Riverside Drive is part of a New York City historic district, and the buildings on these blocks date from before World War II. The eastern side of Riverside Drive originally included luxuriously finished row-houses interspersed with free-standing mansions, though few of the mansions remain. Some remaining mansions are the Schinasi Mansion on 107th and the Isaac L. Rice Mansion on 89th. Many of Riverside Drive's apartment buildings date from between the 1900s and the 1930s, with curving facades along the avenue; some of these buildings are designated as city landmarks. Along Riverside Drive, there are also numerous monuments such as Grant's Tomb and the Soldiers' and Sailors' Monument, in addition to other structures such as Riverside Church. Riverside Drive has received commentary for its landscape features and architecture, and it has been depicted in works of popular media.

== Route description ==
Starting at 72nd Street, Riverside Drive passes through the Upper West Side, Morningside Heights, Manhattanville, Hamilton Heights, and Washington Heights neighborhoods in Manhattan. Commercial vehicles are banned from parts of Riverside Drive.

Unlike other avenues in Manhattan (which are typically straight), Riverside Drive is curved because its original designer, Frederick Law Olmsted, did not like sharp corners. A narrow service road diverges from Riverside Drive at several points, creating traffic islands. For a short stretch near 122nd Street, the avenue splits into two roadways, one each to the west and east of Grant's Tomb; the western roadway carries southbound traffic, while the eastern roadway carries northbound traffic. There are several viaducts along the route of Riverside Drive, including at 96th Street on the Upper West Side; between Tiemann Place and 135th Street in Manhattanville; and between 155th and 161st streets in Hamilton Heights. The street atop the viaduct in Hamilton Heights is officially named Riverside Drive West, while the original Riverside Drive curves inland.

North of 181st Street, Riverside Drive merges with the northbound lanes of the Henry Hudson Parkway; as such, there is a gap in the road between 181st Street and Dyckman Street. A disconnected section of Riverside Drive begins at the Henry Hudson Parkway's Dyckman Street exit in Inwood, ending at Broadway. South of 72nd Street, Riverside Drive continues as Riverside Boulevard, which extends south to 59th Street.

=== Viaducts ===
==== 96th Street ====
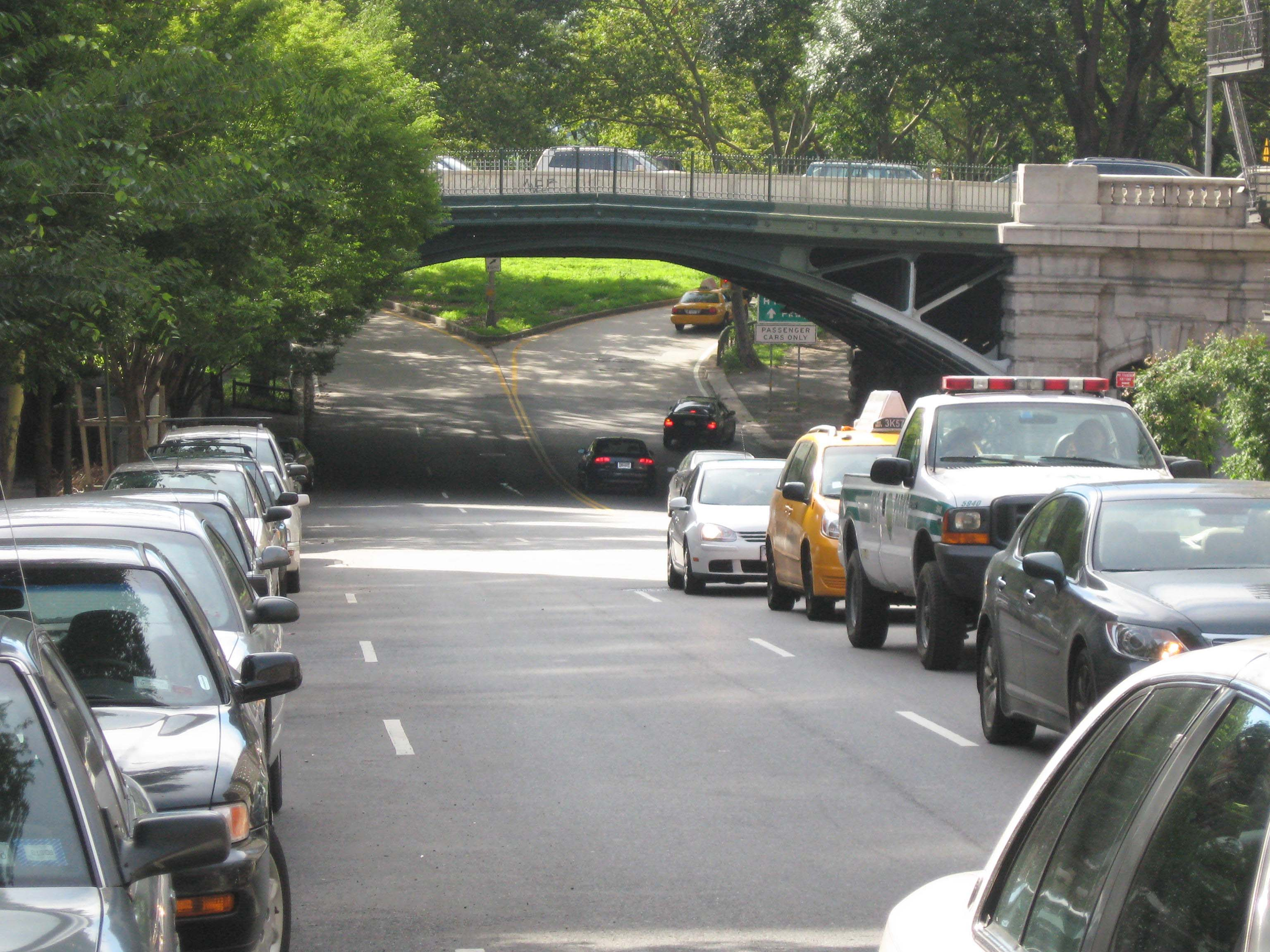
The bridge carrying Riverside Drive above 96th Street

A small bridge carries Riverside Drive over 96th Street. The bridge, also known as the Riverside Bridge, was designed by Carrère and Hastings. When this overpass was built, it was described as a viaduct with buttresses and stone terraces leading down to Riverside Park and the Hudson River. Semicircular shelters were also built next to the viaduct on either side of 96th Street. Although the overpass is clad with stone, its superstructure is made of steel. As built, it had four elaborate electric lampposts, each measuring 15 feet (4.6 m) high.

==== Manhattan Valley Viaduct ====
Between Tiemann Place and 135th Street is the Manhattan Valley Viaduct, which carries Riverside Drive above 12th Avenue. Built in 1901, it is variously called the 125th Street Viaduct or Riverside Drive Viaduct. Murray Roe designed the Manhattan Valley Viaduct, while Francis Stuart Williamson was the chief engineer. Despite the structure's utilitarian role as a highway, it was also a strong symbol of civic pride, inspired by America's late 19th-century City Beautiful movement. The viaduct's original roadway, wide pedestrian walks and overall design was highly ornamented. The surrounding area is part of the Manhattanville valley, which contains a fault.

As planned, the viaduct measured 1,564 feet (477 m) long, excluding the approaches. The viaduct carries a roadway measuring 60 feet (18 m) wide, as well as a 10-foot (3.0 m) wide sidewalk on either side of the viaduct. The viaduct measures 95 feet (29 m) above mean high water at 125th Street and 75 feet (23 m) above mean high water at 135th Street. It is divided into 26 bays, each comprising a single span. Twenty-two of the spans are 65 feet (20 m) long; one of the spans, crossing 125th Street, is 128 feet (39 m) long; and the three northernmost spans are of irregular length. Each arch is composed of latticed plate girders measuring 3 feet (0.91 m) long. Under the roadway are 60-foot-wide (18 m) transverse steel girders, which were built in several pieces and riveted together; each girder is 5 feet (1.5 m) deep. The main span above 125th Street is supported by two plate girders measuring 130 by 10 by 8 feet (39.6 by 3.0 by 2.4 m) across, which were described as the world's largest steel girders at the time of the viaduct's completion. In total, about 400 girders are used to support the roadway.

Including the approaches to the south and north, the viaduct has a total length of 2,044 feet (623 m) or 2,074 feet (632 m). The northern approach is 262 feet (80 m) long, while the southern approach is 218 feet (66 m) long. The approaches are of rock-faced Mohawk Valley limestone with Maine granite trimmings, the face work being made up of courses of ashlar. The southern approach consists of a semicircular wall with stone staircases on either side. This was intended to give a broad plaza effect, which was intended to impart deliberate grandeur to the natural terminus of much of Riverside Drive's traffic as well as to give full advantage to the vista overlooking the Hudson River and New Jersey Palisades to the west. There is also a single masonry arch with a glazed-brick vault next to the southern approach.

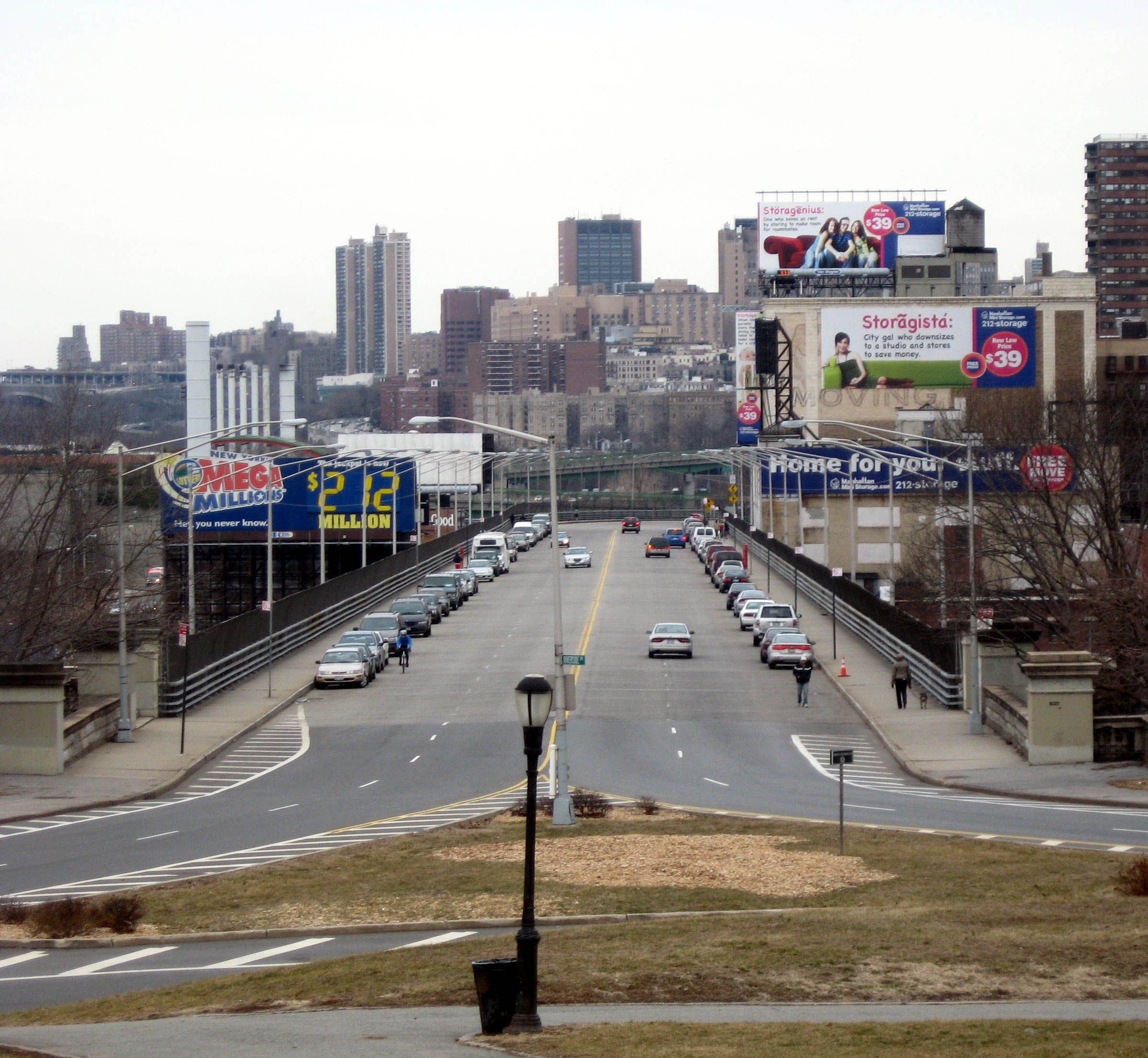
The Manhattan Valley Viaduct as seen from the median north of Grant's Tomb

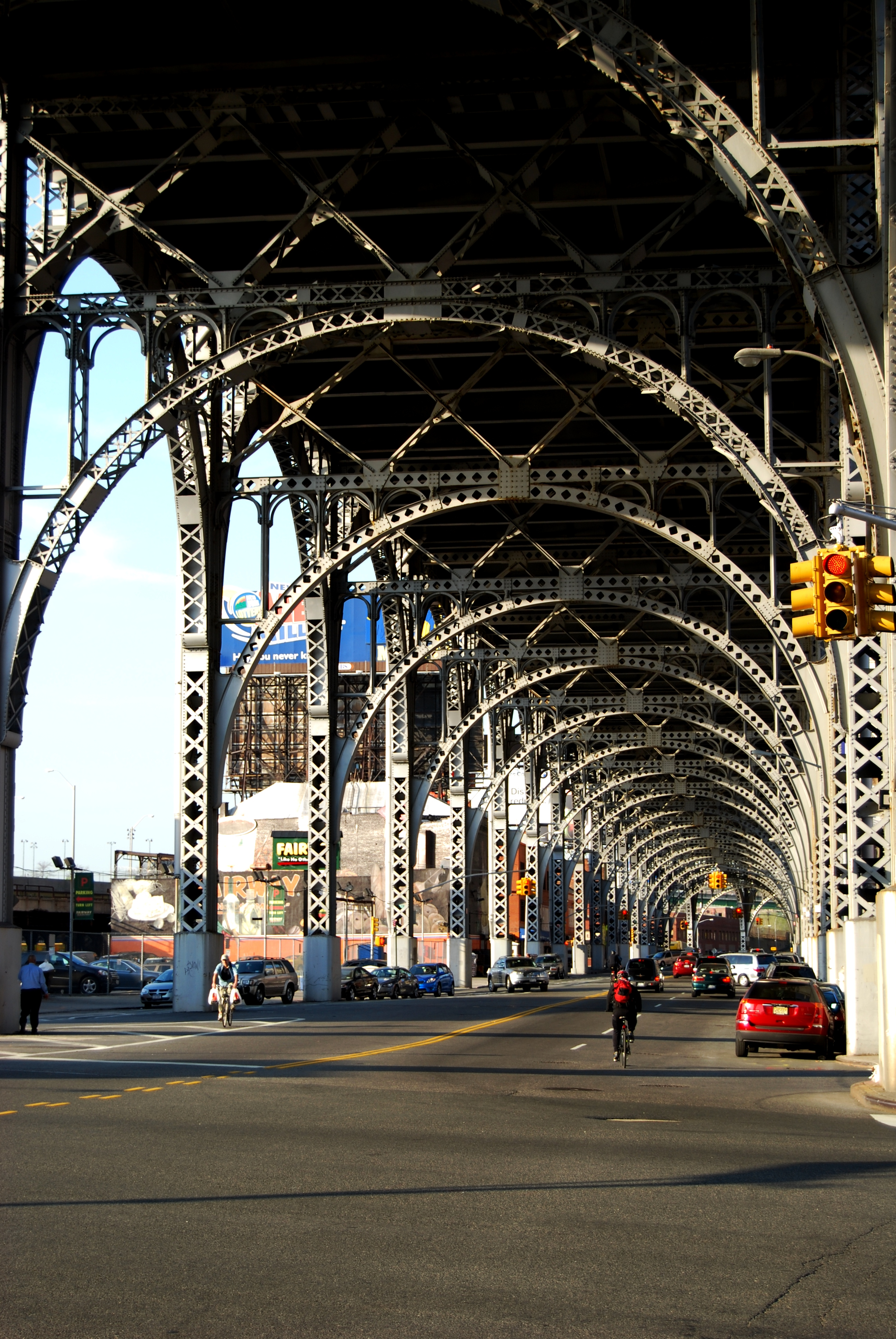
Below, facing north

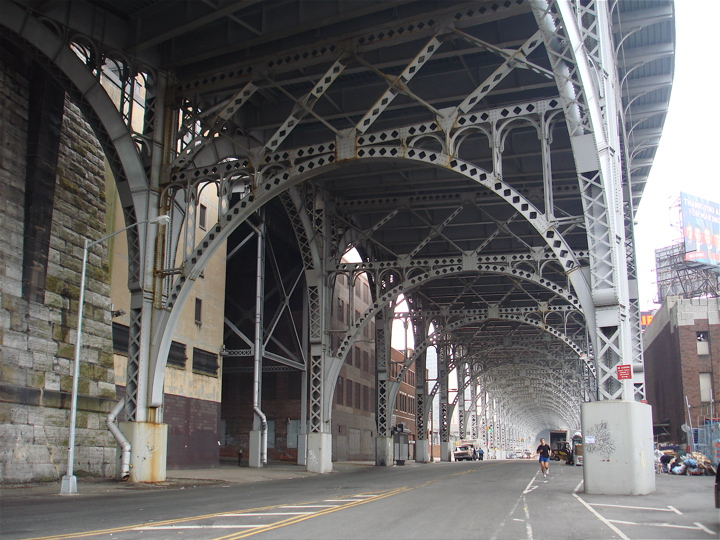
Below, facing south

==== 155th to 161st streets ====
Another viaduct carries Riverside Drive between 155th and 161st streets. This viaduct is 0.25 miles (0.40 km) long and carries a 60-foot-wide (18 m) roadway with six lanes of traffic. The viaduct's construction required 11.6 million pounds (5.3 kt) of steel, 108,000 square feet (10,000 m^{2}) of asphalt pavement, 120,000 square feet (11,000 m^{2}) of masonry, and 810,000 cubic feet (23,000 m^{3}) of concrete. The structure is carried upon a steel-beam framework, which is encased in granite cladding. The roadway itself is made of concrete slabs, paved over with asphalt. The arches under the roadway are infilled with granite or paneled concrete and are topped by metal-framed windows. The roadway itself has granite balustrades with ornamental lampposts. There is about 77,000 square feet (7,200 m^{2}) of storage space under the viaduct. In the mid-20th century, the space was used to store thousands of plaster casts owned by the Metropolitan Museum of Art.

=== Transportation ===
Riverside Drive is served by several bus routes. New York City Bus's M5 route covers Riverside Drive south of 135th Street, while the M11 serves the avenue from 135th to 145th Street. The Bx6 and Bx6 SBS serve Riverside Drive East and Riverside Drive West, terminating at 158th Street. The westbound M72 runs on Riverside Boulevard from 70th to 66th streets; eastbound buses use Freedom Place. Because Riverside Drive and the neighboring Riverside Park are designated as a New York City scenic landmark from 72nd to 125th streets, the western sidewalk between these streets does not have any bus stop shelters. There is no New York City Subway service along Riverside Drive, though the 1, 2, and 3 trains run on the parallel Broadway–Seventh Avenue Line for much of the avenue's length. The Dyckman Street station on the A train serves the disconnected northern section of Riverside Drive in Inwood.

== History ==
=== Development ===
The 191 acres (0.77 km^{2}) of land in what is now Riverside Park between 72nd and 125th streets were originally inhabited by the Lenape people, but by the 18th century were used for farms by the descendants of European colonists. A small number of buildings were constructed nearby in the mid-19th century, including the New York Orphan Asylum between 73rd and 74th streets. In 1846, the Hudson River Railroad (later the West Side Line and Hudson Line) was built along the waterfront, connecting New York City to Albany. As late as the 1860s, the adjacent section of the Upper West Side was still sparsely populated, even though there was residential development on the Upper East Side.

==== Riverside Drive ====
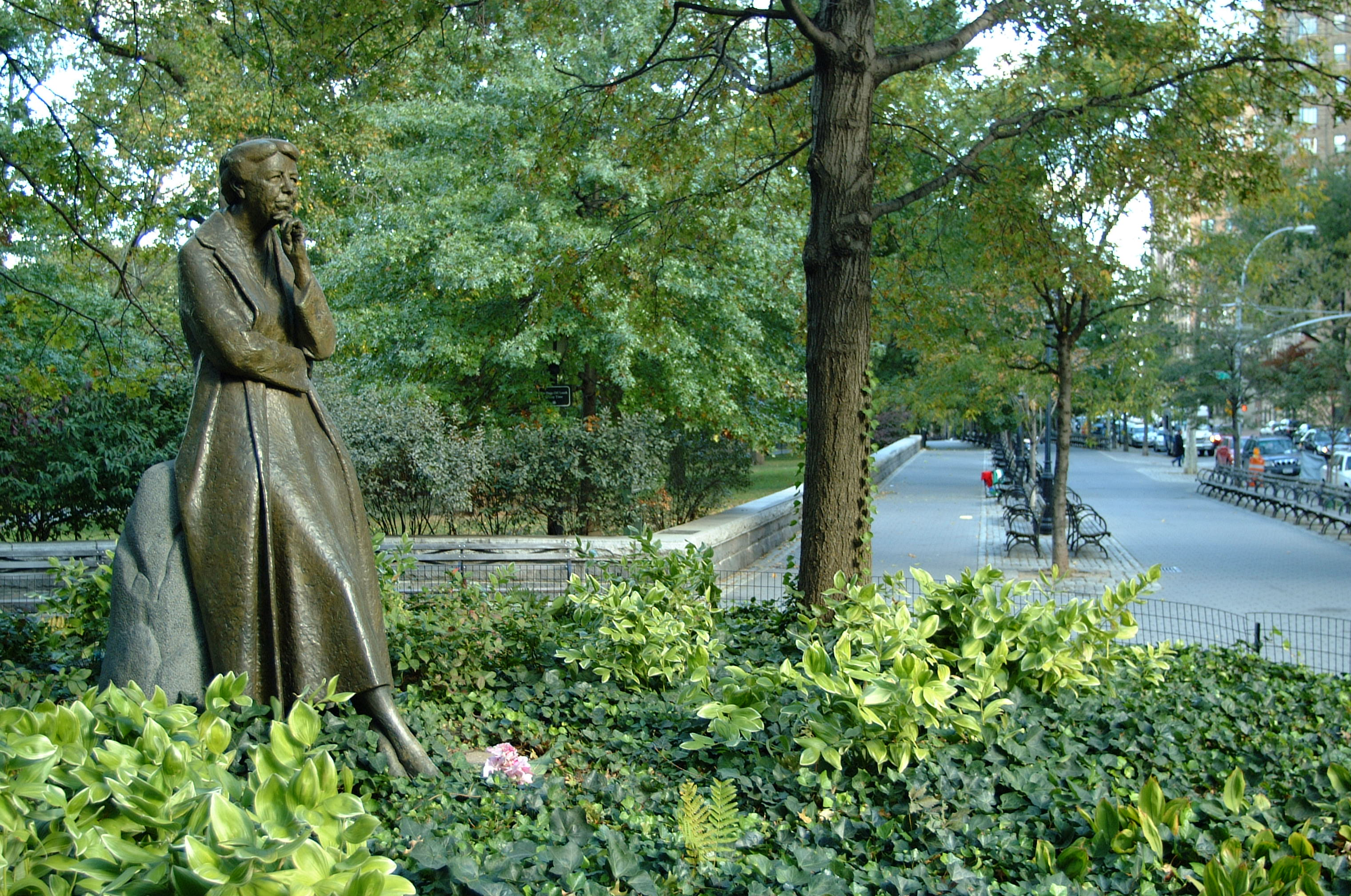
Riverside Drive's southern end at 72nd Street, looking north from the Eleanor Roosevelt Memorial Plaza

In 1865, Central Park commissioner William R. Martin put forth the first proposal for a riverside park along the Hudson River. An act providing for such was presented to the Legislature by commissioner Andrew Haswell Green in 1866 and approved the next year. The first segment of Riverside Park was acquired through condemnation in 1872. The park also included the construction of Riverside Drive, a tree-lined drive curving around the valleys and rock outcroppings, overlooking the future park and the waterfront. The road was originally known as Riverside Avenue, although the entire avenue was renamed Riverside Drive by the 1900s. The avenue was laid out in 1868 and was 100 feet (30 m) wide for its entire length. The plans for Riverside Park and Avenue brought the attention of William M. Tweed, who bought several lots adjacent to the park in anticipation of its construction.

A selection process for the designers of Riverside Park followed, and in 1873 the commissioners selected Frederick Law Olmsted, a park commissioner who had also designed Central Park. Initially, Riverside Drive had been planned to run in a straight line, which would have required a retaining wall and extensive fill. By then, the difficult topography of the area had come to the attention of the Manhattan park commissioners, and in 1873 Olmsted was given the authorization to redesign the grade of Riverside Drive. To accommodate this, Olmsted devised a new plan that would create a main road extending from 72nd to 123rd streets, with overpasses at 79th and 96th streets, as well as "carriage roads" to serve the nearby neighborhood. The grade of the road was not to exceed 1:27. Riverside Drive's main road would contain two roadways, one for each direction, separated by a median. A pedestrian path and a horse path would run alongside the avenue, and trees would provide shade along the route. A section of the avenue from 104th to 123rd Street would serve as a shaded promenade, and there would be a carriage turnaround at 123rd Street.

Over the following years, work proceeded on Riverside Drive, with various ramps and stairs to the park, as well as a bridle path (which was added in 1875). Olmsted was asked to create plans for the design of the avenue as an unpaved country drive, but it was eventually paved. In late 1876, bids were accepted for the paving of Riverside Drive. Olmsted was ousted as parks superintendent in December 1877. Architects and horticulturalists such as Calvert Vaux and Samuel Parsons laid out the stretch of park and road between 72nd and 125th streets according to the English gardening ideal, creating the appearance that the park was an extension of the Hudson River Valley. A parapet was built on the western side of the road, separating it from Riverside Park and the West Side Line.

==== Boulevard Lafayette ====
The northernmost section of Riverside Drive, north of 158th Street, was originally known as the Boulevard Lafayette. The southern terminus of the Boulevard Lafayette was near 155th Street; the road ran along the coast of the Hudson River, running north to the intersection of Broadway (then known as Kingsbridge Road) and Dyckman Street. Originally known simply as "The Boulevard", the road was renamed the Boulevard Lafayette in 1870; work on that road began in 1873. Although a right-of-way measuring 100 feet (30 m) wide was provided for the Boulevard Lafayette, the roadway itself was originally only 60 feet (18 m) wide. At several points, due to the steep topography, a retaining wall was built adjacent to the road.

=== Completion and early years ===
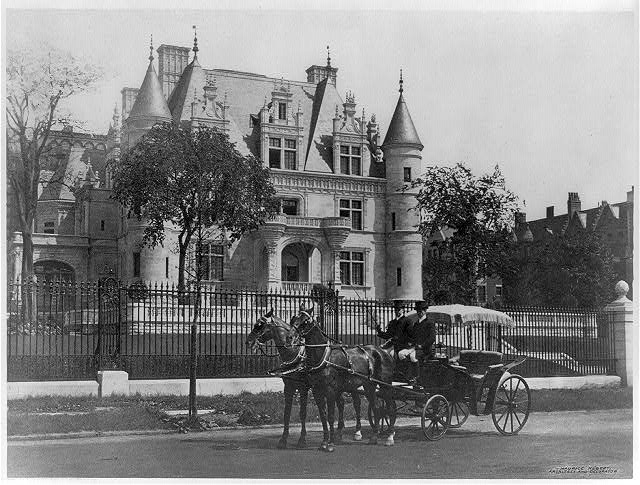
The Schwab Mansion, one of several built on Riverside Drive

Riverside Drive was opened in 1880 and was well used by pedestrians, bikers, and drivers; it had cost nearly $10 million. Riverside Drive originally terminated at 122nd Street, near where Grant's Tomb was later built. City parks workers had to use 125,000 U.S. gallons (470,000 L) of water every day to ensure that the avenue's bridle path was usable. The wealthy came to settle on Riverside Drive soon after its completion. The Phillips Elite Directory of 1882–1883 did not list any members of the social elite as living on the Avenue, but the 1887 version of the same directory listed 18 families as living on the avenue. The avenue largely attracted the nouveau riche, and relatively few mansions were ever built in Riverside Drive. The city's wealthiest residents continued to live on Fifth Avenue, while old money families tended to live further downtown. Charles M. Schwab, who built his mansion between 73rd and 74th streets, was one of the few extremely wealthy residents to relocate to the avenue.

One of the first mansions to be built on Riverside Drive was a house belonging to the engineer Egbert Ludovicus Viele, who moved to the intersection with 88th Street. This was followed by additional structures along both the avenue and the side streets. Mansions, middle-class row houses, and upscale apartments were built on Riverside Drive in the late 19th and early 20th century. By the end of the 19th century, nearly every lot on the eastern side of Riverside Drive had been developed with private mansions and apartment buildings. By comparison, there had been fewer than 10 houses between 72nd and 125th streets on the shoreline before construction of the avenue began. One publication described Riverside Drive as "one of the most beautiful and picturesque in the world", and The New York Times wrote that the avenue's mansions "glittered like a wedding cake" by the 1890s.

Tugboats along the Hudson River frequently made loud noises, prompting several Riverside Drive residents to create the Society for the Suppression of Unnecessary Noise in 1907. The effort ultimately led to federal legislation limiting noise from tugboats. In addition, until 1916, fumes from factories in North Jersey, across the Hudson River to the west, often drifted across to Riverside Drive.

=== Extensions ===
In January 1897, state lawmakers proposed extending Riverside Drive northward to the Boulevard Lafayette, with a viaduct above Manhattan Valley from 122nd to 134th Street. The original plans, which were to cost $10 million and included four viaducts, were quickly downsized to $2 million and one viaduct. Shortly afterward, a similar bill was proposed with a lower cost. The revised bill called for the avenue to be narrowed in the vicinity of Trinity Church Cemetery at 153rd Street. The governor of New York signed both bills in May 1897, but work on the viaduct was delayed for several months. That November, the city's Board of Street Opening and Improvement agreed to lengthen the viaduct slightly so that it ran from 122nd to 135th Street. The extension was budgeted at $3.6 million, with the viaduct alone costing $840,000. At 153rd Street, Riverside Drive would be cantilevered over the New York Central Railroad's (NYCRR) West Side Line railroad tracks to avoid Trinity Church Cemetery. The extension plans also involved demolishing several old mansions.

==== 96th Street overpass and Manhattan Valley Viaduct ====
The Manhattan Valley Viaduct under construction

The New York City Board of Estimate formally approved the Manhattan Valley Viaduct in December 1898, and plans for the viaduct were drawn up within three weeks. At the end of that month, the firm of O'Brien, Sheehan, and McBean was hired to build the viaduct for $570,000; under the terms of the contract, the viaduct had to be completed in 400 days. Work on the viaduct began in March 1898. The viaduct's engineers requested in June 1898 that the approaches be made of granite rather than sandstone, which would add $80,000 to the cost; the city's comptroller opposed the change. The next month, the city authorized $86,500 in bonds to finance an overpass above 96th Street and $500,000 in bonds for the Manhattan Valley Viaduct.

The city's park commissioners began soliciting bids for the 96th Street overpass in June 1900 and awarded a contract the next month to A. C. Gildersleeve for $200,000. Work on the 96th Street overpass began later the same year. Meanwhile, the abutments for the Manhattan Valley Viaduct were finished by mid-1900. The chief engineer of the city's highways departments reported in April 1901 that the Manhattan Valley Viaduct was completed except for filling and electrical work. Work on the 96th Street overpass was delayed for two months due to difficulties in installing sewage pipes; the overpass opened in January 1902 following complaints that the contractor was taking too long. The Manhattan Valley Viaduct was completed in mid-1902. The construction of the 96th Street overpass and Manhattan Valley Viaduct caused real-estate prices along Riverside Drive to increase in the 1900s. Arc lamps were installed on the Manhattan Valley Viaduct in 1903, soon after it opened.

==== Extension to 158th Street ====
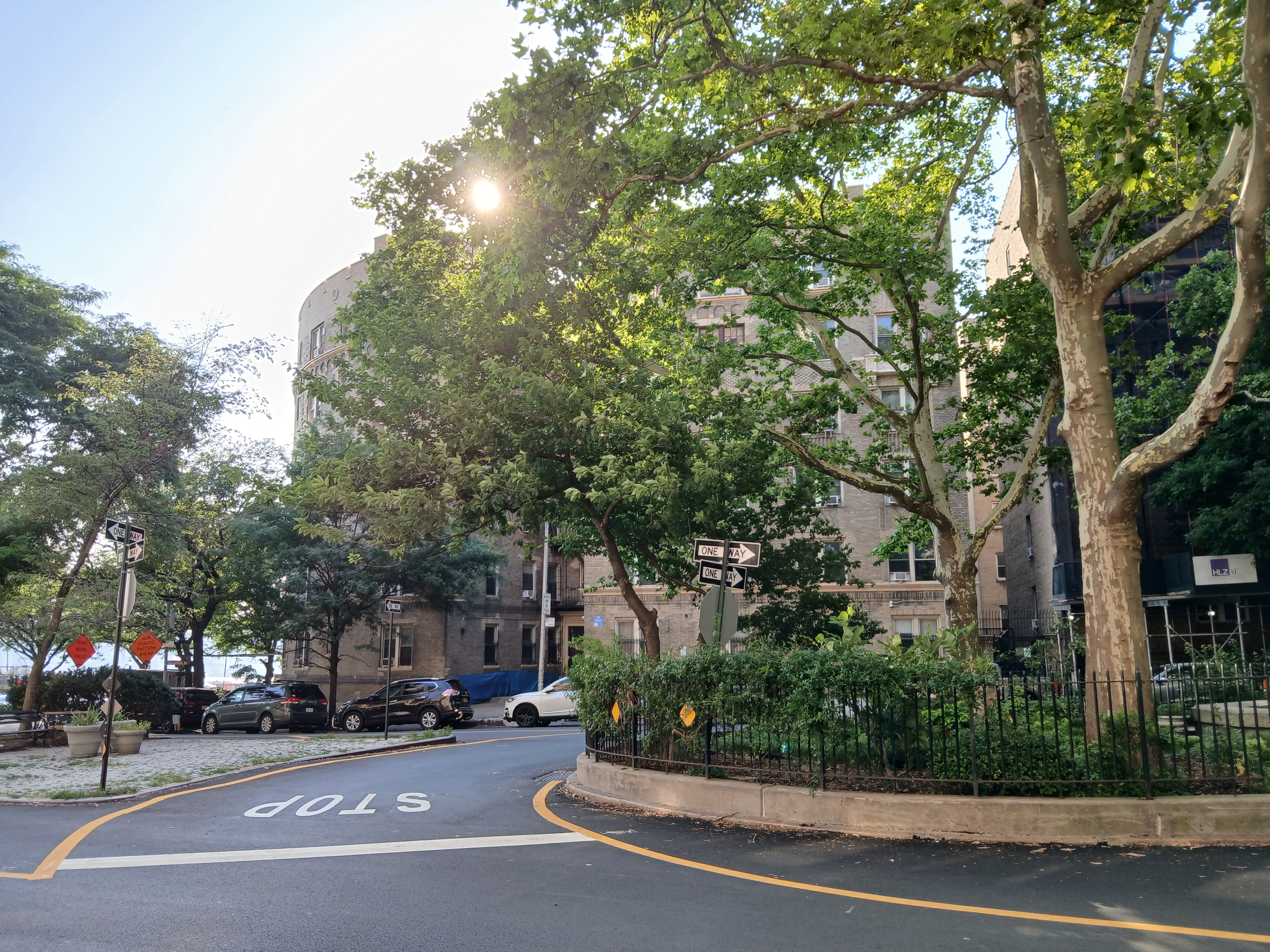
Median of Riverside Drive at 156th Street

The city's corporation council began condemning land for the extension of Riverside Drive north of the Manhattan Valley Viaduct in mid-1899, and three commissioners were appointed to condemn the land the next year. The city acquired the land in September 1900. Most of the condemned sites had been small plots, except for a tract between 142nd and 144th streets that had belonged to the Hoguet family. The project was split into two phases: section 1 between 135th and 153rd streets, and section 2 between 153rd Street and the Boulevard Lafayette (through the Audubon Park section of Washington Heights). By August 1901, plans for section 1 had been completed, with that section estimated to cost $1.7 million. The extension would consist of a 60-foot-wide (18 m) roadway, a 20-foot-wide (6.1 m) bridle path, two sidewalks, and grass planting strips. There were also to be four bridges carrying the avenue between 135th and 156th streets. Along with the Boulevard Lafayette (which already extended northwest from Broadway and 156th Street to the Inwood neighborhood), the Riverside Drive extension would form part of a 20-mile (32 km) parkway that would connect with Harlem River Drive. Construction did not start for over two years after the city acquired land for the Riverside Drive extension. In the meantime, dirt from the excavation of the city's first subway line was dumped on the path of the extension.

A state judge ruled in April 1903 that construction of the Riverside Drive extension had to start as soon as possible, and a groundbreaking ceremony for the extension occurred on December 12, 1903. The section from 135th to 145th Street was awarded to Ryan & Parker, while the section from 145th to 155th Street was awarded to John C. Rodgers; work on both sections began in May 1904. The section of Riverside Drive north of 150th Street was much higher than the streets that it intersected, prompting residents of these cross-streets to complain that their vehicles could not access Riverside Drive. The plans also included widening the Boulevard Lafayette within Audubon Park and constructing a service road to the east of the existing boulevard. Because people frequently referred to the Boulevard Lafayette by several incorrect names, residents of Washington Heights also wanted the Boulevard Lafayette to be renamed Riverside Drive.

The city planned to acquire land to widen the section of the Boulevard Lafayette (then renamed Riverside Drive) between 158th and 165th streets in 1907, but the city's controller objected to the $1 million valuation placed on the land. By mid-1908, Riverside Drive was complete to 155th Street, except for a single city block between 151st and 152nd streets, where a property owner had successfully requested that a state judge place an injunction on the project. A few blocks north, families with plots in Trinity Church Cemetery complained that the new road was obstructing views of the Hudson River from their plots. The extension of Riverside Drive resulted in the development of upper-class apartment houses there. To pay for the construction of the extension, the Riverside Drive and Parkway Commission proposed charging local residents $1.5 million, though the high cost was controversial. The section between 145th and 158th streets formally opened in February 1911. John C. Rodgers, who helped build the section from 145th to 158th streets, later sued the city for delaying the road's completion by four years; the suit was not resolved until 1930.

=== Early 20th century ===
==== Mid-1900s to 1910s ====
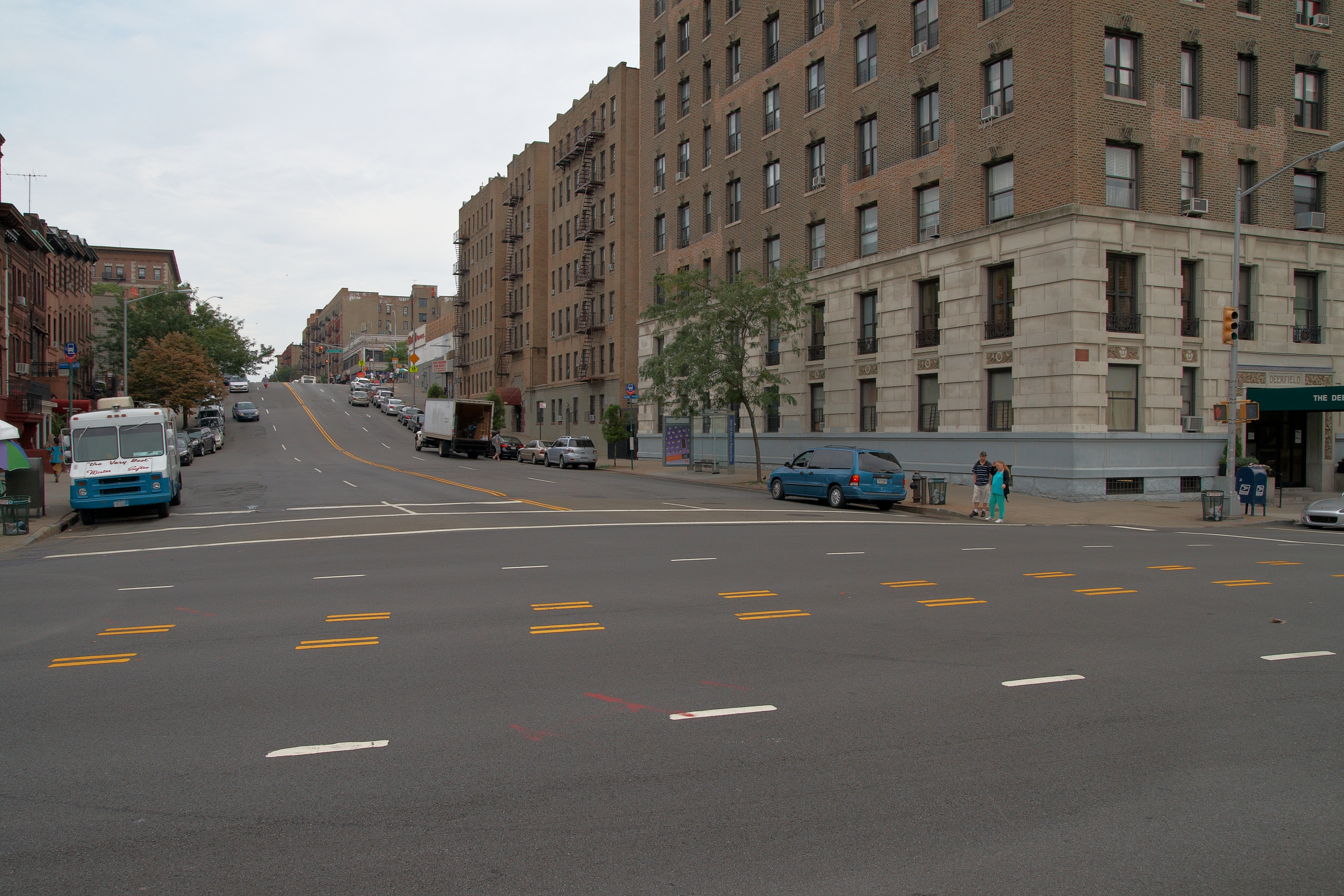
View down 145th Street at Riverside Drive

By the mid-1900s, engineers were considering extending Riverside Drive further north from 158th Street to the proposed Henry Hudson Bridge, as well as southeast from 72nd Street to West End Avenue. The New York Times estimated that the northward extension would cost $4.8 million, and the New-York Tribune estimated the total cost of Riverside Drive at $25.2 million. The Board of Estimate declined to fund a further extension of Riverside Drive in 1908, saying the city lacked money. John F. Ahearn, Manhattan's borough president, began requesting bids for the construction of Riverside Drive from 158th Street to Spuyten Duyvil, Bronx, in March 1909. Amid disagreements over the extension's cost, a state judge placed an injunction to prevent Ahearn from awarding contracts for the extension. After the city agreed to spend only $250,000 on the extension in 1909, the Board of Estimate began requesting bids that May for the construction of Riverside Drive between 158th and 181st streets. The Municipal Art Commission approved designs for the extension that July. Josiah A. Briggs, the chief engineer for the Bronx, proposed extending Riverside Drive all the way to Van Cortlandt Park in Riverdale, Bronx.

Due to high amounts of traffic over the years, the original road between 72nd and 125th streets had degraded extensively by the early 1910s. As such, in 1912, New York City park commissioner Charles B. Stover proposed replacing the pavement, and he sought $475,000 from the city government. Stover also wanted to build a highway around the northern tip of Manhattan, connecting the northern end of Riverside Drive with the Harlem River Speedway to the east. Olmsted and Arnold W. Brunner recommended in 1913 that Riverside Drive be extended north to the Bronx, with a new viaduct connecting 155th Street and the Boulevard Lafayette. Work north of 155th Street had not started. Workers began adding a permanent pavement to the avenue between 72nd and 110th streets in 1913, and upgrades to the section from 110th to 128th street began in 1915. After a pedestrian was killed near Grant's Tomb that year, the two-way roadways on either side of the monument were both converted to one-way traffic.

Meanwhile, after the opening of the city's first subway line, the northern section of Riverside Drive was quickly developed with six-to-twelve-story apartment blocks, in many cases replacing mansions and other lower-density development. Numerous multi-story apartment buildings had been developed along Riverside Drive on the Upper West Side by the early 1910s, and even more apartment buildings were built on the avenue after World War I. As early as the 1910s, there had been plans to bypass the curved extension of Riverside Drive through Audubon Park. By 1917, the city government had tentatively agreed to rebuild Riverside Park west of Riverside Drive. Local residents had opposed earlier proposals for the park, saying that noise and disruptions from the construction project would compel many Riverside Drive residents to relocate. In 1919, the city controller proposed extending Riverside Drive south to 57th Street by building a roadway above the West Side Line.

==== 1920s ====
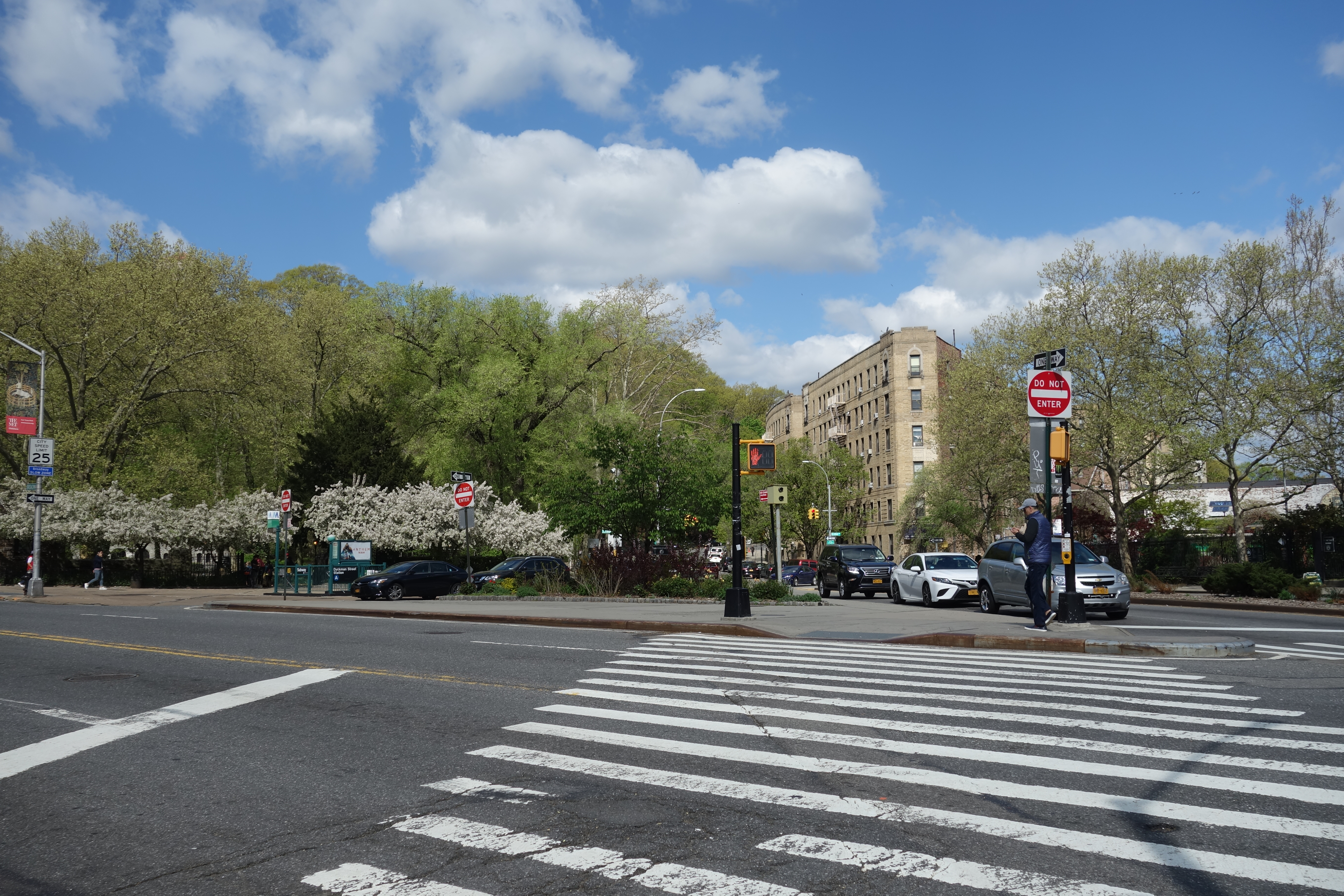
Riverside Drive's northern section at Dyckman Street

The roadway between 135th and 158th streets was replaced with a permanent pavement in 1920. The New York City Board of Estimate voted down a resolution in 1921 to build a parallel roadway to Riverside Drive between 155th and 175th streets, within Hamilton Heights, at a cost of $7 million. The next year, borough president Julius Miller submitted plans to build a road, known as Riverside Drive West, between 155th and 177th streets for $2.791 million; this would serve as a bypass of the existing roadway. The project would require the construction of several high retaining walls west of Riverside Drive West. In addition, the land east of Riverside Drive West between 155th and 161st streets, a hollow known as Garage Village, was to be raised. The city's proposal to widen Riverside Drive required the acquisition of land, including a portion of the Columbia University Irving Medical Center's site along the Hudson River. The city also acquired land in Inwood Hill Park for a further northward extension into the Bronx, and there were suggestions to extend the road to Westchester County, New York, or the city of Troy.

The section of Riverside Drive between 165th and Dyckman streets was renovated for $1.25 million starting in 1924, and the road reopened in May 1925. Workers installed new plantings and repaved the road. The roadway was also widened by 18 feet (5.5 m), requiring the construction of retaining walls as much as 150 feet (46 m) tall, and a wide sidewalk was built on the western side of the avenue, facing the river. Near 190th Street, a scenic overlook was built at Inspiration Point, where Riverside Drive curved outward toward the river. The Municipal Art Commission approved the construction of Riverside Drive West in 1926, and workers began constructing foundations for the viaduct the same year. The city began requesting bids from steel contractors in April 1927, and the P. T. Cox Construction Co. was hired to provide 5,000 short tons (4,500 long tons; 4,500 t) of structural steel for the viaduct. Later that year, a state judge determined that it would cost $3.3 million to acquire land for a northward extension of Riverside Drive. The viaduct was opened on November 28, 1928, having cost $2.36 million.

Other improvements along Riverside Drive were also undertaken in the 1920s. For instance, city controller Charles L. Craig wanted the Board of Estimate to build a parallel roadway above the West Side Line, and one local organization requested that the avenue's sparsely used bridle path be converted into a children's play area. The Manhattan Valley Viaduct was closed for repairs in 1923. In addition, to increase traffic flow on Riverside Drive, the city government retimed some traffic lights in 1928, allowing motorists to pass through several green lights at once. Near the northern end of the avenue, there were proposals for ramps to and from the then-new George Washington Bridge; these ramps opened along with the bridge in 1931. Many luxury apartments continued to be developed on Riverside Drive in the 1920s and 1930s; however, upper-class residents were also starting to move away, and lower- and middle-class renters began to move in.

=== Mid-20th century ===
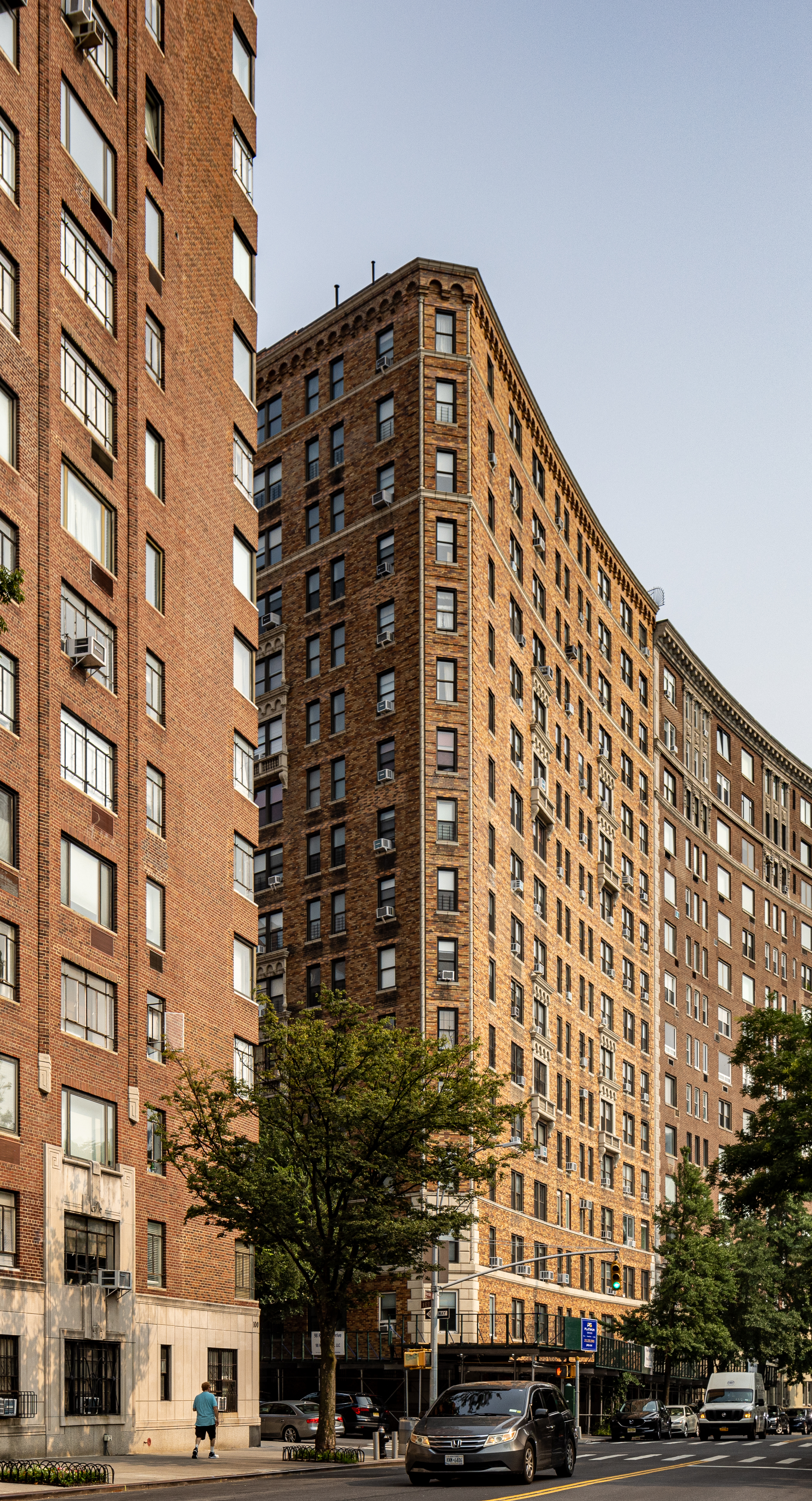
Building at Riverside Drive and 82nd Street

During the mid-20th century, many of the apartment buildings on Riverside Drive started to deteriorate and were changed to single-room occupancy structures. White residents moved out of these buildings, and black and Hispanic residents moved in. The road was also frequently used as an alternate route to the Henry Hudson Parkway after that highway was completed.

==== 1930s and West Side Improvement ====
As part of a pilot program in 1930, the city government retimed the traffic signal at the intersection of 120th Street and Riverside Drive, adding a pedestrian clearance interval; at the time, most of the city's traffic lights had no pedestrian clearance intervals. Also in 1930, a northward extension of Riverside Drive was again proposed in conjunction with the proposed Henry Hudson Bridge. The next year, workers began replacing the Manhattan Valley Viaduct's wood-block pavement, which was starting to deteriorate. The northern section of the West Side Elevated Highway, connecting to Riverside Drive's southern terminus, opened in 1932; this provided a link from Riverside Drive to the Holland Tunnel, which led to New Jersey. As part of the concurrent West Side Improvement project, the West Side railroad line was relocated into the Freedom Tunnel north of 72nd Street. The Henry Hudson Parkway was also constructed as part of the West Side Improvement, and Riverside Park was greatly expanded as well.

In March 1934, the New York State Legislature approved a northward extension of Riverside Drive from Dyckman Street to the Bronx; this extension was to be developed as part of the Henry Hudson Parkway. Work on the extension began in February 1935; the project was funded by a $3.1 million bond issue. The city government also submitted plans in mid-1936 for a $7 million upgrade to the existing section of Riverside Drive between St. Clair Place (at the southern end of the Manhattan Valley Viaduct) and Dyckman Street. The portion of the parkway north of Dyckman Street opened in December 1936, and the portion south of the George Washington Bridge opened the next year, relieving traffic on much of Riverside Drive. The section of Riverside Drive between the George Washington Bridge and Dyckman Street was incorporated into the northbound roadway of Henry Hudson Parkway. A parallel southbound roadway for the Henry Hudson Parkway was built between these two points. When it opened in January 1938, the section of Riverside Drive between these two points was converted to a northbound-only road.

Other changes along Riverside Drive took place during the 1930s. The city's police commissioner began allowing motorists to turn left on red at several intersections along Riverside Drive in 1937. In addition, concrete curbs were installed along the Manhattan Valley Viaduct in the late 1930s to reduce the probability of motorists falling off the viaduct. By this decade, the architect Henry Wright had claimed that the buildings around Riverside Drive were "slums or potential slums", a claim that many local residents and architects denied. Conversely, the developer Charles V. Paterno predicted that the avenue would again become an upscale residential corridor because of its location and the construction of the Henry Hudson Parkway and George Washington Bridge. Many row houses on Riverside Drive had been replaced with apartments by the 1930s.

==== 1940s and 1950s ====
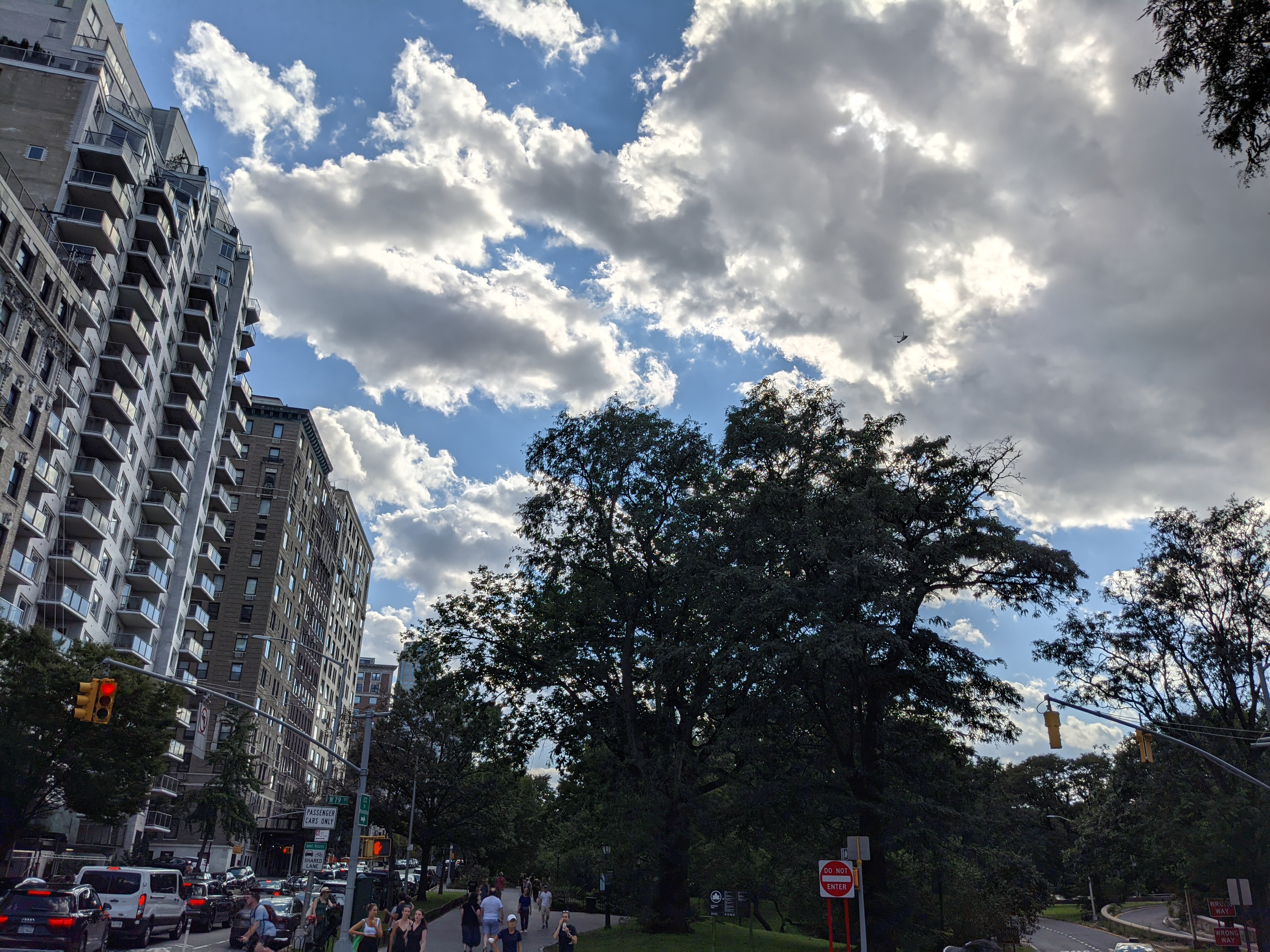
View down Riverside Drive at 79th Street

Manhattan borough president Hugo Rogers claimed in the 1940s that some of the Manhattan Valley Viaduct's steel plates needed to be replaced. The section of Riverside Drive from 72nd to 79th streets was temporarily converted into a northbound-only road in 1951, and parking between 72nd and 96th streets was restricted, due to repairs on the Henry Hudson Parkway. In addition, to eliminate a longstanding bottleneck along Riverside Drive near the George Washington Bridge, a ramp from the bridge to the Henry Hudson Parkway opened in 1953. An alternate-side parking rule was implemented on the avenue in 1956; in conjunction with this change, 119 bus stops on Riverside Drive were relocated as well. Although alternate-side parking had already been implemented on other nearby streets, Riverside Drive was maintained by the New York City Department of Parks and Recreation, rather than the New York City Department of Sanitation, and had been exempt from the rule.

The city government began reconstructing the viaduct from 153rd to 155th streets in March 1959; the project involved increasing the roadway's width from 45 to 59 feet (14 to 18 m), replacing the steel frame, and constructing new sidewalks. Reconstruction was supposed to have been completed in September 1959, but the viaduct did not reopen until that December. The same year, the city government began studying plans to improve lighting along the avenue. Also starting in 1959, the Manhattan Valley Viaduct was renovated at a cost of $1.4 million; workers added new roadways, replaced one-third of the viaduct, and added aluminum netting to discourage birds from nesting there. The viaduct was rededicated in April 1961 after the renovation was completed.

==== 1960s and 1970s ====
When the George Washington Bridge's lower level opened in 1962, the New York City Department of Transportation (DOT) considered retiming the avenue's traffic lights to allow for smoother traffic flow. A progressive-traffic-signal system was implemented in October 1962. During the morning, the traffic lights were timed for southbound traffic, while during the evening, the traffic lights were timed for northbound traffic. The DOT also added radar antennas to traffic lights along the avenue, which collected data for a computerized traffic-signal control system. In 1964, the DOT implemented no-standing rules on Riverside Drive north of 154th Street during the mornings, and it began using a radio system to control the traffic lights between 72nd and 154th streets. The changes were meant to increase traffic capacity, but local residents opposed these changes, claiming that it would make Riverside Drive more congested. In addition, Riverside Drive was designated as part of a citywide bike route in 1968.

The city announced plans in 1967 to construct a sewage tunnel under Riverside Drive, which would divert sewage away from the Hudson River. City workers began excavating shafts for the tunnel in 1970, which required the construction of temporary footpaths, but local residents protested the project because it was too noisy. In response, the city government froze several tons of wet soil to reduce construction noise near the tunnel shafts. There were also proposals in the early 1970s to convert Riverside Drive to a one-way street during weekday rush hours, carrying southbound traffic in the morning and northbound traffic in the afternoon.

When a section of the Henry Hudson Parkway was entirely closed for repairs in January 1974, drivers were detoured onto Riverside Drive, and a no-parking restriction was enacted between 72nd and 79th streets. These restrictions, and the increases in traffic on the avenue, prompted several residents to form an organization to protest congestion on Riverside Drive. In response, the adjacent section of Henry Hudson Parkway was partly reopened as a reversible lane in September 1974, but this failed to decrease congestion on Riverside Drive. In addition, double-decker buses began running on the M5 route along Riverside Drive in 1976, requiring the relocation of several traffic lights and wires, as well as the removal of tree limbs. By the 1970s, Riverside Drive was still occupied by middle-class residents, but there was frequent crime on the side streets due to the avenue's relatively isolated location.

=== Late 20th century ===
==== 1980s and 1990s changes ====
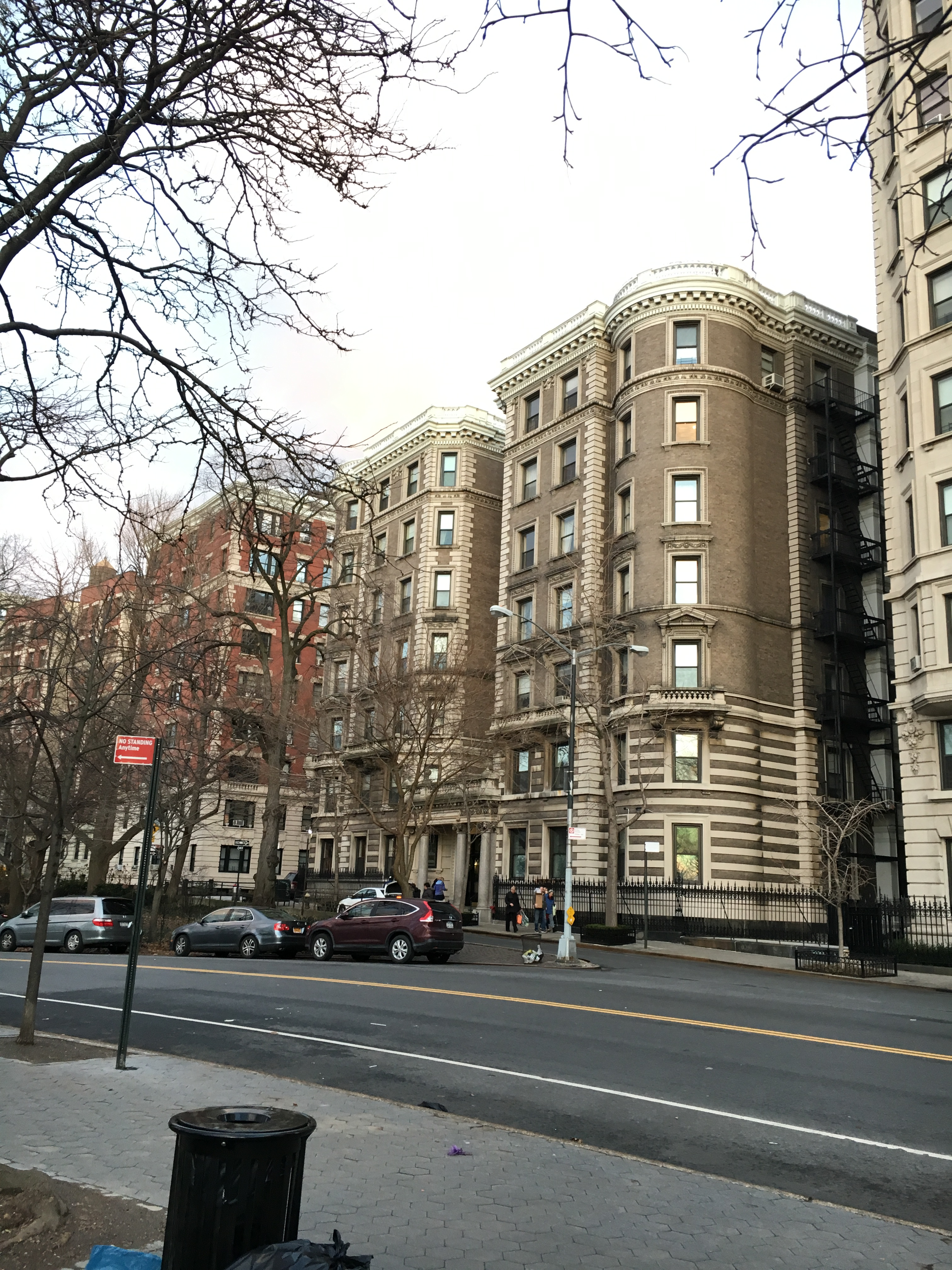
194 and 200 Riverside Drive

In February 1980, the New York City Landmarks Preservation Commission designated the portion of Riverside Park and Drive south of 125th Street as a New York City scenic landmark. Another renovation project for the Manhattan Valley Viaduct was scheduled in 1981, at which point the project was to cost $27 million. By then, a DOT official had rated the viaduct as severely deteriorated, and trucks and buses were banned from the viaduct due to the poor conditions. Funding for repairs to the Manhattan Valley Viaduct and the 155th–161st streets viaduct were included in a $1.25 billion bond issue that was proposed in 1983, and New York state voters approved the bond issue that November. The same year, workers began replacing some of the viaduct's floor beams for $250,000. The Manhattan Valley Viaduct closed for renovations in 1984, and it reopened that November following emergency repairs.

The New York State Department of Transportation closed the Manhattan Valley Viaduct again in May 1985 for emergency repairs. The deck had corroded significantly, prompting officials to spend another $9.5 million replacing girders. That December, city officials announced that they would spend $26 million rebuilding the Manhattan Valley Viaduct and partially reopening it. The project involved replacing most of the viaduct's superstructure, in addition to replacing the existing deck with a lightweight concrete deck. The Manhattan Valley Viaduct fully reopened in July 1987, having cost $36 million in total to renovate. Further north, portions of Riverside Drive in Hamilton Heights collapsed in 1986 following a water main break, and the section of Riverside Drive in Hamilton Heights was partially closed for repairs. In addition, when a condominium building was completed at 222 Riverside Drive in 1988, it was the first apartment building to be erected on the avenue in 35 years.

In 1991, the city government proposed rebuilding the section of the avenue north of 135th Street. Local residents initially opposed the project because it would require the removal of trees in the median, so the DOT decided instead to retain all but eight of the trees. Work began in 1992. The sidewalks from 135th to 153rd streets were also rebuilt to comply with the Americans with Disabilities Act of 1990 (ADA); at the time, some of the sidewalks had a slope of 6%, three times the maximum slope allowed under the ADA. As a result, 20 buildings along the street had to build stairways to their entrances, and Manhattan Community Board 9 requested that the LPC protect the northern portion of the street. In the late 1990s, local groups restored two traffic islands on Riverside Drive, and the DOT hired a contractor to restore the viaduct in Hamilton Heights. By then, the values of apartments on the southern portion of Riverside Drive had increased significantly compared with earlier in the decade.

==== Riverside Boulevard ====
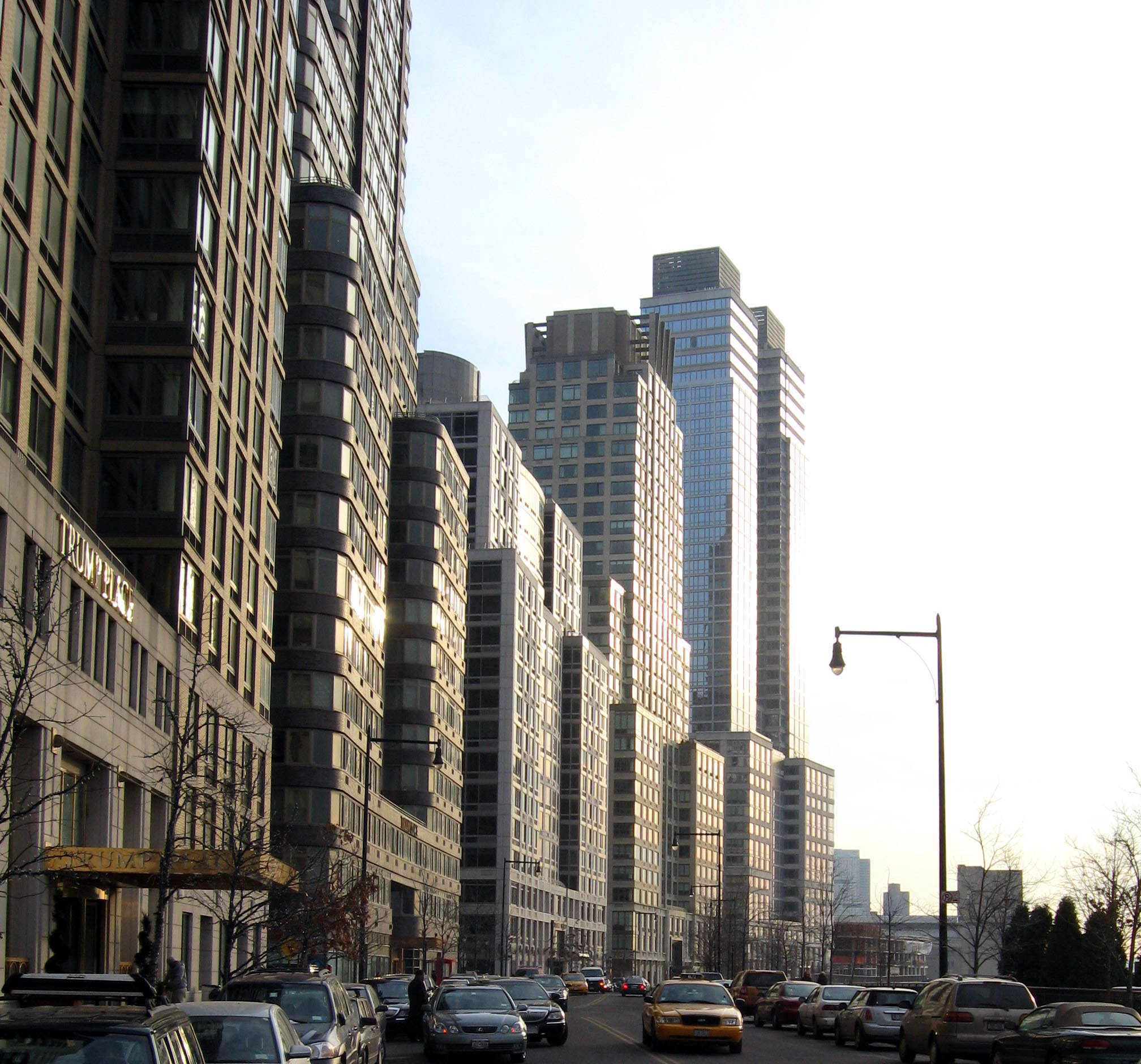
Riverside Boulevard looking south from 69th Street

In the 1980s, the developer Donald Trump, who owned 57 acres (230,000 m^{2}) of a Penn Central freight rail yard south of Riverside Park, proposed a large real estate development project on that site. Following financial difficulties and opposition from local civic groups, Trump announced a modified plan in 1991. Under the agreed-upon plan, Trump would expand Riverside Park by 23 acres (93,000 m^{2}) and construct a southern extension of Riverside Drive as far south as 59th Street. Paul Willen, who had led one of the civic groups that opposed the original plan, had suggested extending Riverside Drive "to make such an abandoned lump of a place feel like New York again". The extension would also relieve traffic congestion on West End Avenue one block east.

Trump's plans for the southern extension of Riverside Drive called for the avenue to run down the middle of the development. The 1991 plan also called for office and apartment buildings on the newly extended avenue, similar in height to the existing buildings on Riverside Drive, although these buildings were later increased in size. The boulevard would run above a relocated West Side Highway, functioning as a service road to that expressway; the proposal to relocate the West Side Highway was deferred due to political opposition. The approved plans called for Riverside Drive's extension to be built atop a viaduct, but in October 1997, several civic groups sued Trump after he reneged on the viaduct plans. By 1999, the Riverside Drive extension was known as Riverside Boulevard. Due to a lack of available space, Riverside Boulevard and Riverside Drive are not directly linked; they are instead connected by a short section of 72nd Street.

By 2003, Riverside Boulevard ran from 66th to 72nd streets. The northbound lanes of the West Side Highway from 59th to 72nd streets were still planned to be relocated into a tunnel under Riverside Boulevard. In June 2006, Riverside South's developer began construction of the northbound tunnel. The first phase of the tunnel measured 45 feet (14 m) wide and 250 feet (76 m) long and was 30 feet (9.1 m) above sea level. The rest of the tunnel remains incomplete. The connection between Riverside Drive's southern terminus and Riverside Boulevard remained closed until November 2011.

=== Early 21st century ===
Upper-class residents were beginning to move back to Riverside Drive by the first decade of the 21st century. In 2005, the retaining wall of Castle Village collapsed onto the northern section of Riverside Drive and the northbound lanes of the Henry Hudson Parkway. Part of Riverside Drive had to be closed while the wall was repaired. The wall was repaired and the roadway reopened in March 2008.

By the 2010s, the intersection of Riverside Drive and 79th Street was among the most dangerous on the Upper West Side, prompting Manhattan Community Board 7 to request that the intersection be redesigned. The DOT proposed narrowing Riverside Drive to one lane in each direction from 116th to 135th streets in early 2015, but this was changed to two northbound and one southbound lanes following opposition from local residents. As part of a related project the same year, speed limits from 103rd to 165th streets were reduced from 30 to 25 miles per hour (48 to 40 km/h); the section of Riverside Drive south of 103rd Street was already restricted to 25 miles per hour. The city government awarded a $102 million construction contract in 2018 to Judlau Contracting for the restoration of the viaduct near 155th Street, though the project was delayed when Judlau resigned in 2024. To increase safety, in 2020 the DOT reduced the speed limit on Riverside Drive between 165th and 181st streets from 30 to 25 miles per hour (48 to 40 km/h).

== Structures ==
Between 72nd and 125th streets, nearly every block of Riverside Drive is part of a New York City historic district, and the buildings on these blocks date from before World War II. These include the West End-Collegiate Historic District between 72nd and 79th streets; the Riverside Drive–West 80th–81st Streets Historic District between 80th and 81st streets; (Note: Including four buildings south of 80th Street, and the block from 80th to 81st Street. However, the north side of 79th Street is not part of any historic district.) the Riverside-West End Historic District between 81st and 108th streets; (Note: Except for the building just south of 96th Street, which is not part of any historic district, and the block from 105th to 106th streets, which is part of the Riverside–West 105th Street Historic District.) the Riverside–West 105th Street Historic District between 105th and 106th streets; and the Morningside Heights Historic District between 108th and 119th streets.

The buildings on Riverside Drive are mainly residential structures south of 165th Street, and there are very few stores on Riverside Drive. In 1927, one of the avenue's only businesses at the time was shuttered after residents of Riverside Drive spoke in favor of keeping the avenue a "strictly residential zone". In addition, zoning regulations prohibited garage entrances from being built onto Riverside Drive in the mid-20th century, and all buildings on the avenue had to include progressively deeper setbacks above a height of 125 or 150 feet (38 or 46 m).

=== Residential buildings ===
==== Mansions and row houses ====
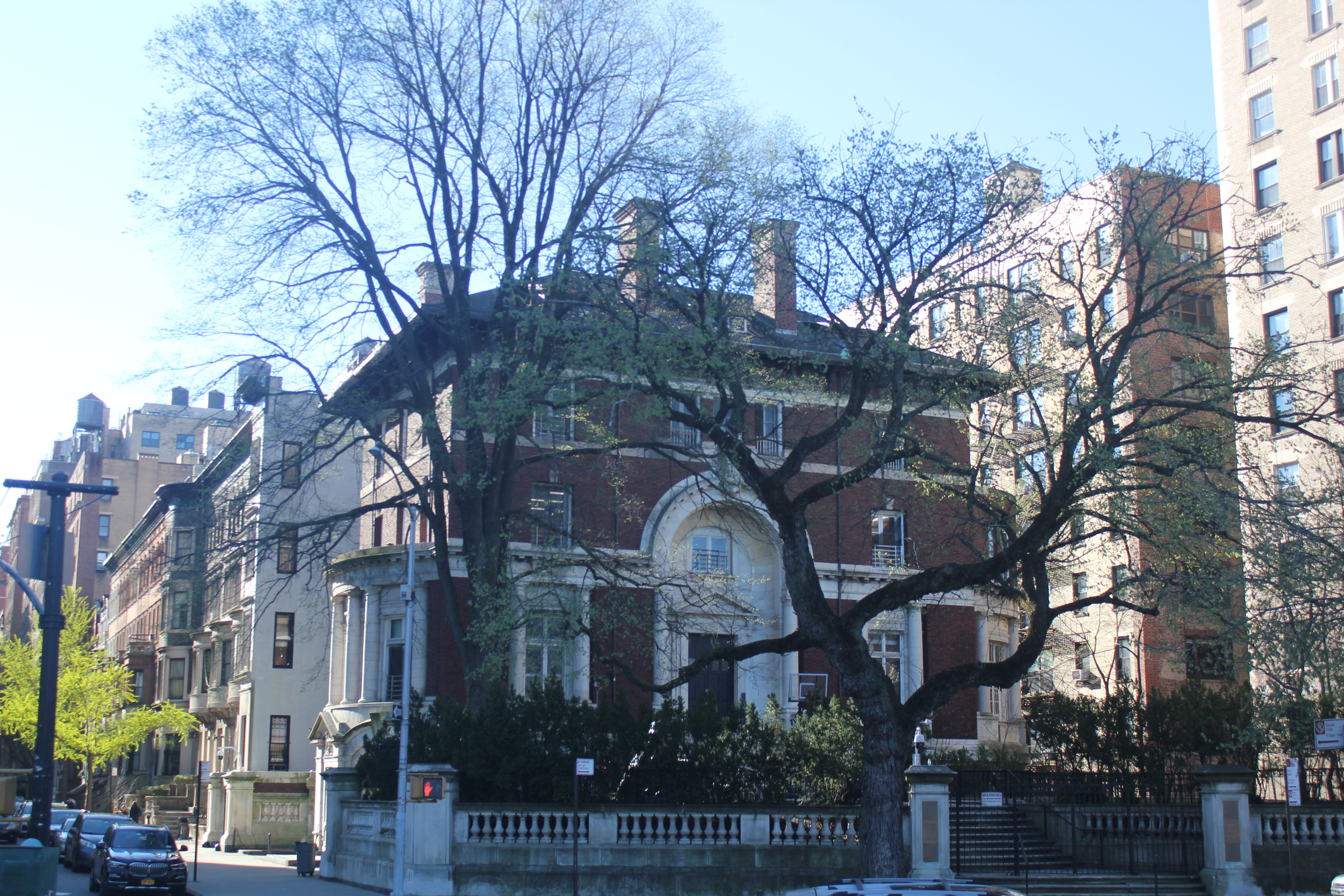
The Isaac L. Rice Mansion at 89th Street

At the end of the 19th century, the eastern side of Riverside Drive was lined with luxuriously finished rowhouses interspersed with free-standing mansions set in large lawns. Several freestanding mansions were built along Riverside Drive in the late 19th and early 20th centuries, at a time when developers envisioned Riverside Drive as a rival to the millionaires' row on Fifth Avenue. The Isaac L. Rice Mansion at 89th Street, and the Schinasi Mansion at 107th Street, are the only remaining freestanding mansions on Riverside Drive. The Charles M. Schwab House, built in 1905 for steel magnate Charles M. Schwab on a full city block between 73rd and 74th streets, was replaced in 1950 by the 18-story Schwab House apartment building.

Riverside Drive includes several notable row houses as well, which were generally occupied by the middle class, though comparatively few townhouses remain standing. Near 72nd Street, the Prentiss residence at 1 Riverside Drive and the Kleeberg residence at 3 Riverside Drive (both New York City designated landmarks) were developed in the late 1890s as part of a group of four ornate row houses. There are several rowhouses with stepped gables in the Riverside Drive–West 80th–81st Streets Historic District at 74–78 Riverside Drive, a relative rarity on the avenue, where most row houses were designed in the Beaux-Arts style. At 83rd Street is a set of houses designed by Clarence True in 1899, which are all designated as city landmarks. The same architect designed other houses along the avenue between 72nd and 84th streets, including a set of houses on 80th and 81st streets that he designed along with Charles H. Israel. The Baumgarten House at 294 Riverside Drive, designed in 1901 by Schickel & Ditmars, is also a city landmark. The block between 105th and 106th streets contains the Beaux-Arts–styled Davis Mansion at 330 Riverside Drive, part of the Riverside–West 105th Street Historic District's "Seven Beauties" at 330–337 Riverside Drive. Between 107th and 108th streets are 352 and 353 Riverside Drive, a pair of rowhouses on the National Register of Historic Places.

==== Apartment buildings ====
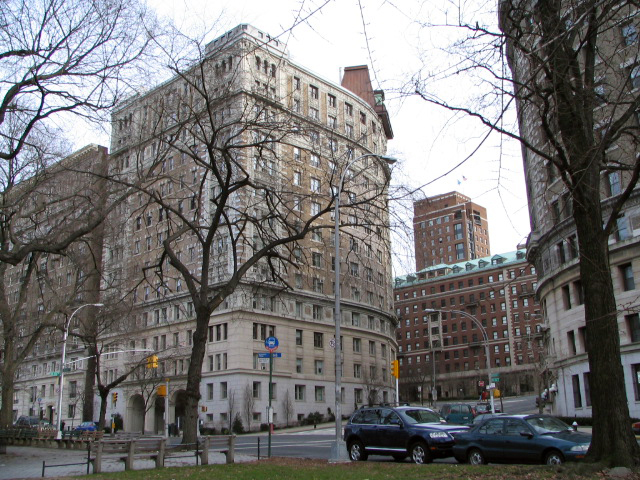
Curved facades of The Colosseum and The Paterno at 116th Street

Many of Riverside Drive's apartment buildings date from between the 1900s and the 1930s, with curving facades along the avenue. The southern portion of Riverside Drive is lined with many Art Deco, Beaux-Arts, and Renaissance Revival apartment buildings, mostly housing cooperatives; in particular, the section south of 96th Street is primarily occupied by luxury co-ops. The structures on the northern portion of Riverside Drive are designed in more modest styles, and there are more rental apartments. On both sections of Riverside Drive, some buildings are condominiums.

Multiple apartment houses along Riverside Drive are designated as individual city landmarks. These include the Normandy, an Art Moderne and Renaissance Revival apartment house between 86th and 87th streets, and the Master Apartments, a 27-story Art Deco tower at 310 Riverside Drive. At 150th Street is the Beaumont Apartments, an 11-story structure at 730 Riverside Drive built in 1913.

Riverside Drive has other notable apartment structures. The Clarendon at 137 Riverside Drive, just south of 86th Street, has a mansard roof with a five-story penthouse apartment. At 243 Riverside Drive near 96th Street is the Cliff Dwelling, a former apartment hotel, while the 370 Riverside Drive building was completed in 1923 by Simon Schwartz and Arthur Gross, at 109th Street. There are several major apartment houses on Riverside Drive in Morningside Heights. These include The Colosseum and The Paterno, a pair of structures at 116th Street with facades curving in opposite directions, and International House, a 13-story apartment structure erected in 1924 at 500 Riverside Drive near 123rd Street. The Castle Village apartment complex is on the former section of Riverside Drive (now Henry Hudson Parkway) between 182nd and 186th streets. South of 72nd Street, there are tall apartment buildings along Riverside Boulevard's eastern sidewalk.

=== Monuments ===
There are several monuments along Riverside Drive, many of which are in Riverside Park. At 89th Street is the Soldiers' and Sailors' Monument, which was erected in 1902 and commemorates Union Army soldiers; it is designated as a city landmark. In the center of Riverside Drive at 122nd Street is Grant's Tomb, the final resting place of U.S. President Ulysses S. Grant and his wife Julia. Grant's Tomb, a 150-foot-tall (46 m) domed structure made of white granite, is designated both as a national memorial and a city landmark.

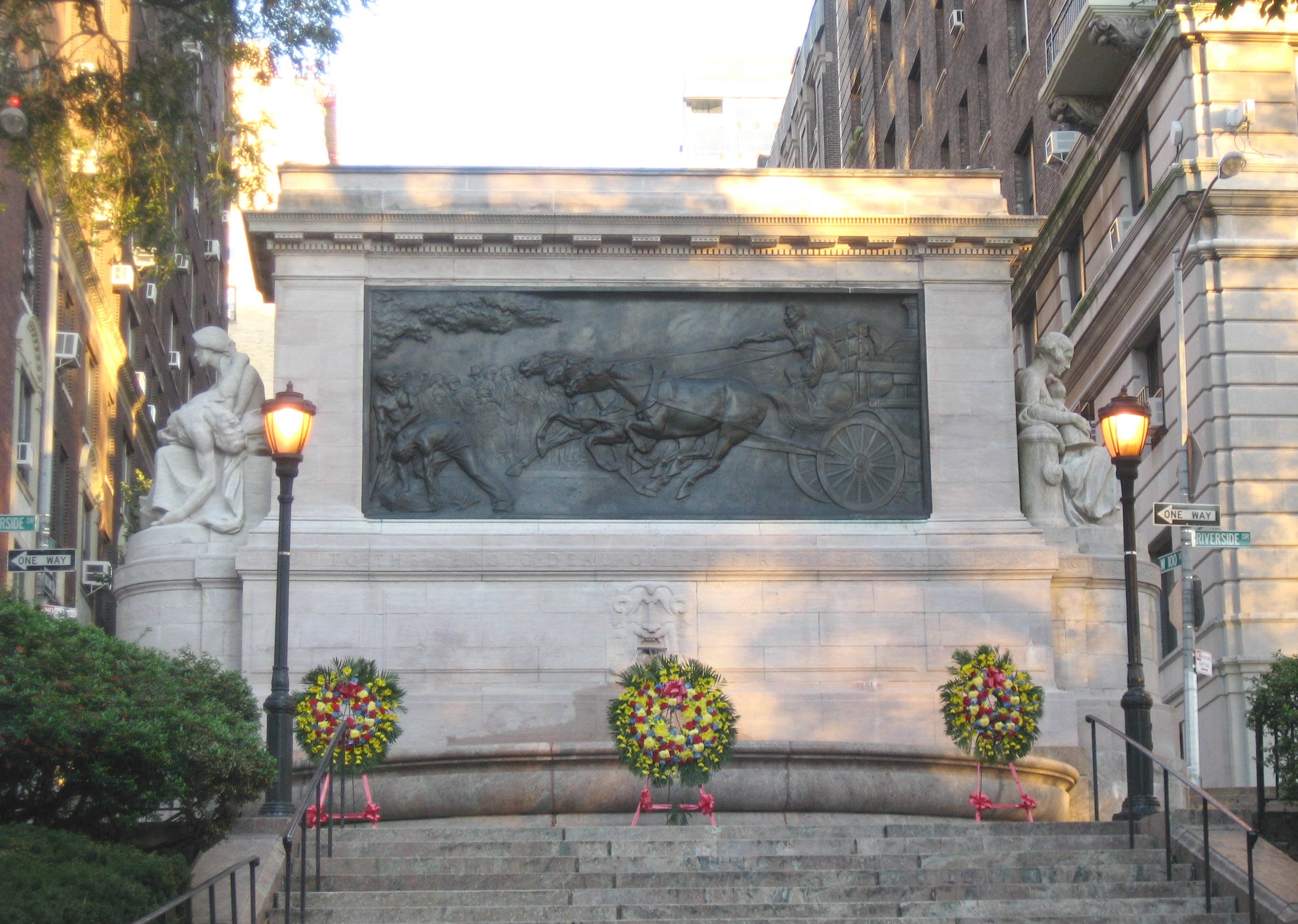
Firemen's Memorial at 100th Street

Numerous small monuments and memorials are clustered around Riverside Drive south of 122nd Street. Among the smaller monuments along its route are the Eleanor Roosevelt Monument at 72nd Street, Anna Hyatt Huntington's Joan of Arc at 93rd Street, a monument to John Merven Carrère by Thomas Hastings at 99th Street, Attilio Piccirilli's Fireman's Memorial at 100th Street, William Ordway Partridge's monument to Samuel J. Tilden at 112th Street, and the Amiable Child Monument at 122nd Street. A memorial to the novelist Ralph Ellison, by sculptor Elizabeth Catlett, was dedicated in 2003 in front of his longtime home at 730 Riverside Drive (near 150th Street).

=== Other structures ===
The Nicholas Roerich Museum is on 107th Street and Riverside Drive, while a 19-story office building, the Interchurch Center, is at 475 Riverside Drive on the southeast corner with 120th Street. Across from the Interchurch Center, between 120th and 122nd streets, is Riverside Church, a Gothic Revival church building with elements inspired by the Chartres Cathedral. Just north of Riverside Church is Sakura Park. St. Walburga's Academy is located between 140th and 141st streets, and Riverbank State Park is at 679 Riverside Drive near 145th Street. The Trinity Church Cemetery is located on the eastern side of Riverside Drive between 153rd and 155th streets, while the block to the north, between 155th and 156th streets, contains the Audubon Terrace cultural complex.

Near the northern end of Riverside Drive is Columbia-Presbyterian Medical Center. The original campus was built in 1925 on a cliff overlooking the avenue, while an annex was built across Riverside Drive to the west in 1999, connected to the original campus by pedestrian bridges. In addition, Fort Washington Park is located just west of the avenue's northernmost portion.

== Notable residents ==
Notable people who have lived on Riverside Drive over the years have included:

- Marian Anderson, contralto; lived at 730 Riverside Drive.
- Hannah Arendt, political theorist; lived at 370 Riverside Drive from 1959 until her death in 1975.
- Samantha Bee, talk show host
- Saul Bellow, author; lived at 333 Riverside Drive in the 1950s
- Major Bowes, radio personality; lived at 90 Riverside Drive
- Rafael Díez de la Cortina y Olaeta, linguist; resident of 431 Riverside Drive
- Ralph Ellison, writer; resident of 730 Riverside Drive
- Alfred T. Fellheimer, lead architect for Grand Central Terminal and Cincinnati Union Terminal; lived at 730 Riverside Drive
- George Gershwin, composer and pianist; occupied a penthouse at 33 Riverside Drive
- Ira Gershwin, lyricist; occupied a penthouse at 33 Riverside Drive, adjoining his brother's apartment
- Katie Halper, comedian and writer
- William Randolph Hearst, newspaper publisher; owned a five-story penthouse at 137 Riverside Drive
- John and Faith Hubley lived together and operated their Academy Award-winning independent animation studio from their apartment at 110 Riverside Drive.
- Jacob K. Javits, United States Senator from New York from 1957 to 1981; lived at 730 Riverside Drive
- Uwe Johnson, German author
- Paul Krugman, Nobel Prize in economics winner
- J. Robert Oppenheimer, Frank Oppenheimer and their parents lived at 155 Riverside Drive on 88th Street.
- Sergei Rachmaninoff owned a townhouse at 33 Riverside Drive, the predecessor to the present apartment block
- Grantland Rice, American sportswriter
- Jim Rogers, investor and financial commentator
- Damon Runyon, American newspaper man and author
- Babe Ruth, baseball player; lived at 173 Riverside Drive, then 110 Riverside Drive
- Amy Schneider, writer
- Thomas Sowell, American economist and social theorist, lived on the ground floor of a building on 152nd Street and Riverside Drive in the early 1950s
- William Vogt, scientist, lived and died 1968 at 140 Riverside Drive.
- Bolesław Wieniawa-Długoszowski, Polish diplomat; lived at 3 Riverside Drive and fell from his death there in 1942
- Peter Winston, chess player; lived with his family on Riverside Drive

== Impact ==
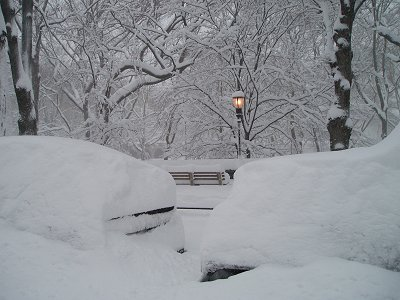
The western side of Riverside Drive under record snowfall in the blizzard of February 2006

In 1900, the New-York Tribune described the Manhattan Valley Viaduct as "another attractive feature [on] the already impressively beautiful east bank of the Hudson River at Riverside Park and Washington Heights". A writer for the New York Herald Tribune described Riverside Drive as being, in its early years, "really an elongated park" lined with mansions and apartments. Paul Goldberger, writing for The New York Times in 1980, said that "by any reasonable standard, Riverside Drive would be considered the best street in New York" because it bordered a river and park for most of its length. A reporter for the same newspaper said in 2018 that Riverside Drive "links a half-dozen historic neighborhoods and a parade of attractive architecture while offering open space across nearly its entire western flank". The fifth edition of the AIA Guide to New York City described Riverside Park and Drive as a "green ribbon of hills and hollows".

Riverside Drive, and the buildings along it, have been depicted in works of popular media. The 125th Street Viaduct has been seen in the movie The Amazing Spider-Man (2012), and scenes from Woody Allen's Manhattan (1979) were filmed at 265 Riverside Drive. She'll Drive the Big Car on David Bowie's album Reality (2003) features a woman driving along Riverside Drive.

== See also ==
- List of streets in Manhattan
- List of New York City Designated Landmarks in Manhattan from 59th to 110th Streets
- National Register of Historic Places listings in Manhattan from 59th to 110th Streets
