= Amiable Child Monument =

Monument within Riverside Park, New York City

Coordinates: 40°48′53.31″N 73°57′47.32″W

- Year: 1967
- Type: Granite
- Location: New York, New York, United States

The Amiable Child Monument is a monument located in New York City's Riverside Park. It stands west of the southbound lanes of Riverside Drive north of 122nd Street in Morningside Heights, Manhattan.

== History ==
It is a monument to a small boy who died in a fall down the adjacent steep bluff, in what was then an area of country homes near New York City. One side of the monument reads: “Erected to the Memory of an Amiable Child, St. Claire Pollock, Died 15 July 1797 in the Fifth Year of His Age.” The monument was erected above St Claire's grave by George Pollock, who was either the boy's father or his uncle. It is across the street from Grant's Tomb.

The monument is composed of an urn on a pedestal, both of stone, enclosed by a wrought iron fence. The original monument was marble, enhanced by the additional of a marble urn a few years later, around the time that the Pollock family sold the property to Cornelia Verplanck. The monument has been replaced twice due to deterioration, first in by the city in 1897, also in marble, and then in 1967, in granite.

During Morningside Heights’s Golden Age, when the nearby Claremont Inn served luminaries that included George M. Cohan, Cole Porter, Lillian Russell and Mayor Jimmy Walker, the site inspired pilgrimages and poetry. Of the many verses written about the memorial is Herman George Scheffauer’s “An Amiable Child,” which describes the grave as being “like a song of peace in iron frays.” An identically named poem by Anna Markham, wife of proletarian author and critic Edwin Markham, opens with the lines that defined the monument for her contemporaries: “At Riverside, on the slow hill-slant / Two memoried graves are seen / A granite dome is over Grant / and over a child the green.” The monument is also the inspiration for Irene Marcuse's novel Death of an Amiable Child.

By one late nineteenth-century account, as related by Donald Reynolds, an attempt to relocate the grave in order to clear space for General Grant's tomb, which was quickly abandoned by the city after a groundswell of public opposition, transformed the “tribute to the gentleness that underlies the apparent brutality of the great city” into “almost a national institution”.

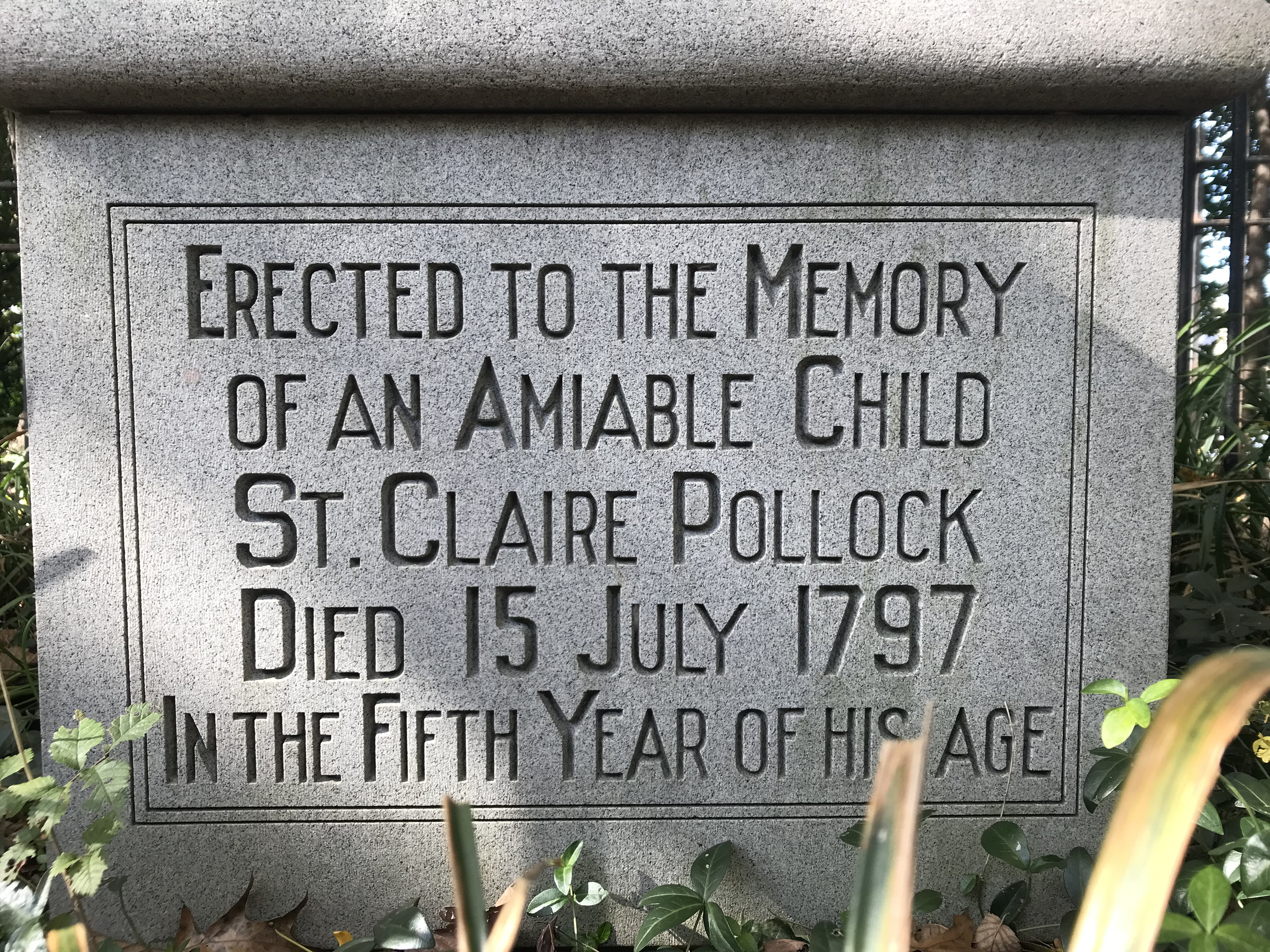
Monumental inscription carved into stone on one side of the Amiable Child Monument, reading: "Erected to the Memory of an Amiable Child, St. Claire Pollock, Died 15 July 1797 in the Fifth Year of His Age."

Nearby St. Clair Place, originally the western end of West 129th Street, was renamed in 1920, likely in reference to young St. Claire.

The monument is thought to be the only single-person private grave on city-owned land in New York City.
