= Charles M. Schwab House =

Demolished mansion in Manhattan, New York

Coordinates: 40.7811°N 73.9845°W

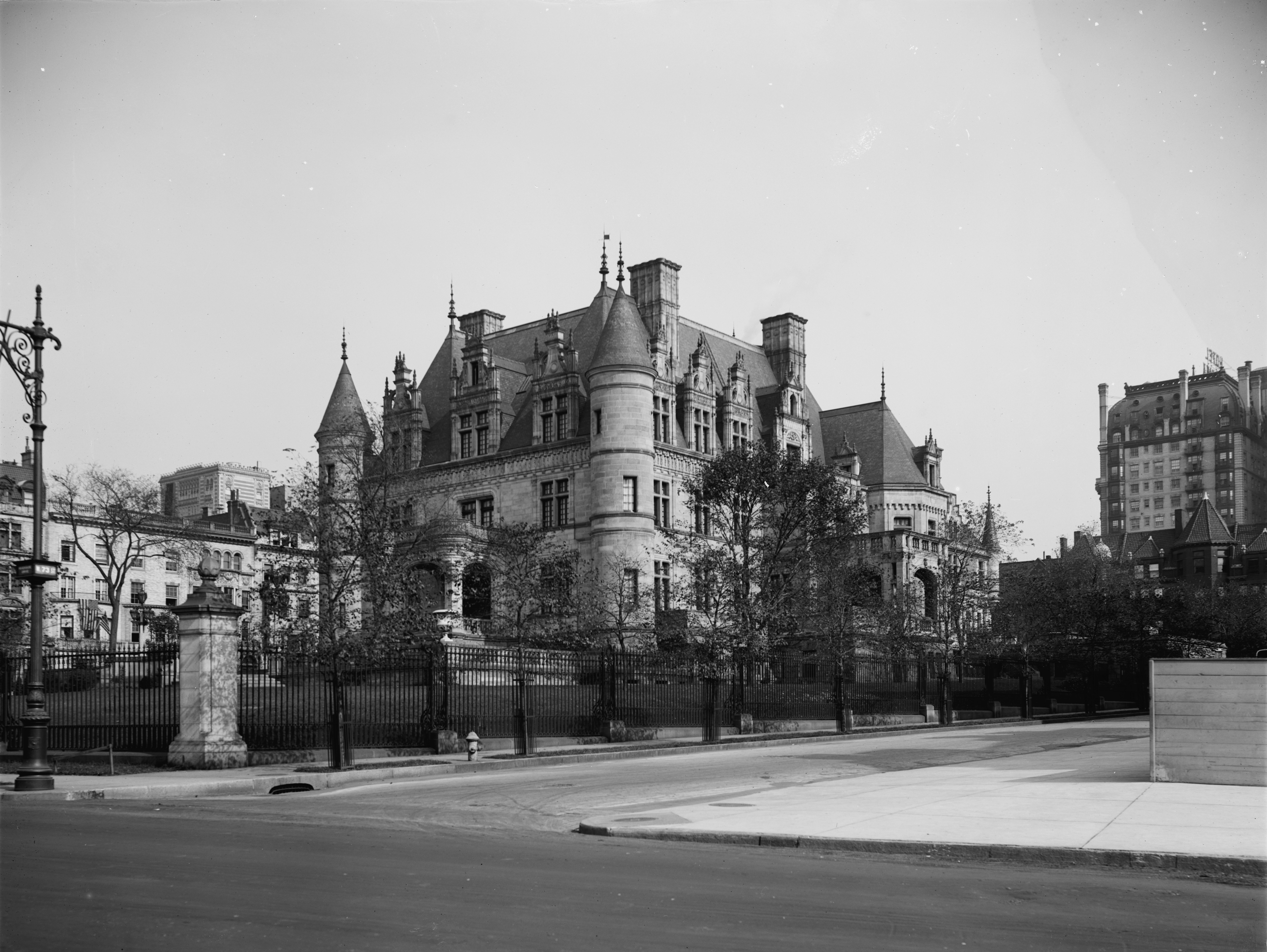
- Interactive map of the Charles M. Schwab House area

General information
- Architectural style: eclectic Beaux-Arts
- Location: Manhattan, New York City
- Construction started: 1902
- Completed: 1906
- Demolished: 1948

Design and construction
- Architect: Maurice Hébert

The Charles M. Schwab House (also called Riverside) was a 75-room mansion on Riverside Drive, between 73rd and 74th Streets, on the Upper West Side of Manhattan in New York City. It was constructed for steel magnate Charles M. Schwab. The home was considered to be the classic example of a "white elephant", as it was built on the "wrong" side of Central Park away from the more fashionable Upper East Side.

== History ==
Schwab was a self-made man who became president of U.S. Steel and later founded Bethlehem Steel Company. Schwab built "Riverside" after leaving Bethlehem, Pennsylvania for New York. The large property, an entire city block, was available because it formed half the site of the former New York Colored Orphan Asylum, one of several charitable institutions in the Bloomingdale District that gave way to large projects in Morningside Heights, such as the Cathedral of St. John the Divine and Columbia University's campus. The Ansonia Hotel now occupies the orphans' Broadway frontage. The financier Jacob Schiff had bought the parcel, but—ominously for the social future of the Upper West Side—Mrs. Schiff refused to move to the "wrong" side of Central Park.

The home was designed by an architect with only a modest reputation, Maurice Hébert, as an eclectic Beaux-Arts mixture of pink granite features. It combined details from three French Renaissance châteaux: Chenonceau, the exterior staircase from Blois, and Azay-le-Rideau. It took four years to build the home (1902–1906) at a cost of six million dollars. The house enclosed 50,000 square feet (4,600 m^{2}) in 75 rooms, including a bowling alley, pool, and three elevators. Schwab's former employer and mentor Andrew Carnegie, whose own mansion on upper Fifth Avenue later became the Cooper-Hewitt Museum, once remarked, "Have you seen that place of Charlie's? It makes mine look like a shack."

Schwab was a risk-taker and later went bankrupt in the Wall Street crash of 1929. Although it was reported that he planned to sell the property to developers in 1930, that year's census recorded that he still lived at the house with his wife and twenty mostly English-born servants. He eventually became "anxious to sell" the property, offering the house as the city's official mayoral residence in 1935. Then-mayor Fiorello La Guardia turned it down, saying "What, me in that?" After his wife died in January 1939, he moved out of the house and into a hotel, bequeathing "Riverside" to the city government. He died six months later, his fortune significantly reduced from its peak.

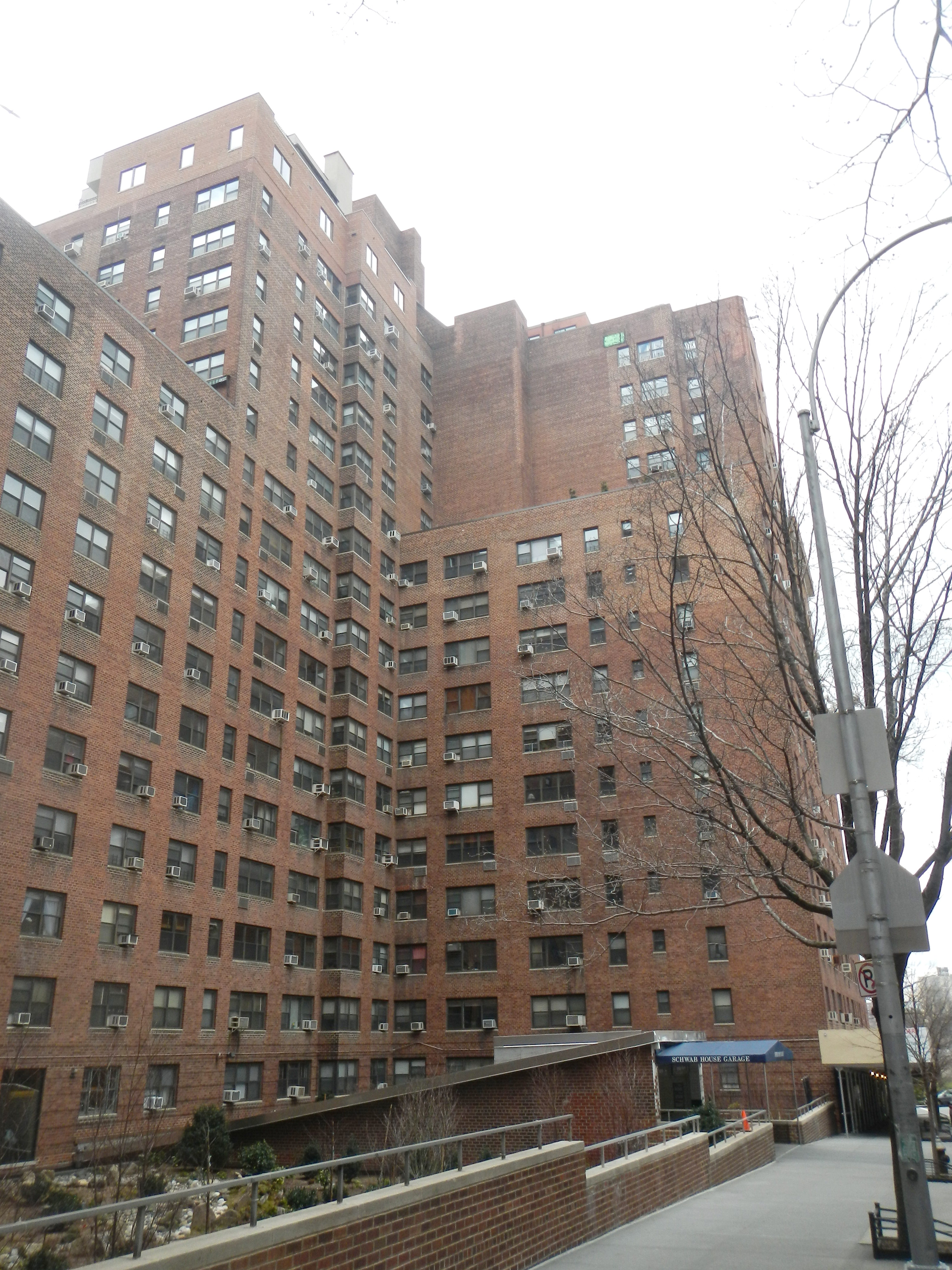
Schwab House apartment building, 74th Street

La Guardia's rejection of the mansion sealed its fate, and during World War II, it was subdivided into apartments, a Victory garden in its once-landscaped grounds. Eventually the many dwellings around the home became overcrowded and Riverside Drive lost whatever affluence and wealth that had existed. By 1947 the house was empty and in 1948 it was replaced by a large, red-brick apartment complex, known as the Schwab House.
