= Charles M. Schwab =

American steel magnate (1862–1939)

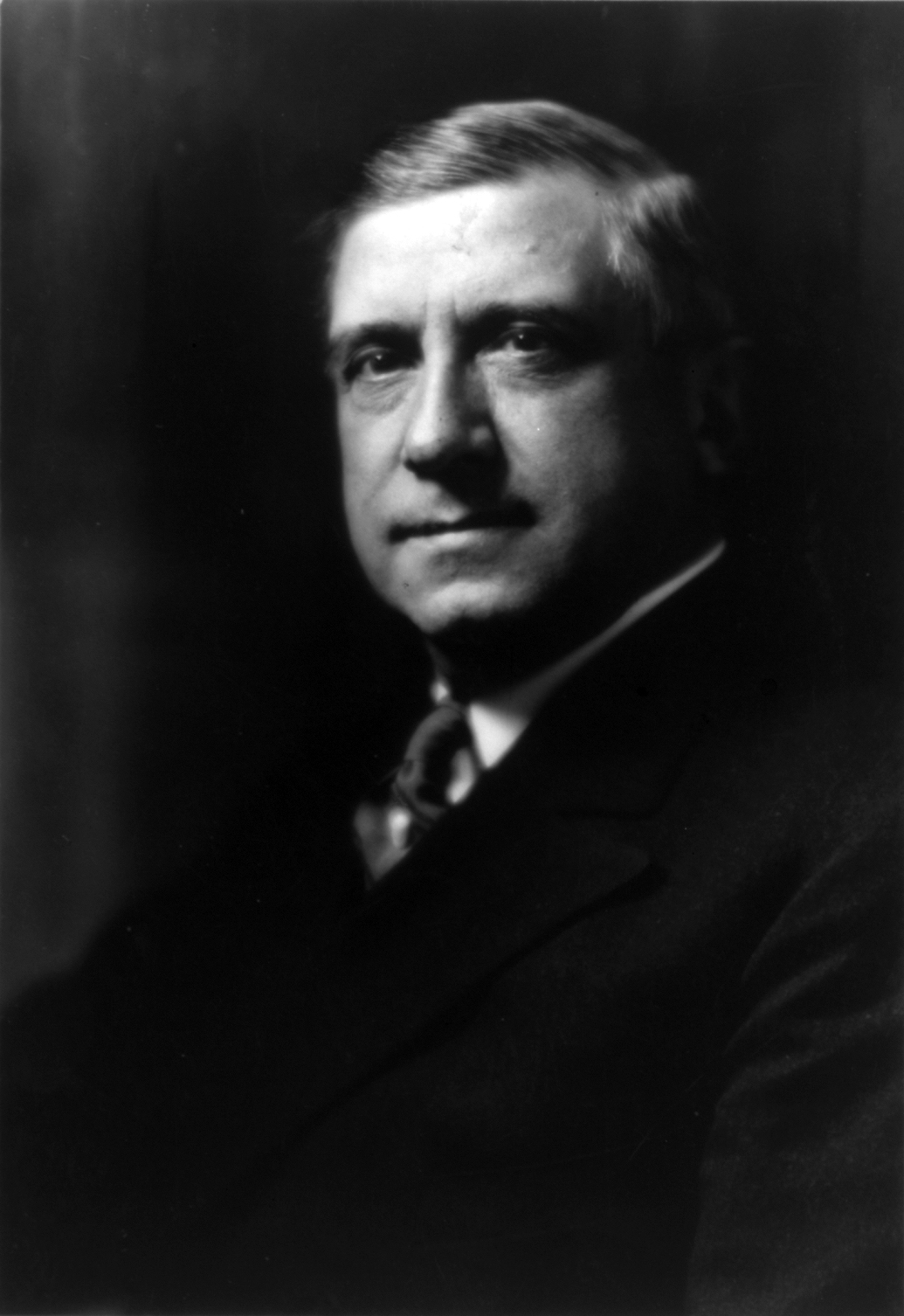
- Schwab in 1918
- Born: Charles Michael Schwab; February 18, 1862; Williamsburg, Pennsylvania, U.S.
- Died: September 18, 1939 (aged 77); New York City, New York, U.S.
- Resting place: Saint Michael Cemetery; Loretto, Pennsylvania, U.S.
- Education: Saint Francis University
- Occupations: Engineer, industrialist, philanthropist
- Title: President of United States Steel Corporation; President and chairman of Bethlehem Steel
- Spouse: Emma Eurana Dinkey (m. 1883; died 1939)
- Children: 1

Signature
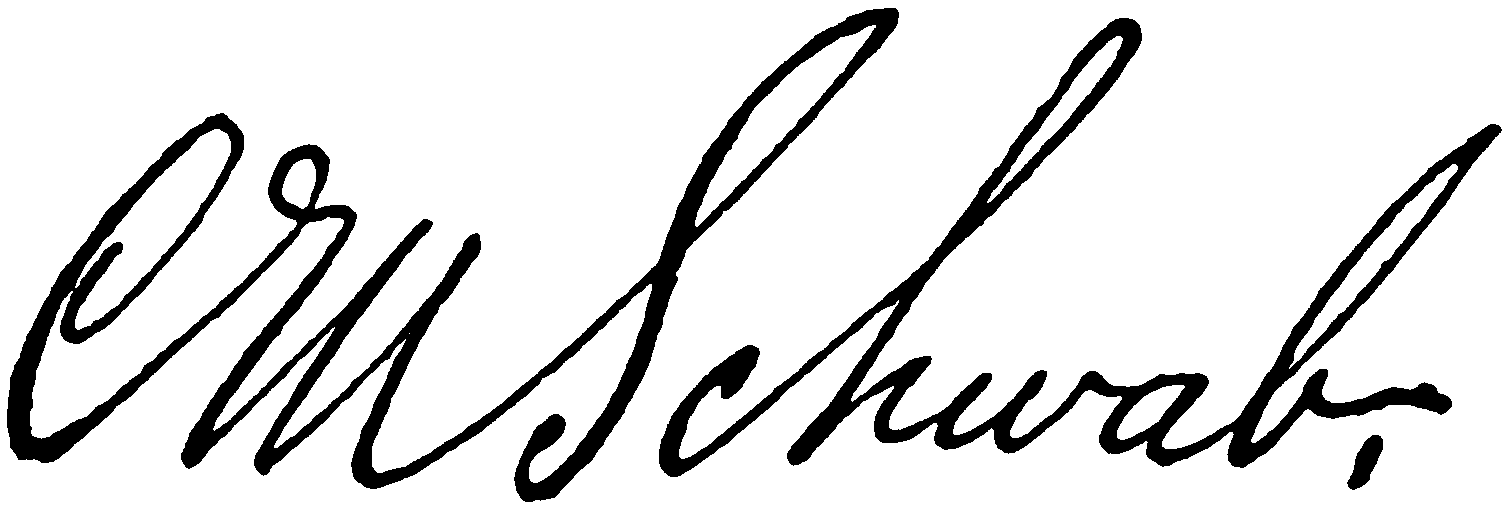

Charles Michael Schwab (February 18, 1862 – September 18, 1939) was an American steel magnate. Under his leadership, Bethlehem Steel became the second-largest steel maker in the United States, and one of the most important heavy manufacturers in the world.

== Early life and education ==
Schwab was born in Williamsburg, Pennsylvania, on February 18, 1862, the son of Pauline (née Farabaugh) and John Anthony Schwab. All four of his grandparents were Roman Catholic immigrants from Germany.

Schwab was raised in Loretto, Pennsylvania, which he considered his hometown. His father, John, operated a livery stable in Loretto and also served as a mail-carrier.

Schwab graduated from Saint Francis College in Loretto in 1877.

== Career ==
=== Carnegie Steel ===
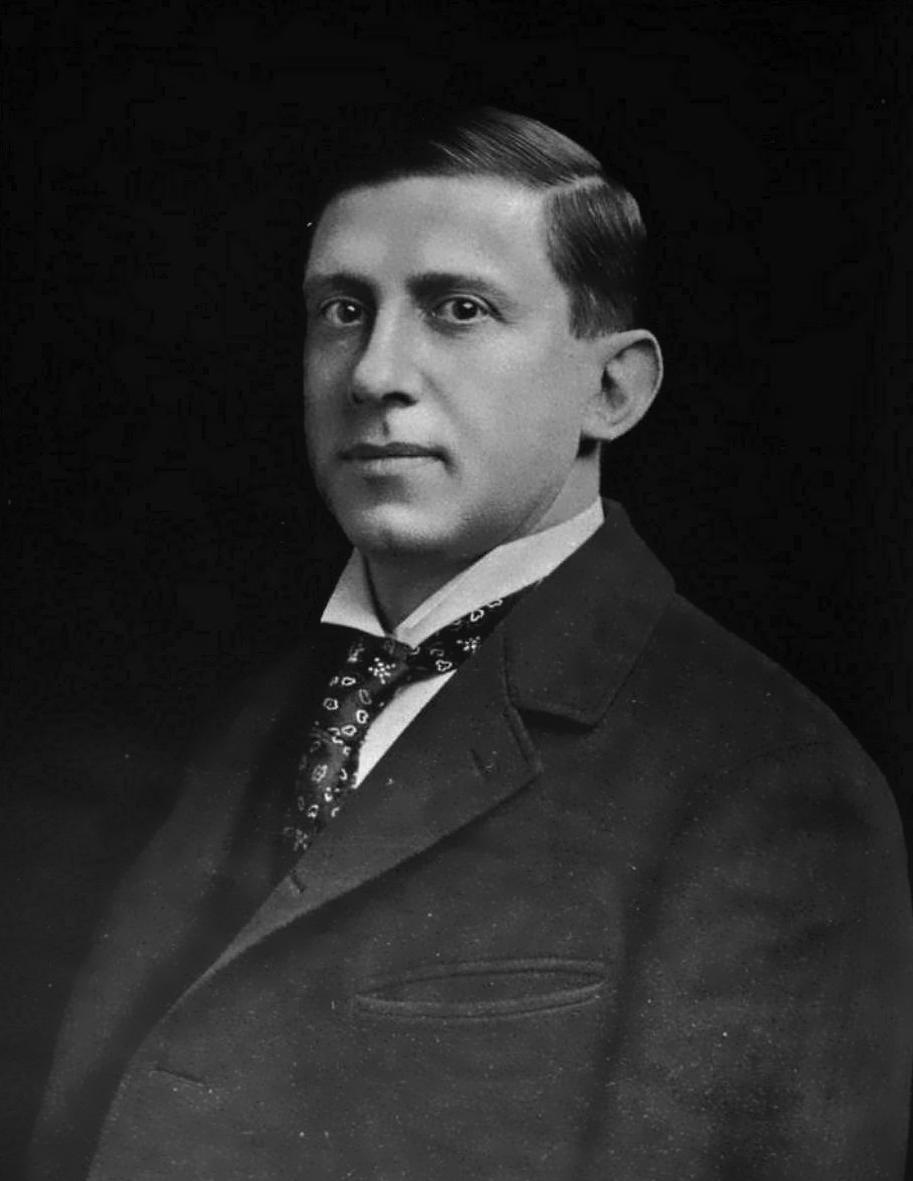
Schwab in 1901 at age 39

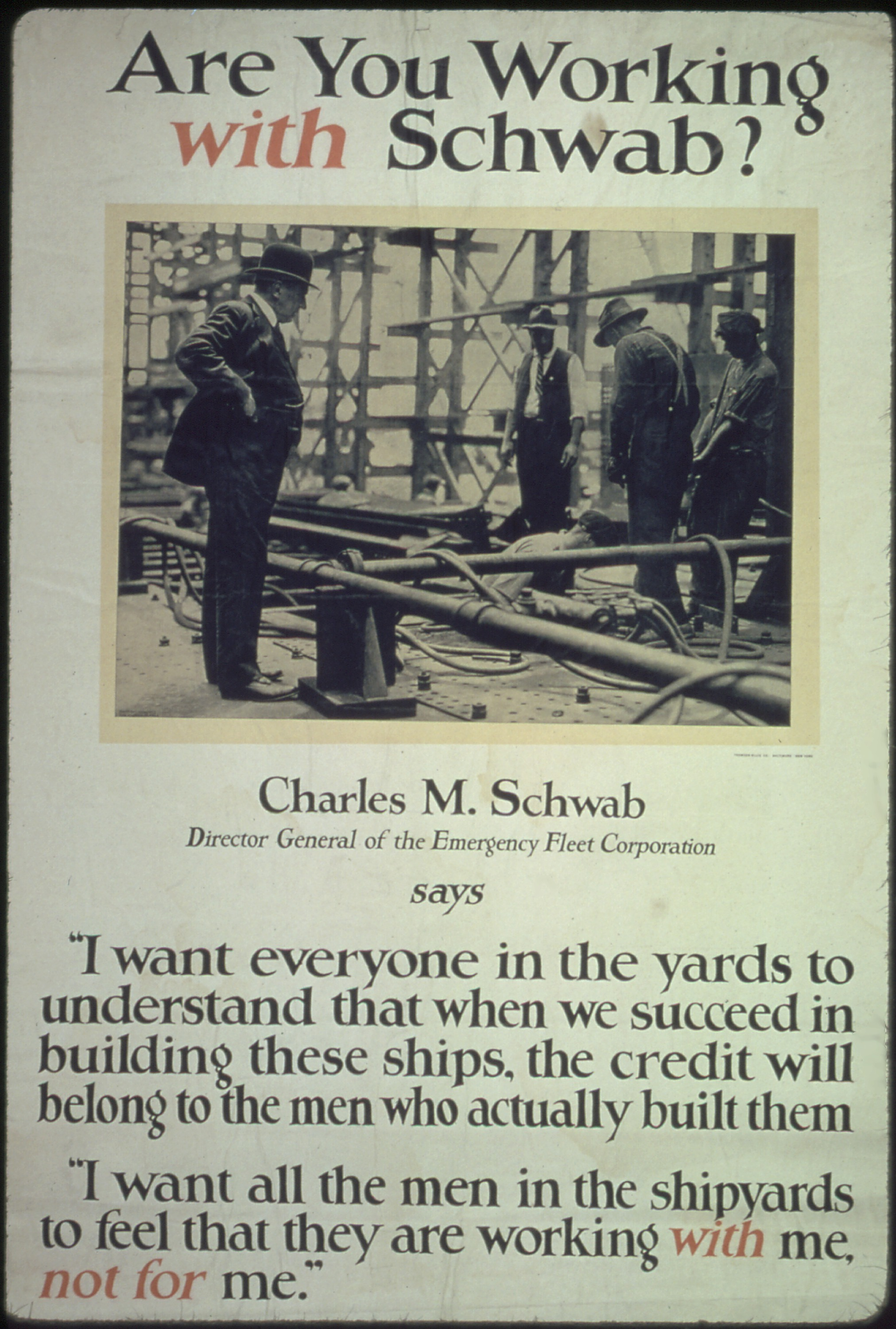
A promotional poster for the Emergency Fleet Corporation, directed by Schwab in 1918

Schwab began his career as an engineer in Andrew Carnegie's steelworks, starting as a stake-driver in the engineering corps of the Edgar Thomson Steel Works and Furnaces in Braddock, Pennsylvania. He was promoted often, including to the positions of general superintendent of Homestead Works in 1887, and general superintendent of the Edgar Thomson Steel Works in 1890. In 1897, at only 35 years of age, he became president of the Carnegie Steel Company.

In 1901, he helped negotiate the secret sale of Carnegie Steel to a group of New York City–based financiers, led by J. P. Morgan. After the buyout, Schwab became the first president of the United States Steel Corporation, the company formed out of Carnegie's former holdings.

=== Bethlehem Steel ===
In 1903, after several clashes with Morgan and fellow US Steel executive Elbert Gary, Schwab left the company to run the Bethlehem Shipbuilding and Steel Company, which ultimately became Bethlehem Steel, in Bethlehem, Pennsylvania. The company had shipyards in California, Delaware, and New Jersey through its brief but fortunate involvement as one of the few solvent enterprises in United States Shipbuilding Company.

Under Schwab's leadership and that of Eugene Grace, Bethlehem Steel emerged as one of the largest independent steel producers in the world. A major part of the company's success was the development of the H-beam, a precursor of today's ubiquitous I-beam. Schwab was interested in mass-producing the wide flange steel beam, but that was a risky venture that required raising capital and building a large new plant, all to make a product whose ability to sell was unproven. In his most famous remark, Schwab told his secretary, "I've thought the whole thing over, and if we are going bust, we will go bust big."

In 1908, Bethlehem Steel began making the beam, which revolutionized building construction and contributed to the age of the skyscraper. Its success helped make Bethlehem Steel the second-largest steel company in the world. Bethlehem, Pennsylvania, was incorporated, virtually as a company town, by uniting four previous villages. In 1910, Schwab broke the Bethlehem Steel strike by calling out the newly formed Pennsylvania State Police. Schwab successfully kept labor unions out of Bethlehem Steel throughout his tenure, although Bethlehem Steel unionized in 1941, two years after his death.

In 1911, Bethlehem Steel formed a company soccer team known as Bethlehem Steel F.C. Three years later, in 1914, Schwab took the team professional. Until its demise in 1930, the team won eight league championships, six American Cups, and five National Challenge Cups. It was considered among the greatest soccer teams in U.S. history. The company disbanded the team as a result of financial losses incurred during the internecine 1928–1929 "Soccer Wars" between American Soccer League and United States Football Association and the onset of the Great Depression in 1929.

During the first years of World War I, Bethlehem Steel had a virtual monopoly in contracts to supply the Allies with certain kinds of munitions. During this period, Schwab made many visits to Europe in connection with the manufacture and supply of munitions to the Allied governments. He circumvented American neutrality laws by funneling goods through Canada.

On April 16, 1918, Schwab became director general of Emergency Fleet Corporation, a board granted by Congress with master authority over all shipbuilding in the United States. He was appointed over Charles Piez, the former general manager of the corporation. President Wilson had specifically asked Schwab to assume this responsibility. Schwab's biggest change to the shipbuilding effort was to abandon the cost plus profit contracting system that had been in place up to that time and begin issuing fixed-price contracts. After America's entry into the war, he was accused of profiteering but was later acquitted.

Schwab was considered to be a risk taker and was highly controversial; Thomas Edison once famously called him the "master hustler". Schwab's lucrative contract providing steel to the Trans-Siberian Railroad came after he provided a $200,000 "gift" to the mistress of the Grand Duke Alexis Aleksandrovich.

In 1918, Schwab was elected an honorary member of the American Society of Mechanical Engineers (ASME); he later served as president of ASME. In 1928, he was awarded the Bessemer Gold Medal for "outstanding services to the steel industry". In 1932, he was awarded the Melchett Medal by the British Institute of Fuel. In 1982, Schwab was inducted into the Junior Achievement U.S. Business Hall of Fame. In 2011, Schwab was inducted into the inaugural class of the American Metal Market Hall of Fame for his lifelong work in the U.S. steel industry. His innovative ways of dealing with his staff are mentioned in Dale Carnegie's most famous work, How to Win Friends and Influence People, published in 1936.

== Personal life ==
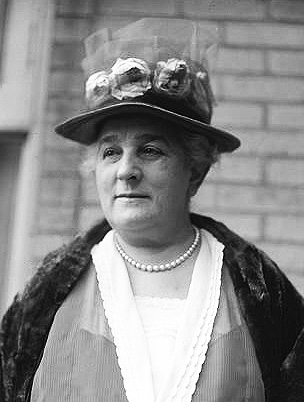
Schwab's wife Emma in 1918

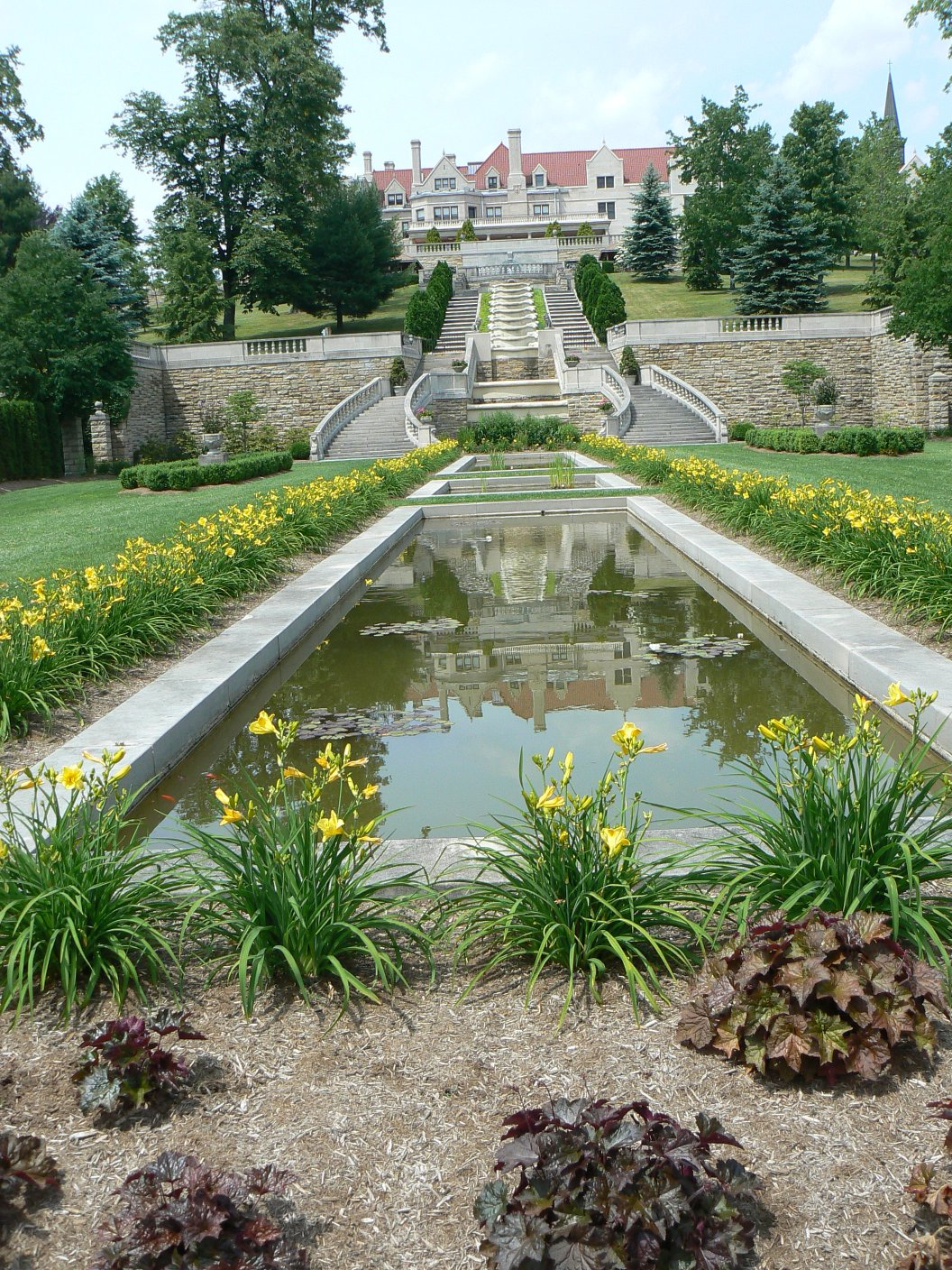
The main house, cascades, and gardens at "Immergrün", Schwab's retreat in Loretto, Pennsylvania

Schwab married Emma Eurana Dinkey (1859–1939) on May 1, 1883. Mrs. Schwab lived in Weatherly, Pennsylvania, and donated $85,000 to build a school there.

Schwab eventually became very wealthy. He moved to New York City's Upper West Side, which at the time was considered the "wrong" side of Central Park, where he built "Riverside", the most ambitious private house ever built in New York City. The $7 million 75-room house, designed by French architect Maurice Hébert, combined details from three French chateaux on a full city block. After Schwab's death, Mayor Fiorello La Guardia turned down a proposal to make Riverside the official mayoral residence, deeming it too grandiose. It was eventually razed and replaced by an apartment block.

Schwab also owned a 44-room summer estate on 1,000 acres (4 km^{2}) in Loretto, Pennsylvania, called "Immergrün", German for "evergreen". The house featured opulent gardens and a nine-hole golf course. Rather than raze the existing house, Schwab had the mansion moved 200 feet (61 m) on rollers to a new location to make room for the new mansion. Schwab's estate sold Immergrün after his death, and it is now Mount Assisi Friary owned by the Franciscan friars (Third Order Regular) who administer the adjacent Saint Francis University. The golf course, now known as “Immergrun Golf Club”, designed in 1917 by Donald Ross, is owned and operated by the university.

The gardens feature a cascading fountain modeled after features at Versailles and include sculptures by Paul Manship, known for the Prometheus sculpture at Rockefeller Center in Manhattan.

Schwab became notorious for his "fast lane" lifestyle including opulent parties, high-stakes gambling, and a string of extramarital affairs producing at least one child out of wedlock. The affairs and the out-of-wedlock child soured his relationship with his wife. He became an international celebrity when he "broke the bank" at Monte Carlo, and traveled in a $100,000 private rail car named "Loretto". He appeared in the 1918 film The Yellow Dog. Even before the Great Depression, he had already spent most of his fortune, estimated at between $25 million and $40 million. Adjusted for inflation in the first decade of the 21st century, that equates to between $500 million and $800 million.

The stock market crash of 1929 finished off what years of wanton spending had started. He spent his last years in a small apartment. He could no longer afford the taxes on "Riverside", and it was seized by creditors. He had offered to sell the mansion at a huge loss but there were no buyers. At his death ten years later, Schwab's holdings in Bethlehem Steel were virtually worthless, and he was over $300,000 in debt. Had he lived a few more years, he would have seen his fortunes restored when Bethlehem Steel was flooded with orders for war material. Schwab had no children by Emma Dinkey, but had one daughter by a mistress.

A bust-length portrait of Schwab painted in 1903 by Swiss-born American artist Adolfo Müller-Ury (1862–1947) was formerly in the Jessica Dragonette Collection at the American Heritage Center at the University of Wyoming at Laramie, but has been donated to the National Portrait Gallery in Washington, D.C. Müller-Ury also painted his nephew and namesake Charles M. Schwab, son of his brother Joseph, as a boy in a sailor suit around the same date.

== Death ==
Schwab's wife died on January 12, 1939. Schwab died nine months later, on September 18 of that year, of heart disease at his apartment on Park Avenue in New York City. His funeral was held at St. Patrick's Cathedral and about 2,000 people were estimated to line the streets of the procession. Al Smith, John D. Rockefeller Jr., and Charles Evans Hughes were among those in attendance at his funeral. He was originally interred at the Gate of Heaven Cemetery in Hawthorne, New York, but his remains were moved on April 29, 1940, to a private mausoleum at Saint Michael Catholic Church Cemetery in Loretto, Pennsylvania.

== In popular culture ==
- A portrayal of Schwab is featured in the History Channel's 2012 miniseries docudrama The Men Who Built America.

== See also ==
- List of covers of Time magazine (1920s): November 22, 1926
