= The Caine Mutiny (1954 film) =

1954 war drama film by Edward Dmytryk

- Original film poster
- Directed by: Edward Dmytryk
- Written by: Stanley Roberts; Michael Blankfort
- Based on: The Caine Mutiny (1951 novel) by Herman Wouk
- Produced by: Stanley Kramer
- Starring: Humphrey Bogart; José Ferrer; Van Johnson; Fred MacMurray; Robert Francis; May Wynn; Tom Tully
- Cinematography: Franz Planer
- Edited by: Henry Batista; William A. Lyon
- Music by: Max Steiner
- Production company: Stanley Kramer Productions
- Distributed by: Columbia Pictures
- Release date: June 24, 1954 (New York City)
- Running time: 125 minutes
- Country: United States
- Language: English
- Budget: $2 million
- Box office: $21.8 million

The Caine Mutiny is a 1954 American military trial film directed by Edward Dmytryk, produced by Stanley Kramer, and starring Humphrey Bogart, José Ferrer, Van Johnson, Robert Francis, and Fred MacMurray. It is based on Herman Wouk's Pulitzer Prize-winning 1951 novel of the same name. Set in the Pacific theatre of World War II, the film depicts the events on board a U.S. Navy destroyer-minesweeper and the subsequent court-martial of its executive officer for mutiny.

The film was released by Columbia Pictures on June 24, 1954. It was well-received by critics and was the second highest-grossing film in the United States in 1954. At the 27th Academy Awards, the film was nominated for seven Oscars, including Best Picture, Best Adapted Screenplay, and Best Actor for Bogart. Edward Dmytryk was nominated for a Directors Guild of America Award.

== Plot ==
During World War II, newly commissioned Ensign Willis Seward "Willie" Keith reports to the minesweeper USS Caine, where he meets career officer Lieutenant Stephen Maryk, the ship’s executive officer, and aspiring novelist and communications officer Lieutenant Thomas Keefer. Soon after, Lieutenant Commander Philip Francis Queeg is assigned command of the Caine. The eccentric Queeg imposes strict discipline on the lax crew, making him unpopular with them, but initially admired by Keith.

During a gunnery target towing exercise, Queeg is distracted berating Keith and Keefer over a crewman’s appearance, resulting in the ship's steering over and cutting the towline, setting the target adrift. Queeg tries to cover up the incident.

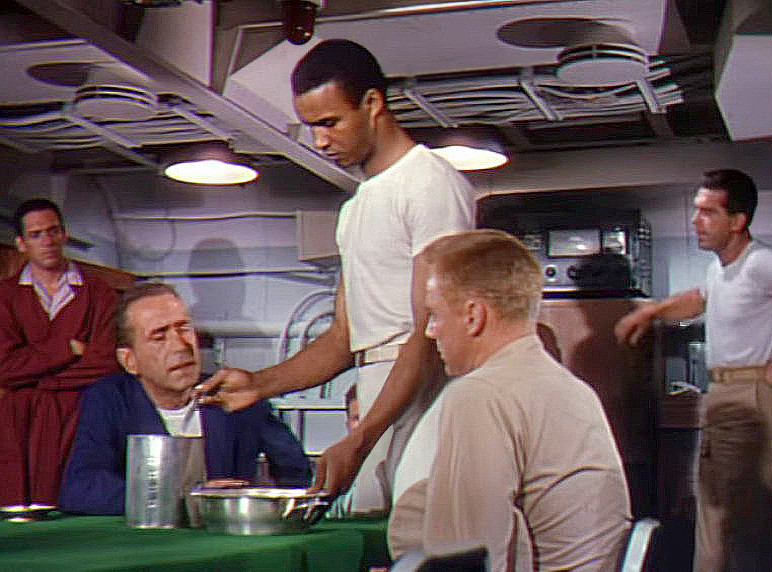
The "strawberry investigation".

Assigned to escort a group of landing craft during an invasion of a small Pacific island, Queeg abandons his mission before he reaches the designated departure point; instead, he orders the dropping of a yellow dye marker, leaving the crew of the landing craft to fend for themselves. Queeg asks his officers for their support, but they remain silent and nickname him "Old Yellow Stain", implying cowardice.

Believing Queeg to be paranoid, Keefer encourages Maryk to consider relieving Queeg on the basis of mental incapacity under Article 184 of Navy Regulations. Though Maryk angrily rejects that possibility, he does begin keeping a medical log documenting the captain's behavior.

Attempting to justify a strict need for discipline onboard, where even small infractions matter to maintain order, Queeg relates to his officers an account on a previous assignment where he received a commendation for an investigation to stop pilfering that involved stolen supplies of cheese. When a quart of strawberries goes missing from the officers' mess, Queeg convenes an elaborate investigation to determine the culprit. Even though the mess stewards confess to having helped themselves to the missing portions, Queeg orders the berths searched and crew members strip searched. Convinced of Queeg's instability, trying to relive past “glory”, Keefer again urges Maryk to expose Queeg’s unfitness for duty. Maryk asks Keefer and Keith to go with him to report to Admiral Halsey about the matter. Arriving aboard Halsey's flagship, Keefer backs down, warning of the danger of accusing a captain, and they return to the ship.

At the height of a typhoon, Maryk urges the captain to reverse course into the wind and take on ballast, but Queeg refuses and virtually freezes up on the bridge. Supported by Keith, Maryk relieves Queeg of command under Article 184. The Caine returns to San Francisco, where Maryk and Keith face a court-martial for mutiny. Lieutenant Barney Greenwald, a temporarily grounded naval aviator and an attorney before entering the Navy, becomes Maryk's defense counsel.

At the court-martial, Keefer testifies that he never observed any mental illness in Queeg and was "flabbergasted" when Queeg was relieved. Later, when Queeg takes the stand, he exhibits odd behavior under Greenwald's relentless cross-examination, including his habit of rolling two steel balls in his hand manifesting his mental instability. Maryk is acquitted.

Following the acquittal, the officers of the Caine hold a party, where Keefer receives a frosty reception from Maryk. A drunken Greenwald arrives, remorseful about having had to expose Queeg to defend the wrongly accused Maryk instead of the man who should have been held accountable. He berates all the officers for not taking into account Queeg's long service and for failing to give Queeg the support he asked for, instead of deriding him as an incompetent. Greenwald claims their mistreatment of Queeg, who had been suffering from "battle fatigue" from his previous combat service in the Atlantic, caused the captain to become indecisive during the typhoon. He denounces Keefer as the real "author" of the mutiny, exposing to all present how Keefer disclaimed in his testimony his repeated unqualified "diagnosis" of Queeg's mental illness. Greenwald throws a glass of champagne, the "yellow wine", in Keefer's face. The rest of the officers walk out, leaving Keefer alone in the room.

Later married to his girlfriend, May Wynn, Keith is promoted to Lieutenant (junior grade), and assigned to a new Allen M. Sumner-class destroyer commanded by now-Commander De Vriess, his first captain on the Caine.

== Cast ==
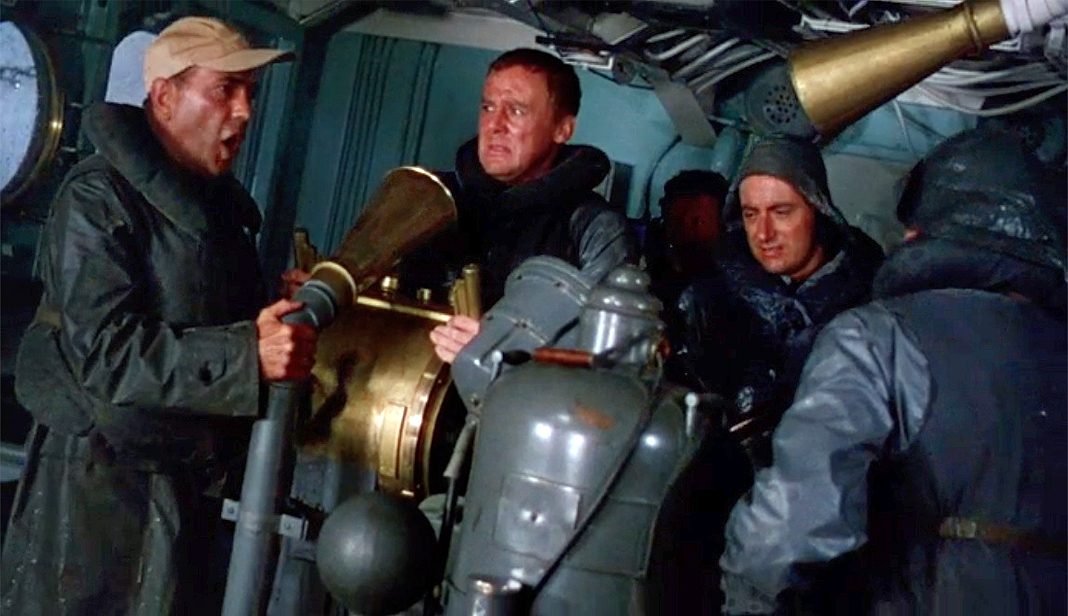
The act of mutiny: Maryk's relief of Queeg during the typhoon.

- Humphrey Bogart as LCDR Philip Francis Queeg
- José Ferrer as LT Barney Greenwald
- Van Johnson as LT Steve Maryk
- Fred MacMurray as LT Tom Keefer
- Robert Francis as ENS (later LTJG) Willis Seward "Willie" Keith
- May Wynn as May Wynn (Note: Wynn's birth name was "Donna Lee Hickey"; she adopted her stage name from the character in Wouk's original novel.)
- Tom Tully as LCDR (later CDR) William H. De Vriess
- E. G. Marshall as LCDR John Challee, the JAG prosecutor
- Arthur Franz as LTJG H. Paynter Jr.
- Lee Marvin as "Meatball"
- Warner Anderson as CAPT Blakely, President of the court-martial
- Claude Akins as "Horrible"
- Katherine Warren as Mrs. Keith, Ensign Keith's mother
- Jerry Paris as ENS Barney Harding
- Steve Brodie as CWO Budge

Uncredited

- Todd Karns as QM1 John Stilwell
- Whit Bissell as LCDR Dixon, MC, Navy psychiatrist
- James Best as LTJG Jorgensen
- Joe Haworth as ENS Carmody
- Herbert Anderson as ENS Rabbit
- James Edwards as SA Whittaker

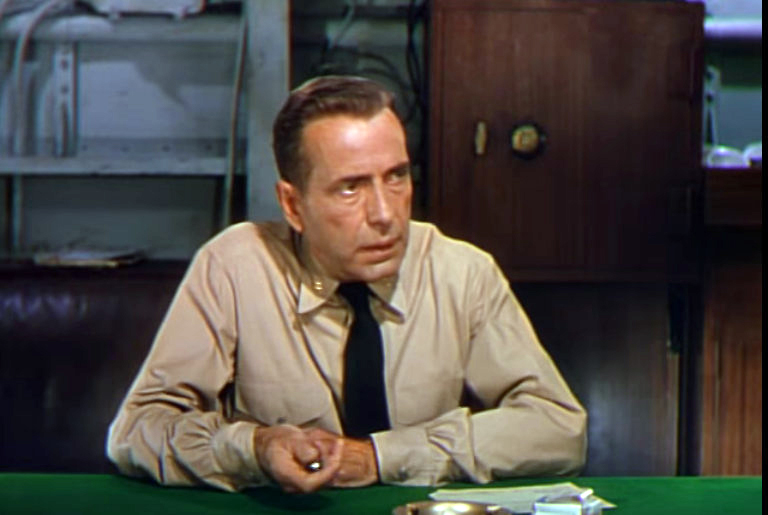
Humphrey Bogart

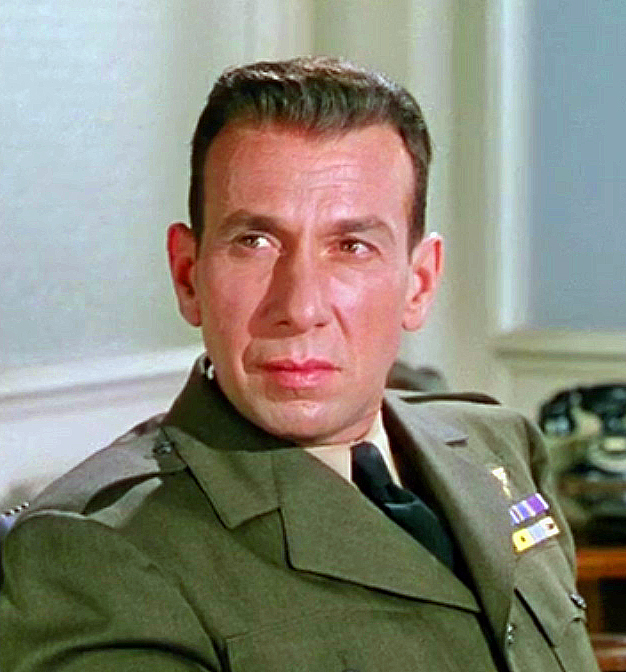
José Ferrer

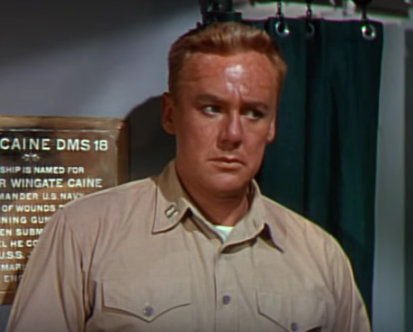
Van Johnson

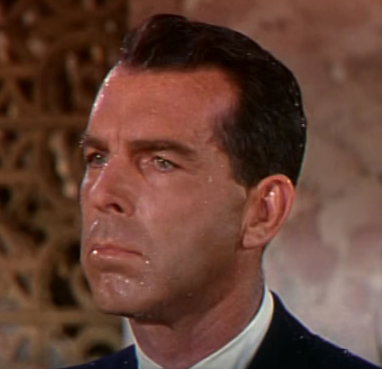
Fred MacMurray, after champagne has been flung in his face

== Pre-production ==
=== Writing ===
Herman Wouk had already adapted his novel as a stage play, The Caine Mutiny Court-Martial, which premiered on Broadway in January 1954 and ran for more than a year. The play was directed by Charles Laughton and was a critical as well as a commercial success. Wouk was initially selected to write the screenplay, but director Dmytryk was dissatisfied with his draft. He replaced the novelist with Stanley Roberts, an experienced screenwriter. Roberts later quit the production after being told to cut the screenplay so the film could be kept to two hours. The 50 pages worth of cuts were made by Michael Blankfort, who received an "additional dialog" credit.

The film differs from the novel, which focused on the Keith character, who became secondary in the film. The film instead focuses on Queeg. Independent producer Stanley Kramer "mollified the Navy" by modifying the Queeg characterization to make him less of a madman, as portrayed by Wouk, and more a victim of battle fatigue. Studios did not want to purchase the film rights to Wouk's novel until cooperation of the U.S. Navy was settled. Kramer purchased the rights himself for an estimated $60,000 – $70,000. The Navy's reluctance to cooperate led to an unusually long pre-production period.

=== Casting and director ===
Stanley Kramer and Columbia Pictures intended to cast Humphrey Bogart as Philip Queeg. Columbia Pictures president Harry Cohn knew that Bogart wanted the part and took advantage of that fact, and he was eventually able to force Bogart to settle for much less than his usual $200,000 salary. "This never happens to Cooper or Grant or Gable, but always to me", Bogart complained to his wife, Lauren Bacall.

Van Johnson was loaned to Columbia by MGM, where he was under contract. Being cast as Maryk was a breakthrough for the actor, who felt that he had been in a "rut" by being typecast in light roles. During the filming of the scene off Oahu in which Maryk swims fully clothed to retrieve a line, his character is warned that there are sharks in the water; these sharks do not appear on camera, but the actor's life was saved when a real-life Navy rifleman shot one which was approaching. Lee Marvin was cast as one of the sailors, not only for his acting, but also because of his knowledge of ships at sea. Marvin had served in the U.S. Marines from the beginning of American involvement in World War II through the Battle of Saipan in 1944, during which he was wounded. As a result, he became an unofficial technical advisor for the film.

Before choosing Dmytryk for The Caine Mutiny, Kramer had hired the director for three low-budget films. Dmytryk had previously been blacklisted, and the success of the film helped revive his career.

The Caine Mutiny would be the first feature role in Robert Francis's short four-film Hollywood career, as he was killed when the private plane he was piloting crashed shortly after takeoff from Burbank Airport in California on July 31, 1955.

== Production ==
=== Filming ===
Principal photography took place between June 3 and August 24, 1953 under the initial working title of Authority and Rebellion.

In addition to the Pearl Harbor and San Francisco Bay Area locations, including the Caine steaming back and forth several times under the Golden Gate Bridge, the romantic subplot features scenes shot on location at Yosemite National Park.

The USS Rodman, a Gleaves-class destroyer minesweeper, was one of the ships chosen to represent the USS Caine in the film. The Rodman had two fewer smokestacks than the actual Clemson-class destroyers on which Wouk served, and had more anti-aircraft guns. Completed in 1941, she was a much more modern ship than the 1918-manufactured Clemson-class destroyer minesweepers had been. True to the theme of the novel, the actual minesweepers of Wouk's service, the Zane and the Southard, were both outdated ships by the time the film was made. The Zane was retired shortly after the war, and the Southard was scuttled in October 1945 after running aground in Okinawa with Wouk serving as Executive Officer. One of the primary inspirations for the book and the movie came from Wouk's experience as second in command of the Southard when she ran aground in Okinawa as a result of Typhoon Ida in September 1945. The Essex-class aircraft carrier USS Kearsarge (CV-33) was used in depicting the abortive visit to Admiral William F. Halsey Jr. aboard his unnamed flagship.

Columbia claimed the film contained the longest continuous courtroom scene without a cut, running to 977 feet, surpassing a scene in The Life of Emile Zola.

=== Navy involvement ===
The Navy was initially uncomfortable with both the portrayal of a mentally unbalanced man as the captain of one of its ships and the word "mutiny" in the film's title. After Stanley Roberts' shooting script was completed and approved by the Navy after 15 months of negotiations, the Department agreed to cooperate with Columbia Pictures by providing access to its ships, planes, combat boats, Pearl Harbor, the port of San Francisco, and Naval Station Treasure Island for filming. Dmytryk recalled in his memoir that after "noisy" protests from the Navy subsided, the film production received wholehearted cooperation. This included the conversion of two soon to be decommissioned destroyer/destroyer minesweepers, USS Thompson and USS Doyle, as facsimiles to portray the USS Caine.

An epigraph appears on screen immediately following the opening credits that reads: "There has never been a mutiny in a ship of the United States Navy. The truths of this film lie not in its incidents, but in the way a few men meet the crisis of their lives." In 1842, an incipient mutiny was quelled before it occurred on board the US Navy Brig USS Somers.

== Music ==
This was the last of a number of Bogart films scored by composer Max Steiner, mostly for Warner Bros. The main title theme, The Caine Mutiny March, was included in RCA Victor's collection of classic Bogart film scores, recorded by Charles Gerhardt and the National Philharmonic Orchestra.

The lyrics of the song, "Yellowstain Blues", which mocked Queeg's perceived cowardice during the landing incident, were drawn from the source novel.

=== Soundtrack ===
The original soundtrack album for The Caine Mutiny was not officially released until 2017, and copies of the soundtrack made before that are very rare. Perhaps a dozen copies survive. RCA Victor planned an LP release with musical excerpts on the first side and the complete dialogue of the climactic court-martial scene on side two, but Herman Wouk believed that including this scene was an infringement on his recently opened Broadway play dealing with the court-martial. He threatened to prohibit Columbia Pictures from making any further adaptations of his work. According to Wouk, "Columbia head Harry Cohn looked into the matter, called me back, and said in his tough gravelly voice, 'I've got you beat on the legalities, but I've listened to the record and it's no goddamn good, so I'm yanking it.'" Max Steiner's score was finally released by Intrada Records in 2017 as Special Collection Volume ISC 382.

== Reception ==
The film premiered in New York City on June 24, 1954, and went into general release on July 28. Made on a budget of $2 million, it was the second-highest-grossing film of 1954, earning $8.7 million in theatrical rentals in the United States. It was the most successful of Kramer's productions, some of which had previously lost money, and put his entire production company – as well as Columbia Pictures – in the black.

The film got a major pre-release boost three weeks before its premiere when Bogart as Queeg appeared on the cover of the June 7, 1954 issue of Time magazine. The accompanying cover story ("Cinema: The Survivor") praised Bogart's portrayal of Queeg as "a blustering, secretive figure in Navy suntans, who brings the hollow, driven, tyrannical character of Captain Queeg to full and invidious life, yet seldom fails to maintain a bond of sympathy with his audience. He deliberately gives Queeg the mannerisms and appearance of an officer of sternness and decision, and then gradually discloses him as a man who is bottling up a scream, a man who never meets another's eyes. In the courtroom scene, Bogart's Queeg seems oblivious of his own mounting hysteria. Then, suddenly, he knows he is undone; he stops and stares stricken at the court, during second after ticking second of dramatic and damning silence."

Film critic Pauline Kael mentions that the film was a fiasco because the material disintegrated in the photography, direction and acting.

Director Edward Dmytryk felt The Caine Mutiny could have been better than it was and should have been three and a half to four hours long to fully portray all the characters and complex story, but Columbia's Cohn insisted on a two-hour limit. Reviewing the film in The New York Times, Bosley Crowther wrote that the job of condensing Wouk's novel to two hours had been achieved "with clarity and vigor, on the whole." His reservations concerned the studio's attempt to "cram" in "more of the novel than was required", such as the "completely extraneous" love affair between Keith and May Wynn, which Crowther found to be a plot diversion that weakened dramatic tension. Although he doubted whether the novel had a structure suited for film, he noted that Roberts had "endeavored to follow it faithfully." The result, he argued, was that the court-martial became "an anticlimax" as it repeated Queeg's visible collapse seen in the typhoon but still considered the core of the film "smartly and stingingly played" and "though somewhat garbled" was still "a vibrant film."

On the review aggregator website Rotten Tomatoes, 95% of 41 critics' reviews are positive, with an average rating of 8.1/10. The website's consensus reads: "Humphrey Bogart is superb as a domineering captain with brittle composure in The Caine Mutiny, an inquisitive courtroom drama teeming with memorable performances."

The February 2020 issue of New York Magazine lists The Caine Mutiny as among "The Best Movies That Lost Best Picture at the Oscars."

=== Awards and nominations ===
Award	Category	Nominee(s)	Result	Ref.
Academy Awards	Best Motion Picture	Stanley Kramer	Nominated	
Academy Awards	Best Actor	Humphrey Bogart	Nominated	
Academy Awards	Best Supporting Actor	Tom Tully	Nominated	
Academy Awards	Best Screenplay	Stanley Roberts	Nominated	
Academy Awards	Best Film Editing	William Lyon and Henry Batista	Nominated	
Academy Awards	Best Music Score of a Dramatic or Comedy Picture	Max Steiner	Nominated	
Academy Awards	Best Sound Recording	John P. Livadary	Nominated	
British Academy Film Awards	Best Film from any Source		Nominated	
British Academy Film Awards	Best Foreign Actor	José Ferrer	Nominated	
Directors Guild of America Awards	Outstanding Directorial Achievement in Motion Pictures	Edward Dmytryk	Nominated	
New York Film Critics Circle Awards	Best Director	Edward Dmytryk	Nominated	
New York Film Critics Circle Awards	Best Actor	Humphrey Bogart	Nominated	
Venice International Film Festival	Golden Lion	Edward Dmytryk	Nominated	

American Film Institute Lists

- AFI's 100 Years...100 Movies – Nominated
- AFI's 100 Years...100 Heroes and Villains:
  - Lt. Commander Philip Francis Queeg – Nominated Villain
- AFI's 100 Years...100 Movie Quotes:
  - "Ah, but the strawberries! That's--that's where I had them." – Nominated
- AFI's 10 Top 10 – Nominated Courtroom Drama

== Legacy ==
In his book American Literature on Stage and Film, historian Thomas S. Hischak says that Dmytryk handled both the action sequences and character portrayals deftly, and calls Queeg's breakdown during the trial "the stuff of movie legend."

The film and novel influenced the drafters of the 25th Article Of Amendment to the U.S. Constitution, which set forth conditions for removing the President of the United States. John D. Feerick, former dean of Fordham University School of Law, who assisted in drafting the amendment, told The Washington Post in 2018 that the film was a "live depiction" of the type of crisis that could arise "if a president ever faced questions about physical or mental inabilities but disagreed completely with the judgment", which was not dealt with in the Constitution. Lawmakers and lawyers drafting the amendment wanted no such "Article 184 situation" as depicted in the film, in which the Vice President of the U.S. or others could topple the President by merely saying that the President was "disabled".

=== Cultural influence ===
When Michael Caine, born Maurice Micklewhite, first became an actor he adopted the stage name "Michael White". He was later told by his agent that another actor was already using the same name, and that he had to come up with a new one immediately. Speaking to his agent from a telephone box in Leicester Square in London, he looked around for inspiration. Being a fan of Bogart, he noted that The Caine Mutiny was being shown at the Odeon Cinema, and adopted a new name from the movie title. Caine has often joked in interviews that, had he looked the other way, he would have ended up as "Michael One Hundred and One Dalmatians".

Vince Gilligan used a clip of the film in a Breaking Bad episode titled "Madrigal", originally transmitted in 2012, and has stated that The Caine Mutiny was one of his favorite movies as a child. The final scene of "Chicanery", an episode of the Breaking Bad spinoff series Better Call Saul, is an homage to the film's climactic courtroom scene.

In Terminator: The Sarah Connor Chronicles, members of the human resistance serve aboard the submarine USS Jimmy Carter piloted by a reprogrammed Terminator that has been named "Queeg" by the crew.

In the Star Trek episode "The Doomsday Machine", the obsessive Commodore Matt Decker, portrayed by William Windom, fusses constantly with two futuristic tape cartridges, much as Captain Queeg rubs together two bearing balls. Windom publicly acknowledged that Decker's behavior was based on Queeg's.

== See also ==
- List of American films of 1954
- Trial movies
- Typhoon Cobra (1944), the violent storm that inspired the one in the film.
- USS Somers (1842), only mutiny in U.S. Navy history which led to executions.
- The Caine Mutiny Court-Martial, a second film released in 2023, based on Wouk's stage script
