= USS Thompson (DD-627) =

Gleaves-class destroyer

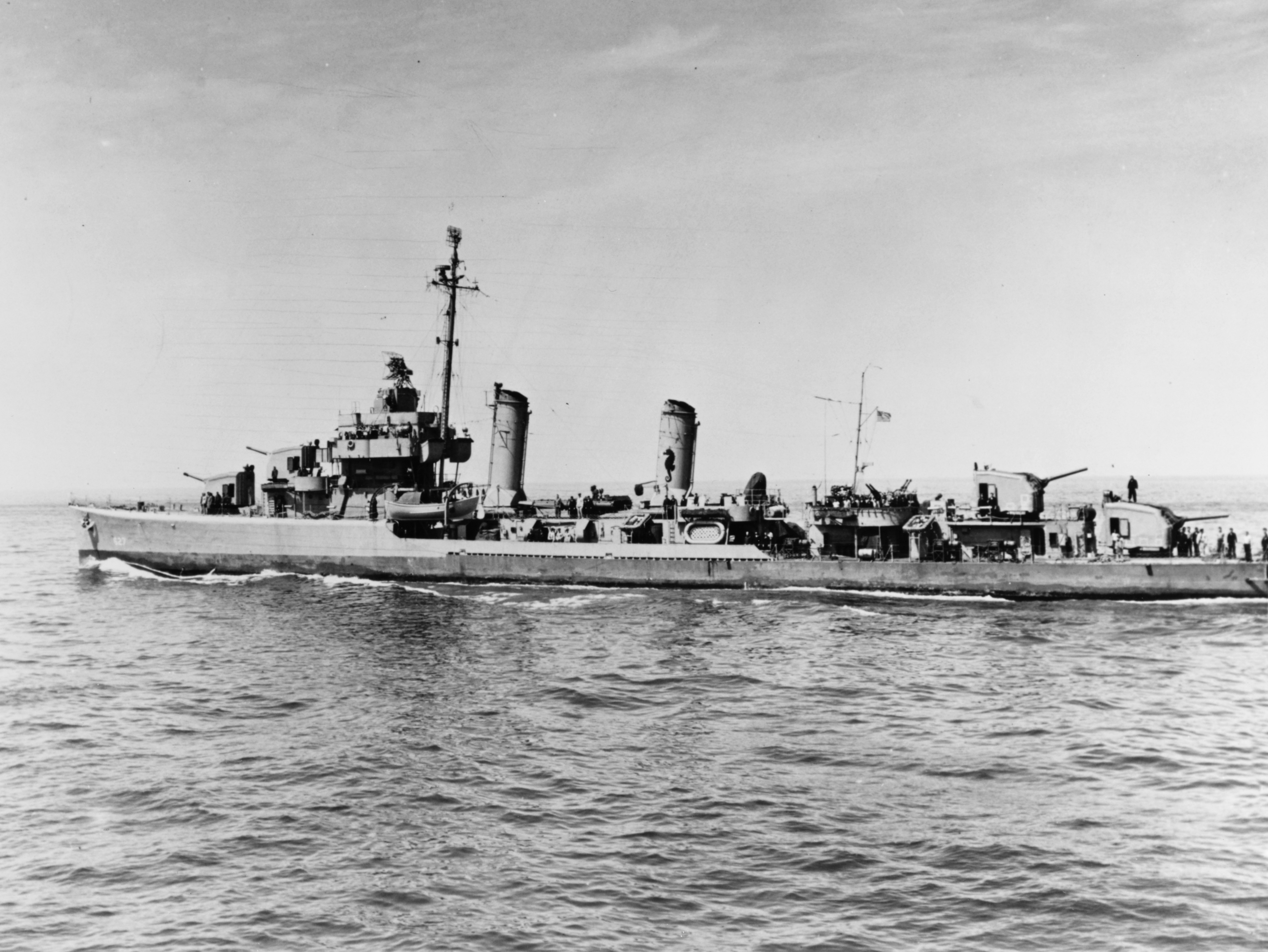
- Thompson in May 1944

History
- Name: Thompson
- Namesake: Robert Means Thompson
- Builder: Seattle-Tacoma Shipbuilding Corporation
- Laid down: 22 September 1941
- Launched: 15 July 1942
- Commissioned: 10 July 1943
- Reclassified: DMS-38, 30 May 1945
- Decommissioned: 18 May 1954
- Stricken: 1 July 1971
- Fate: Sold for scrap, 7 August 1972

General characteristics
- Class & type: Gleaves-class destroyer
- Displacement: 1,630 tons
- Length: 348 ft 3 in (106.15 m)
- Beam: 36 ft 1 in (11.00 m)
- Draft: 11 ft 10 in (3.61 m)
- Propulsion: 50,000 shp (37 MW); 4 boilers; 2 propellers
- Speed: 37.4 knots (69 km/h)
- Range: 6,500 nautical miles at 12 kt; (12,000 km at 22 km/h)
- Complement: 16 officers, 260 enlisted
- Armament: 4 × 5 in (127 mm)/38 caliber DP guns; 4 × 40 mm (2×2) and 7 × 20 mm (5×1) AA guns, 5× 21 in (53 cm) torpedo tubes (1x5; 5 Mark 15 torpedoes); 6 × depth charge projectors, 2 × depth charge tracks

USS Thompson (DD-627) (later DMS-38) was first a Gleaves-class destroyer, then became an Ellyson-class destroyer minesweeper. She was the second Navy ship named "Thompson", and the first named in honor of Robert M. Thompson.

== World War II ==
The keel of the second Thompson was laid down on 22 September 1941, at Seattle, Washington, by the Seattle-Tacoma Shipbuilding Corporation. She was launched on 15 July 1942, sponsored by Miss Sara Thompson Ross, and commissioned on 10 July 1943.

Following operations along the west coast, Thompson departed San Diego, on 19 August, bound for the east coast. She arrived at Norfolk, Virginia on 1 September, prior to departing the next day for the coast of Maine and arriving at Casco Bay on 3 September. The destroyer then headed south to the Boston Navy Yard where she underwent repairs. She next engaged in exercises off the Massachusetts coast before returning to Casco Bay on 23 September for training.

On 5 October, she escorted Arkansas into New York and joined the screen for Texas for nine days of exercises in shore bombardment and other drills before joining convoy UGS-21 which sailed from Norfolk, bound for North Africa. Thompson served as an escort, keeping ships in the channel as they plodded out to sea and prodding them to close up and keep in formation, while her echo-ranging gear was alert for prowling submarines off Chesapeake Bay. One day out, 16 October, (UGS.21 sailed from Hampton Roads on 5 November, and therefore I believe this to be 6 November) the wind and sea rose, presaging a heavy storm which served to scatter parts of the convoy and cause Thompson to note in her log numerous times, "telling stragglers to close up." After the transatlantic voyage, Thompson was released from escort duty on 31 October, to proceed to Casablanca, French Morocco.

One week later, the destroyer, attached to DesDiv 36, was homeward-bound with Convoy GUS-20. On 24 November, Thompson entered New York harbor with the convoy and then proceeded independently to the New York Navy Yard for voyage repairs. She sailed for Casco Bay on 5 December, and conducted refresher training en route.

On 7 December, Thompson and Baldwin screened New Jersey as the battleship conducted high-speed runs and turning trials. Later that day, the three ships engaged in night illumination and spotting practice before carrying out the same program on 8 December.

After returning to Casco Bay, Thompson again put to sea, bound for Norfolk. During the night of 10 December, the winds increased to 70 knots (130 km/h) with high seas and a low barometer. By 07:35, it became necessary to rig in her already battered whaleboats and reduce speed to 12 knots (22 km/h).

Thompson put into Norfolk on 12 December. Two days later she joined Convoy UGS-27, bound for North Africa. On 27 December, she made a depth charge run on what her log termed "a questionable target".

Entering Casablanca harbor on 3 January 1944, Thompson and her fellow escorts were soon assigned to Convoy GUS-27, bound for Norfolk, where they arrived on 24 January. After alternating between New York, Boston, and Casco Bay, she departed Norfolk on 18 March, bound for Trinidad.

=== Invasion of Normandy, April–July 1944 ===
Returning to Norfolk six days later, Thompson operated along the east coast until mid-April when she joined the build-up of forces for the invasion of western Europe. On 18 April, she rendezvoused with Baldwin, Arkansas, Tuscaloosa, Nevada, and the rest of Destroyer Squadron 18 (DesRon18) – to which Thompson was attached – and sailed for England. This force arrived at Plymouth, England, on 28 April, and prepared for duties during the forthcoming invasion.

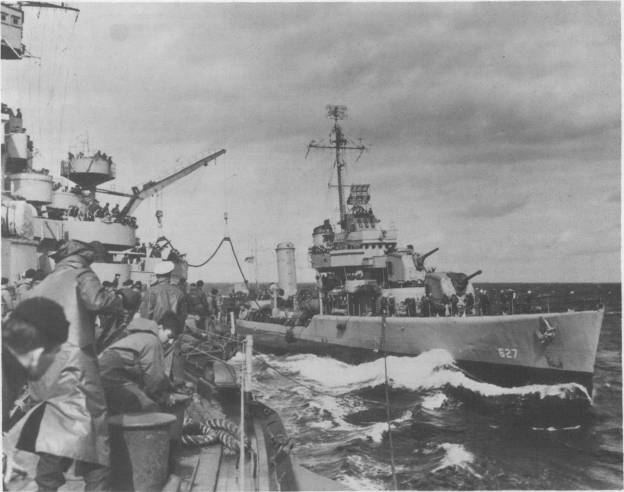
Thompson refueling from USS Arkansas, in April 1944.

On 4 May 1944, Thompson participated in landing exercise "Fabius", one of the many preliminaries to the landing on Normandy. On 9 May, she conducted shore bombardment practice at Slapton Sands, England; on 13 May, she fired antiaircraft practice off Ailsa Craig, Scotland, and, on 16 May, she engaged in division tactics and further bombardment exercises off the Irish coast.

On 15 April, she anchored at Belfast Lough, Northern Ireland. The following day, 16 April, Nevada, Texas, and Destroyer Division 36 (DesDiv 36) departed for exercises off the Irish coast before returning to Belfast Lough. Three days later, on 19 April, General Dwight D. Eisenhower inspected the ship. Underway on 20 April, she conducted anti-E-boat exercises through 22 April. In these operations, she fired star shells and practiced illumination tactics for dealing with the foreseen danger of Schnellbooten. After more shore bombardment practice, in which her five-inch and Bofors gunners exercised at their battle stations and sharpened up their gunnery, she put out of Belfast Lough for Plymouth and thence proceeded to the Isle of Portland, where she arrived on 27 April.

The next day, German Heinkel He 111s bombed and mined the harbor, causing no small amount of work for harried minesweeper crews. But, with this danger soon swept away, the Allied forces could resume the nearly complete preparations for the upcoming Normandy invasion.

On 5 June, she joined Task Group 124.7 (TG124.7), Convoy O-1, bound for Omaha Beach. She and her charges arrived off the Normandy beaches after an uneventful, but storm-tossed, evening. Thompson then received her fire support orders to take station off Pointe de la Percée as a unit of TG124.9. En route, she stood to action stations, her guns trained out and ready for any eventuality as the drama of history's greatest landing operation unfolded around her.

She arrived off Pointe du Hoc as Army rangers were struggling to gain a foothold on the rocky promontory. Thompson's spotters could not see much at that moment, as Army aerial bombardments had obscured the area with smoke and dust. But when the haze cleared away, the destroyer's main battery opened fire with a vengeance, tongues of flame flashing from her gun muzzles as her salvos screamed shoreward. One by one, her targets of opportunity disappeared as her salvos struck "on target." She then lay-to awaiting remaining enemy guns to reveal themselves with tell-tale flashes.

Later in the day, she cruised closer inshore and located three giant German Würzburg radar antennas. Once again, her spotting was deadly accurate, and one of the radar "dishes" toppled over, shattered by Thompson's shells. Soon after, the wreckage of the two other antennas joined the first one in the dust.

Thompson's smaller guns also got into the fray. Her 40 mm batteries shredded concealments of shore batteries and sniper nests, working in close conjunction with shore spotting teams who ferreted out the hidden enemy. Among her other targets was a fortified house. Solidly constructed, it had withstood numerous coastal storms. But on 6 June 1944, its solid Norman masonry could not hold up to a few rounds of five-inch (127 mm) high explosives; and down it tumbled, into a pile of rubble.

The following day, 7 June, Thompson's gunners were at it again – this time, in support of the Rangers at Point du Hoc. Once more, her 40 mm and five-inch (127 mm) batteries shot the enemy out of his sniper nests and gun positions before setting course for Portland, to anchor in Weymouth Bay to replenish her depleted fuel and ammunition stocks.

On 8 June, Thompson and her companion Satterlee (DD-626) steamed back to Omaha beach. On the evening of 9 June, the Germans struck back in a stealthy E-boat attack. Thompson, screening as part of the Allied naval craft gathered there, joined in commencing fire on the intruders who were successfully driven off, retiring to the northward at high speed. On 10 June, her 20 mm and 40 mm gunners splashed a low-flying German "snooper" airplane.

At 01:00 on 11 June, another E-boat attack developed from the northward. Here, as before, the long hours spent in night illumination and spotting practice exercises paid off handsome dividends. Thompson fired star shells, which revealed the shadowy E-boats. British steam gun boats Grey Wolf (SGB-8) and Grey Goose (SGB-9) then darted in to ward off the intruders under the watchful eye of the destroyermen.

On 12 June, Thompson embarked a party (which included Admiral Ernest J. King and Generals Dwight D. Eisenhower, George C. Marshall, and Henry H. Arnold) and transported them across the channel to the invasion beaches at Omaha and then returned to Plymouth with Admiral King and his party embarked. A motor launch with the officers mentioned above was launched to bring them in. An unknown ship was ahead of the motor launch and struck a mine.

Thompson continued to operate off Normandy beaches throughout the remainder of June 1944, steaming often between the Baie de la Seine, and Plymouth, England. On one occasion, she served as the flagship of Rear Admiral Alan G. Kirk, Naval Commander, Western Task Forces, for a quick visit to Cherbourg; on another, she once more served as a transport for General Eisenhower.

On 24 July 1944, Thompson steamed for North Africa, transiting the Straits of Gibraltar and arriving at Bizerte four days later. Underway in company with the rest of Destroyer Division 36 (DesDiv36) on the 29th, she left Bizerte bound for Oran, Algeria, arriving on 30 July. Thompson reached Naples on 6 August and joined the Allied expeditionary forces amassing for Operation Dragoon, the invasion of southern France. Underway with Convoy SF-1, bound for the assault area, Thompson served in the screen and patrolled offshore throughout the operation from 15 to 21 August.

After a brief tender availability from 28 August to 1 September, she returned to the southern France beachheads to continue patrols through 18 September before steaming to Mers-El-Kebir, Morocco, where she arrived four days later, on 22 September. On 23 September she departed Mers-El-Kebir and headed for the United States. Arriving at Bermuda on 1 October, she commenced Navy Yard availability on 3 October, which lasted through 27 October of that month. For the remainder of 1944, Thompson operated off the east coast of the United States.

On 3 January 1945, the destroyer joined Convoy UGS-86, bound for North African ports. Entering Mers-El-Kebir on 20 January, she remained in North African waters until 1 February, when she joined the screen of Convoy GUS-68, en route to the United States. Arriving off New York on 13 February, the New York section of the convoy was detached. Thompson continued on with the Boston section, where she commenced a 10-day availability at the Boston Navy Yard on 15 February.

Following these repairs, she steamed to Norfolk, Virginia, conducting gunnery exercises en route. On 1 March, she sortied with Convoy UGF-21, bound for North Africa, and arrived in North African waters on 12 March. The following month, after returning to the United States, she again escorted a North African convoy, this time UGS-85, commencing on 7 April.

On 30 May, Thompson was reclassified as a fast minesweeper and given hull classification symbol DMS-38. She spent the month of June undergoing conversion for her new mission, commencing on 5 June. She completed her yard work on 29 June. During a post-conversion period, she conducted her first minesweeping exercises, with magnetic sweep equipment, in Chesapeake Bay. She also calibrated her radar, conducted antiaircraft exercises, and practiced laying mines. On 1 August, she departed the Virginia Capes and steamed toward the Panama Canal Zone, where she arrived on 7 August. While underway on 14 August, she received the news Japan had surrendered. On 18 August, she arrived at San Diego.

== Post World War II ==
During September, Thompson moved westward, stopping at Pearl Harbor on 8 September and Eniwetok on 21 September. Arriving at Buckner Bay on 28 September, she put in just in time to take on fuel and head out to sea as a typhoon swirled north. Shortly after the ship returned to Buckner Bay, yet another typhoon warning scrambled the Fleet and set it seaward into the East China Sea once more. On 9 October, the center of Typhoon Louise smashed through Okinawa, but Thompson was well-clear and suffered no damage. She and her sister-ships in Mine Division 61 (MineDiv 61), formed a scouting line four miles (6 km) apart on 10 October, keeping careful lookout while returning to Buckner Bay, searching for life rafts, derelicts, or men in the water.

On 16 October, Thompson, in company with MineDiv61, headed to sea from Buckner Bay to commence sweeping operations in area "Rickshaw" in the Yellow Sea. En route the following day, Thompson sighted several floating mines and destroyed them by gunfire.

On 19 October, the force arrived at "Rickshaw," joined by PGM-29, PGM-30, and PGM-31. Thompson began her initial actual minesweeping at the northeast end of known mine lanes. The following day, Thompson swept her first mine – the first one swept by the task group. By 17 November, "Rickshaw" had been swept clean of Japanese mines, with Thompson scoring high with 64 mines located and destroyed.

After a short tender availability at Sasebo, Japan, the base of operations for MineDiv 61, Thompson steamed to Nagoya, Japan, to become flagship of the task group sweeping nearby waters. Completing this operation by mid-December, the minesweeper steamed back via Wakayama to Sasebo. During the last week in 1945, she assisted in the unsuccessful search for survivors of Minivet (AM-371), sunk by a mine explosion off Tsushima, northwest of Kyūshū, Japan.

The ship spent January and February 1946 in Japanese home waters, and then steamed for Bikini Atoll to assist in sweeping operations to prepare the area for Operation Crossroads tests of atomic bombs to be conducted there in July. Before the tests took place, Thompson headed back to the United States. She remained at San Francisco, through July and then spent two months in overhaul at the Mare Island Naval Shipyard, Vallejo, California. From Mare Island, she returned to San Francisco to operate out of that port until late in the year. After six months of operation at San Francisco, she sailed for China on 10 February 1947, and proceeded via Pearl Harbor, Guam, and Kwajalein to Tsingtao.

Following six months duty with American occupation forces in Chinese waters, Thompson returned to the United States in early September 1947 and arrived at San Diego, California, on 2 October. Transferred to the operational command of Destroyers, Pacific Fleet, with the abolition of the Pacific Fleet Minecraft command, Thompson operated out of San Diego as a destroyer until 29 April 1948, when she returned again to Mare Island for a two-month overhaul. In July, she returned to San Diego and underwent training operations off the west coast, activities in which she was engaged for the remainder of 1948.

In January 1949, Thompson again set course for China in company with Destroyer Division 52. En route, however, the ships received orders to put about for the west coast after spending a few days in Hawaii, arriving at San Diego on 4 February 1949.

Thompson and three of her sister fast-minesweepers then became Mine Squadron One (MineRon 1) and were assigned to the General Line School at Monterey, California. They alternated in these operations between Monterey and San Diego for the remainder of 1949. After spending the first three months of 1950 in routine exercises and cruises out of San Diego, Thompson steamed for Pearl Harbor on 6 April 1950, for a three-month overhaul.

== Korean War ==
While in the yard, she received news that North Korean armed forces had invaded South Korea crossing the 38th parallel. Completing her overhaul ahead of schedule, Thompson returned to San Diego on 20 July and began an accelerated and rigorous underway training period which lasted through August and part of September 1950.

On 4 October 1950, Thompson and sister ship Carmick (DD-493) departed San Diego, and arrived at Pearl Harbor five days later. The next day, they got underway for Midway Atoll. Twenty-four hours from their destination, orders directed them to patrol off Wake Island during the meeting of General Douglas MacArthur and President Harry Truman. Thompson remained there overnight, refueling at sea from Guadalupe (AO-32) before proceeding to Japan, arriving at Sasebo on 21 October.

While Thompson and Carmick had steamed across the Pacific, United Nations forces had been rallying after the initial heavy losses and retreats at the hands of the communist armies. Accordingly, the American Eighth Army put heavy pressure on North Korean troops, pushing them towards P'yŏngyang, on the west coast of Korea. This thrust was stretching the Army's supply lanes. To remedy this problem, an operation was mounted to open up the mined port of Chinnampo, some 50 km southwest of P'yŏngyang, at the mouth of the Taedong River.

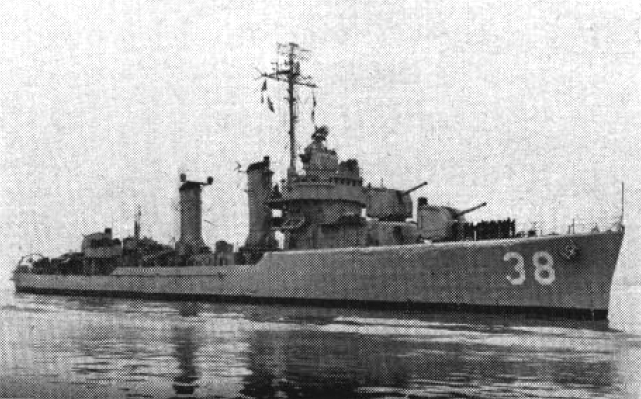
Thompson as DMS-38 during the Korean War

This required ingenuity and resourcefulness, not least because of a lack of minesweeping craft at the start of operations. Thompson and Carmick, newly arrived in the "Land of the Morning Calm", were detailed to join the makeshift minesweeping organization recently established under Commander Stephen M. Archer. Consisting of Forrest Royal (DD-872), Catamount (LSD-17), Horace A. Bass (APD-124), Pelican (AMS-32), Swallow (AMS-36), and Gull (AMS-16), Japanese LST Q-007, four Republic of Korea minesweepers, and a helicopter from Rochester (CA-124), this task group performed a nearly impossible feat in slightly over two weeks. Before too long, American ships were bringing in supplies to the advancing Eighth Army. After a week of patrol duties off the newly swept port escorting logistics ships now able to utilize the channel, Thompson left the bitterly cold region behind for a week of repairs and resupply at Sasebo.

In early November, however, the entry of Chinese communist forces into the war vastly altered the strategic picture. In the face of heavy onslaughts, United Nations troops retreated. One port which served as an evacuation point was Chinnampo, familiar to Thompson's men as a result of the minesweeping operation conducted a scant month before.

While United Nations warships conducted bombardments of advancing communist troops, Thompson escorted troopships out of the harbor in dense fog and through treacherous tidal currents to assist in the evacuation. For her part in this action, Thompson received the Navy Unit Commendation.

After replenishment, she served as harbor control vessel at Incheon, Korea. Two days after Christmas, she suddenly received orders to head for Sasebo, where MineRon 1 was to be regrouped. Arriving at the Japanese port on 27 December, she departed on 30 December 1950, in company with Doyle (DMS-34) and Endicott (DMS-35) for minesweeping assignments on the east coast of Korea. There, she spent close to three weeks engaged in clearance sweeps so that support ships could take fire-support stations to assist ground forces ashore.

In late January 1951, after a month in the arduous and cold conditions of that region, Thompson returned to Sasebo for repairs. These included drydocking for work on the hull, and, as a result of the docking period, the availability was extended another three weeks, before she departed for minesweeping operations again in mid-February.

Using Wonsan as a base, she operated to the northward, eventually sweeping Kyoto Wan deep, 60 miles (97 km) south of the Manchurian border. While sweeping off the key railway nexus of Sŏngjin, Thompson ran across a new minefield and cut seven mines as she passed through on her sweep. Later, she operated in the screen for Missouri (BB-63) and Manchester (CL-83), while they operated in that area on shore bombardment duties.

At Chuuron Jang, she herself destroyed two railroad bridges with her pinpoint gunnery. Also during this period, she took part in "junk-busting" operations up and down the coast, being on the lookout for suspicious junks used by communist forces for infiltration and minelaying operations. On one occasion, while underway north of Sŏngjin, she sighted six North Korean junks in a cove. Once again, as at the Normandy "D-day" landings, Thompson's gunners opened fire with a vengeance and sank all six communist boats.

After a month of such operations, she returned to Sasebo for upkeep. From 1 April 1951 to 3 November, Thompson returned to shell communist defense positions, supply lines, and troop concentrations. On 14 June, however, it was the enemy's turn to hit back. Thompson's gunners had just completed the destruction of a railroad bridge near Sŏngjin when communist shore batteries opened fire, soon straddling the ship. One shell struck the bridge and knocked out the ship's fire control gear. In retaliation, Thompson's gunners destroyed one enemy battery and damaged another. With three dead and three wounded, Thompson retired.

On 3 November 1951, Thompson departed from Korean waters, homeward bound. She steamed into San Diego Bay on 20 November and thence proceeded to the Mare Island Naval Shipyard for overhaul. After post-repair trials, she conducted operations on the west coast and underwent a restricted availability at Long Beach, California. Thompson spent the remainder of 1951 and the first part of 1952 in continental United States waters before departing San Diego on 23 June 1952.

Arriving at Pearl Harbor six days later, she continued on to Yokosuka, where she arrived on 18 July. After a short availability alongside destroyer tender Frontier (AD-25), Thompson proceeded to Sŏngjin, arriving off that port on 11 August 1952.

In contrast to her earlier Korean tours, when her minesweeping duties were intermingled with destroyer-type operations, Thompson was now free to operate as a destroyer for coast patrol and gunfire support duties. Sweeping was now done by AMs and AMSs and was all done at night.

The communists, too, had changed tactics. More guns were brought in to defend the coasts, while enemy accuracy had improved as well. On 20 August 1952, once more off Sŏngjin, Thompson was taken under fire by a Chinese battery. A shell hit the flying bridge, killing four and wounding nine. Thompson attempted to return the fire, but the excellently concealed shore guns made the return shelling's accuracy difficult and ineffective. Retiring from the scene, the stricken Thompson transferred her casualties to Iowa (BB-61), then operating 16 miles (30 km) south of Sŏngjin.

Five days later, the minesweeper arrived at Sasebo on 26 August for tender availability, repairing her engines and battle damage, before she headed north to Sŏngjin. She remained off this unlucky port from 13 September to 12 October 1952, occasionally patrolling to the northernmost extremity of the United Nations blockade before again returning to Sasebo.

From 3 November to 1 December 1952, Thompson operated in Wonsan harbor, as part of the United Nations blockade forces there. As such, she was in range of communist guns on many occasions. The object of enemy fire at least four times, Thompson received damage for the third time when straddled on 20 November 1952, while acting as gunfire support ship for Kite (AMS-22) which was conducting a sweep of the inner harbor. From three widely spaced points enemy guns took the minesweepers under fire, catching Thompson amidships on the starboard side as she was laying clouds of oily black smoke between Kite and the shoreline.

Returning to Yokosuka for repairs to the battle damage, Thompson spent Christmas in that Japanese naval port. New Year's, however, once again found the fast minesweeper at Sŏngjin. After two more tours there, into February 1953, Thompson headed back to the United States in company with Carmick. With refueling stops at Midway and Pearl Harbor, she finally arrived at San Diego on 14 March 1953.

== Post Korean War ==
Operating with MineDiv 11, Thompson was based on the west coast for the remainder of the year. Beginning on 8 June 1953, she played the title role in Columbia Pictures's "The Caine Mutiny", the 1954 film adaptation of the Herman Wouk novel of the same name. Operating out of San Francisco for one week, Thompson became the Caine, while serving as the model for many of the Columbia sets used in the filming of the on-board scenes.

After taking part in two exercises in late September 1953, she operated out of San Diego until 1 December 1953, when she reported to the Pacific Reserve Fleet to prepare for inactivation. On 18 May 1954, Thompson's commission pennant was hauled down and the ship placed in reserve. On 16 July 1956, she was reclassified as a destroyer and redesignated DD-627.

She was struck from the Naval Vessel Register on 1 July 1971, and sold to the American Ship Dismantlers of Portland, Oregon, on 7 August 1972, for scrapping.

== Awards ==
- Navy Unit Commendation
- European-African-Middle Eastern Campaign Medal with two battle stars
- World War II Victory Medal
- Navy Occupation Medal with "ASIA" clasp
- China Service Medal
- National Defense Service Medal
- Korean Service Medal with seven battle stars
- Korean Presidential Unit Citation
- United Nations Service Medal
