= Destroyer minesweeper =

US Navy WWII type of ship

Destroyer minesweeper was a designation given by the United States Navy to a series of destroyers that were converted into high-speed ocean-going minesweepers for service during World War II. The hull classification symbol for this type of ship was "DMS." Forty-two ships were so converted, beginning with USS Dorsey (DD-117), converted to DMS-1 in late 1940, and ending with USS Earle (DD-635), converted to DMS-42 in mid-1945. The type is now obsolete, its function having been taken over by purpose-built ships, designated as "minesweeper (high-speed)" with the hull classification symbol MMD.

The Clemson-class destroyers and Wickes-class destroyers chosen for conversion were obsolete four-stack destroyers built in 1918 that still had usable power plants; they were nicknamed "four-pipers" on account of their four smokestacks. Although the full conversion process to minesweepers for the original 17 Wickes and Clemson-class destroyers began in October—November 1940, it was not completed for all 17 until around mid-1942. When they were fully converted from destroyers to destroyer minesweepers, the number 4 boiler, the fourth stack from the bow, and the torpedo tubes were removed, the depth charge racks repositioned forward from the stern and angled outboard, and the stern modified to support sweep gear: davits, winch, paravanes, and kites. Two 60-kilowatt turbo-generators replaced the three original 25-kilowatt generators to improve capability for sweeping magnetic and acoustic mines.

The majority of mines left by the Japanese in the Pacific were contact mines which were usually moored and could be removed by a paravane. The Japanese never created their own magnetic or pressure mines, though they captured a very limited number of magnetic mines from the British, which they laid off Balikpapan in 1945. Magnetic mines in the European theater were usually disabled by towing a magnetized cable, often swept by wooden-hulled ships, but occasionally swept by iron-clad ships that were degaussed to mask their magnetic properties. Minesweeping in the Pacific theater in World War II consisted primarily in the use of sweep wires suspended between paravanes and kites, particularly among destroyer minesweepers.

== Wickes-class minesweepers ==
Conversion of the initial seventeen ships, begun in October and November 1940, included eight Wickes-class and nine Clemson-class destroyers. Following are the Wickes-class destroyers that were converted to minesweepers and subsequently designated DMS-1 to DMS-8:

- USS Dorsey (DMS-1)(DD-117)
- USS Lamberton (DMS-2)(DD-119)
- USS Boggs (DMS-3)(DD-136)
- USS Elliot (DMS-4)(DD-146)
- USS Palmer (DMS-5)(DD-161)
- USS Hogan (DMS-6)(DD-178)
- USS Howard (DMS-7)(DD-179)
- USS Stansbury (DMS-8)(DD–180)
- USS Hamilton (DMS-18)(DD-141)(Converted later in 1941)

== Clemson-class minesweepers ==
In 1941 ten more destroyers were converted, and designated DMS-9 to DMS-18. This time nine were Clemson-class ships and only DM-18 came from the Wickes class.

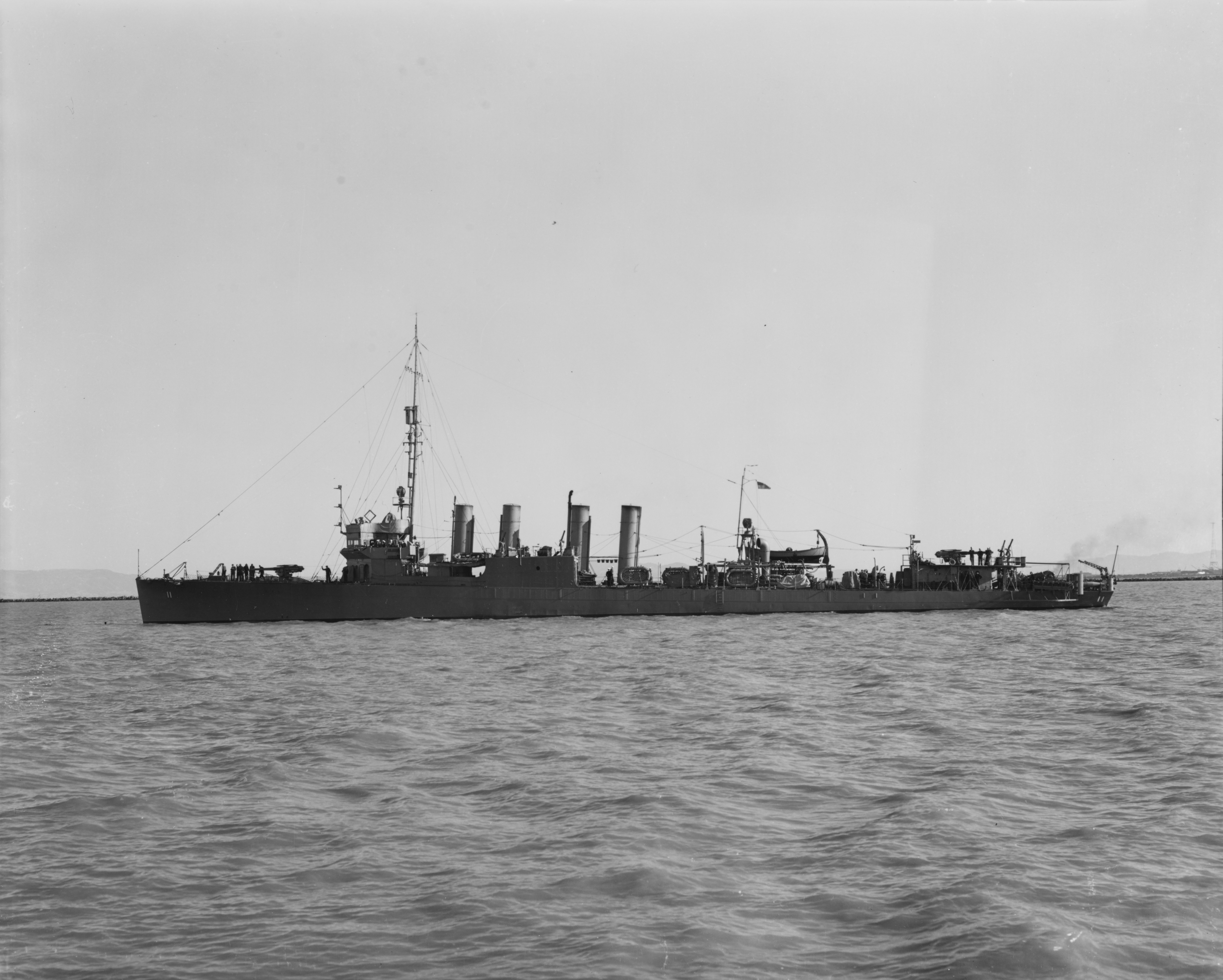
Minesweeper USS Hovey, June 1942, pre-conversion, 4 smokestacks, and 4" guns front and rear, around 8 x 50 cal AA guns

The Clemson-class destroyer USS Hovey, is shown at right, not fully converted, in June 1942, still with four smokestacks. The fully converted USS Hovey is shown below right, with three smokestacks, a squared off stern with two cranes visible for hauling minesweeping gear, and three guns visible fore, midship, and one on the aft deckhouse.

The nine converted Clemson-class destroyers and one Wickes-class destroyer completed by November 1940 are listed below:

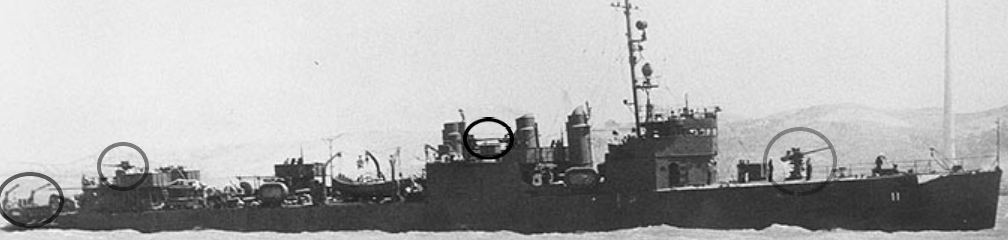
Converted USS Hovey (DMS11) at Mare Island, May 1943, with three smokestacks. Shown circled from left to right are squared stern with cranes or davits to haul minesweeping gear, and guns visible aft, midship and forward AA gun

- USS Chandler (DMS-9) (DD-206)
- USS Southard (DMS-10) (DD-207)
- USS Hovey (DMS-11)(DD-208)
- USS Long (DMS-12)(DD-209)
- USS Hopkins (DMS-13)(DD-249)
- USS Zane (DMS-14)(DD-337)
- USS Wasmuth (DMS-15)(DD-338)
- USS Trever (DMS-16)(DD-339)
- USS Perry (DMS-17)(DD-340)

At first the ships above retained their initial four 4 inch guns for defense. In 1942 they were scheduled to get 3"/50 caliber dual purpose guns as they needed to be prepared to face air attack in WWII. By 1944, their armament included two or three 3"/50 caliber dual purpose guns and twin power operated Bofors guns, which were highly effective against enemy aircraft. Their dual purpose 3 inch guns could be used against enemy shore batteries, to fire on surfaced submarines, and as effective anti-aircraft weapons. The destroyer minesweepers usually lost all four of their original four 4 inch guns when they received their 3"/50 caliber and Bofors guns, but they retained a significantly improved capability against Japanese enemy aircraft including kamikazes which many of these ships faced between January and May 1945.

== Fates of WWII destroyer minesweepers ==
The USS Wasmuth, after spending much of her WWII career sweeping and escorting ships in the Aleutians, was sunk when a gale in Alaskan waters dislodged two of her depth charges that exploded by her hull in December 1942. The threat of a depth charge dislodging and exploding during a storm was a topic covered by Herman Wouk in the climax to his novel The Caine Mutiny. The executive officer Steve Maryk urged Captain Queeg to set the depth charges on destroyer minesweeper Caine on "safe" during a storm, though Queeg was enraged when he discovered this had been done earlier without his knowledge or permission.

The Perry, a Wickes-class destroyer in the list above, was sunk by naval mines on September 13, 1944, off Palau while she was involved in sweeping duties. Records indicate she may have been the only destroyer minesweeper sunk by a naval mine while sweeping in WWII. The Wickes-class minesweeper Dorsey had to be destroyed after she ran aground off Okinawa from Typhoon Louise in October 1945, and the Wickes-class Lamberton was run aground with minor damage in the same storm. In the Battle of Lingayen Gulf, from January 3–7, 1945, three Clemson-class destroyer minesweepers listed above, the Hovey, the Long, and the Palmer, were sunk primarily by kamikazes and the Southard was lightly damaged by a kamikaze, though she later had to be destroyed after running aground at Okinawa during Typhoon Louise in October 1945. The Hopkins survived the Battle of Lingayen Gulf off Luzon unscathed, though four of the seven ships in Hopkins's minesweeping Task Force 77.6, Unit 1 were hit. The destroyer minesweeper Chandler initially rescued the survivors of minesweepers Hovey and Long as well as a few of the survivors of Clemson-class destroyer Brooks at Lingayen on January 7, 1945 and served out WWII without damage from combat. The Dorsey, the Hogan, the Hamilton, and the Howard escaped damage in the Battle of Lingayen Gulf, the most dangerous battle of the war for Clemson-class destroyer minesweepers, and survived the war. Around fifty American naval vessels, five destroyer minesweepers among them, were lost or damaged at Lingayen Gulf in the first two weeks of 1945.

Full assault by Japanese torpedo planes, bombers, and kamikazes against the semi-isolated destroyer minesweepers in the difficult waters of Lingayen Gulf proved too much for their antiaircraft capabilities when isolated from the screening that could be provided by more heavily armed destroyers and battleships. As the Naval historian Samuel Eliot Morison noted with respect to the destroyer minesweepers at the Battle of Lingayen Gulf, the “Japanese seemed to pick on minecraft because they were usually isolated and had no good antiaircraft support”. Nonetheless, only one destroyer minesweeper, the highly upgraded Gleaves-class Emmons, was sunk in combat by kamikazes after Lingayen Gulf, and she was struck a remarkable total of five times at the Battle of Okinawa before sinking. The Navy itself acknowledged the daunting task faced by minesweepers in defending against enemy aircraft with relatively light armament, as the commendation for the Emmons presented by the Secretary of the Navy acknowledged that she was "lightly armed and highly vulnerable while operating in dangerous mined waters". The Emmons had significantly more anti-aircraft guns than the Wickes and Clemson-class destroyer minesweepers that battled kamikazes and Japanese escort planes at Lingayen Gulf only three months earlier.

Few destroyer minesweepers had been lost in combat prior to the Battle of Lingayen Gulf, as their primary and essential function was to sweep mines or hunt the occasional submarine, not to engage in ship to ship combat, particularly since they lacked torpedoes after their full conversion to minesweepers in 1942. Once their minesweeping duties were completed, they were usually vacated to another area, or performed escort duties protecting supply vessels from enemy aircraft and submarines. The Battle of Okinawa would prove to be even more disastrous for the destroyer minesweeper fleet than Lingayen Gulf, with roughly seven times more Japanese aircraft engaged as kamikazes.

== Minesweeping methods ==
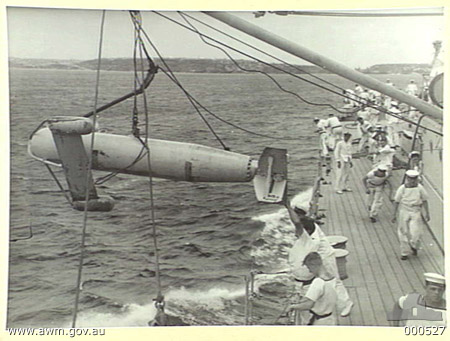
WWII paravane

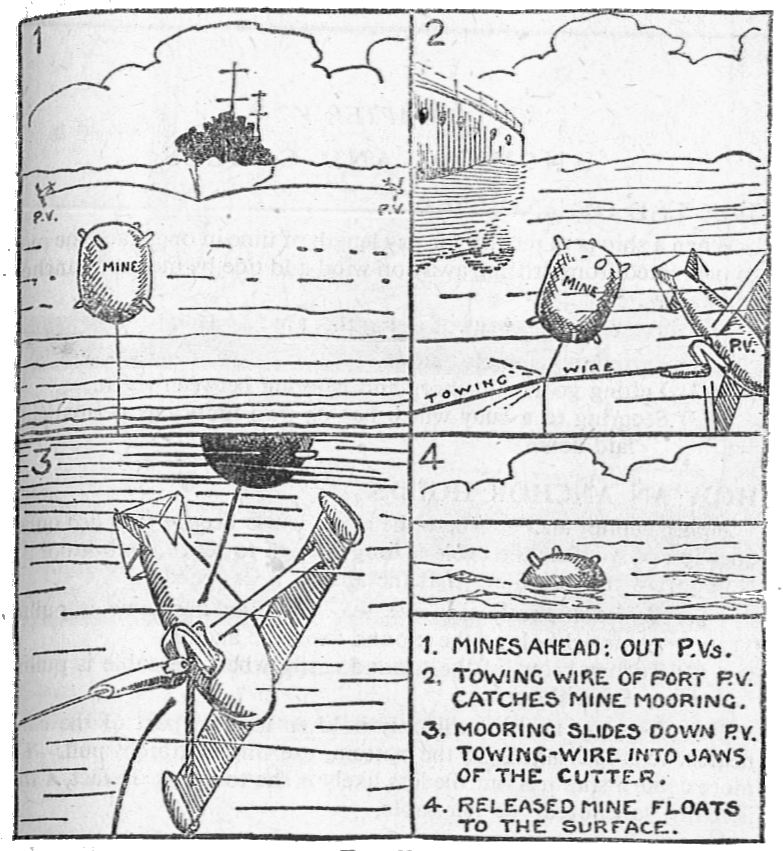
How a bow-attached paravane cuts a moored mine

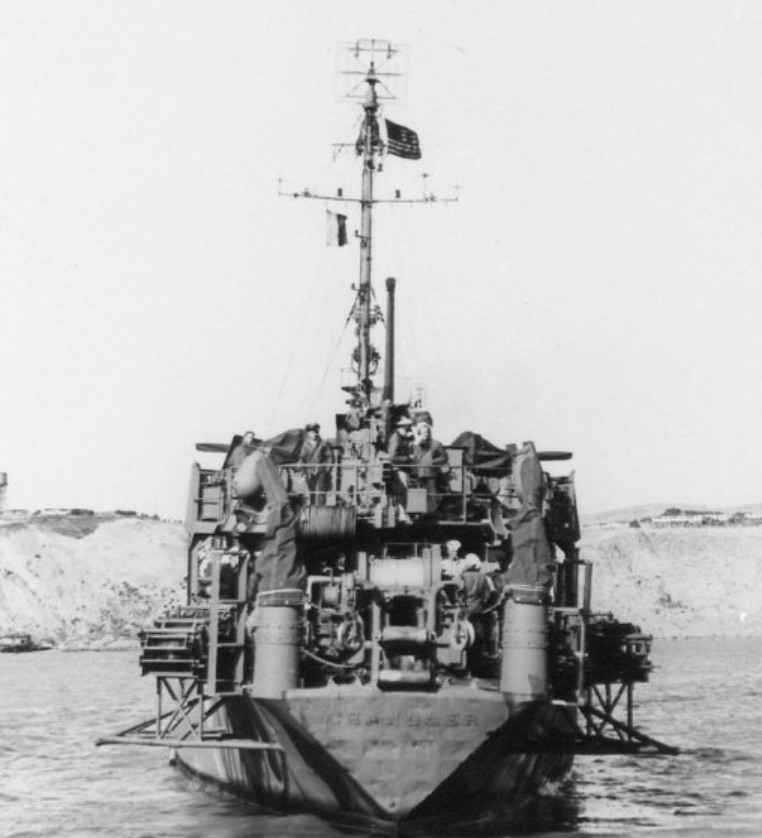
Minesweeper stern, click to view cranes (davits) on each side for towing sweep gear, winch in center

WWII Japan never developed its own magnetic or pressure mines, so for those destroyer minesweepers in the Pacific, mines were usually cut from their mooring by a paravane, shown at left, extended by a sweep line from the rear or sides of a minesweeper, assisted by the use of sonar to locate the submerged mines. Sonar could operate at a few thousand hertz to around ten thousand hertz for shallower mine location, but sonar frequencies as high as 24 thousand hertz were routinely used to track submarines at depth. WWII mine location sonar in the Pacific in WWII was one of the first true search sonars and employed frequency modulation. Its range, in perfect conditions, could not exceed 800 yards or 730 meters, which was inadequate for purposes other than locating and plotting minefields. The sonar had a Plan Position Indicator, similar to those on high quality modern radar, which showed mines as bright green "pears". The sonar also conveniently made a sound audible to the minesweeping crewman, when a mine was swept by its beam, a clear ringing note the mine crews dubbed "hell's bells."

Paravanes could be towed from one or both sides of a ship's stern, or occasionally bow, though destroyer minesweepers nearly always towed them from the stern. The sweep line caught the moored mine's cable below the surface, causing the paravane to slide to the mine and have its blades cut the mine from its mooring cable. The mine then floated to the top and was usually destroyed or sometimes sunk by gunfire from an American naval ship. In some applications, cutting devices were placed on the sweep line itself, or the sweep line could be serrated to do the cutting, but paravanes with blades were used much more frequently by American ships to cut mooring cables in the Pacific in WWII. In most configurations, a kite, basically an unbladed paravane, could be used near the ship to maintain the sweep wire parallel to the bottom at a specified distance from the paravane. The paravane operator would need to know the depth of the moored mines to set the proper depth of the paravane and kite, and could use sonar for this purpose.

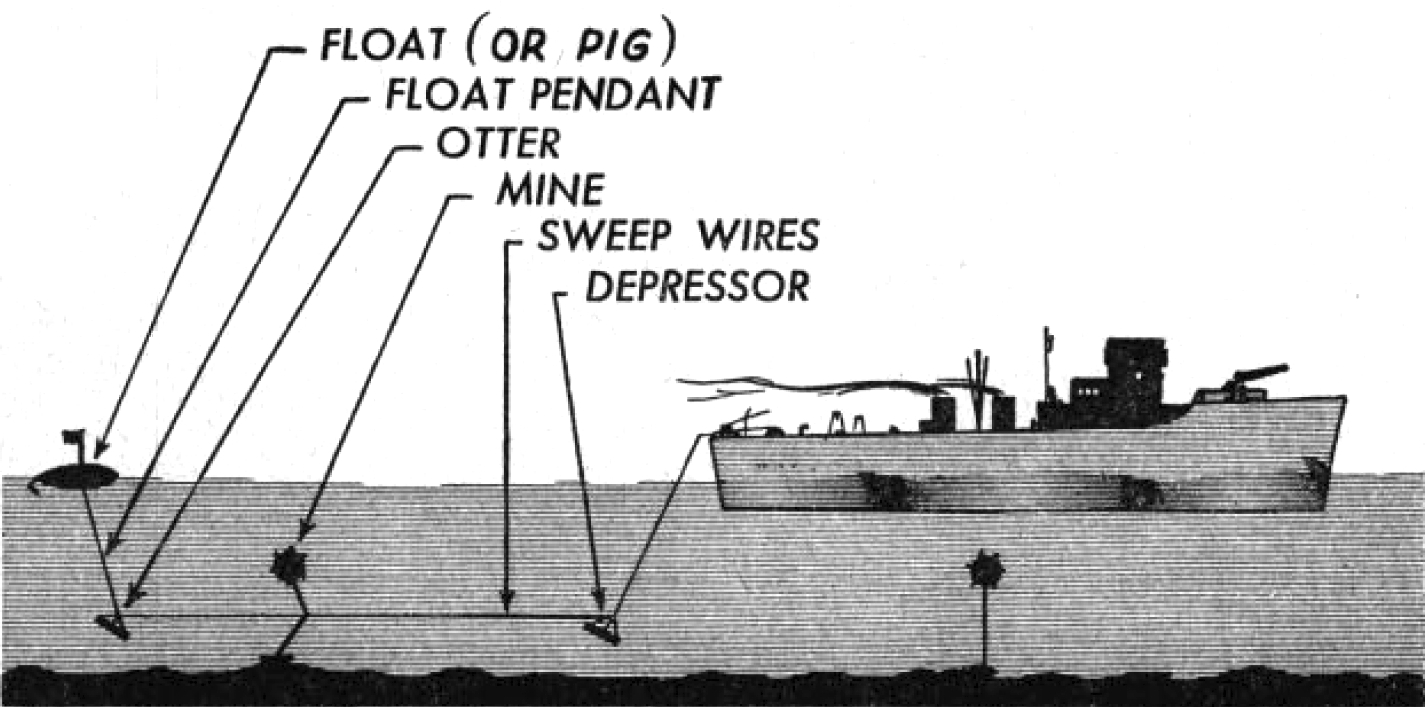
Cutting a moored mine. A paravane and kite replace the "Otter" and "Depressor", with the paravane doing the cutting

Minesweeping ships would often travel side by side in formation to sweep a larger channel. Large winches and two large davits which looked like cranes on each side of the stern of minesweepers were used to haul minesweeping gear. Acoustic mines were destroyed by sound generators that imitated the sound frequencies of a passing ship, and electrical mines, though rarely used by the Japanese, could be destroyed by an electrical device or cable passed close to the mine causing it to detonate. Ship sonar was used as an invaluable tool in locating mines in WWII. More sophisticated pressure mines were used by Germany in the Atlantic but were not frequent and their use was delayed by the Germans until 1944 at the Battle of Normandy. Pressure mines were activated by the increase in water pressure under a moving vessel, and had to be swept using a towed hulk large enough to produce the required pressure surge. Markers in the form of buoys were often used to mark mineswept lanes where transport ships or landing craft could find safe passage to beach heads or other destinations. Buoys were usually used to mark the end of a mine sweep cable floated directly above the paravane, and could be particularly helpful when minesweepers were sweeping in formation.

== Gleaves-class minesweepers ==
The 24 subsequent ships in the series were Gleaves-class destroyers completed during the war. They had a longer range, a larger crew, and guns highly effective against aircraft, 5 × 5 in (127 mm) dual purpose guns, and 6 × 0.50 in. (12.7 mm) guns. The later Gleaves-class destroyers had 6 × 0.50 in. and (12.7 mm) guns. Twelve Atlantic Fleet ships (DD-454–458, 461, 462, 464, 621, 625, 636, and 637) were converted in 1944, with the rest in the Pacific in 1945 (DD-489, 490, 493–496, 618, 627, and 632–635). Many of these Atlantic based minesweeper fleets were switched to the Pacific by the end of the war however, a few as early as late 1944. Viewing the table below, an argument could be made that even the increased firepower and accuracy of the antiaircraft guns on the Gleaves-class destroyers did not adequately protect them from the wide scale attack by kamikazes at Okinawa, but one might assert that if Clemson-class destroyers had been used more widely at Okinawa, they might have suffered greater damage and experienced more sinkings.

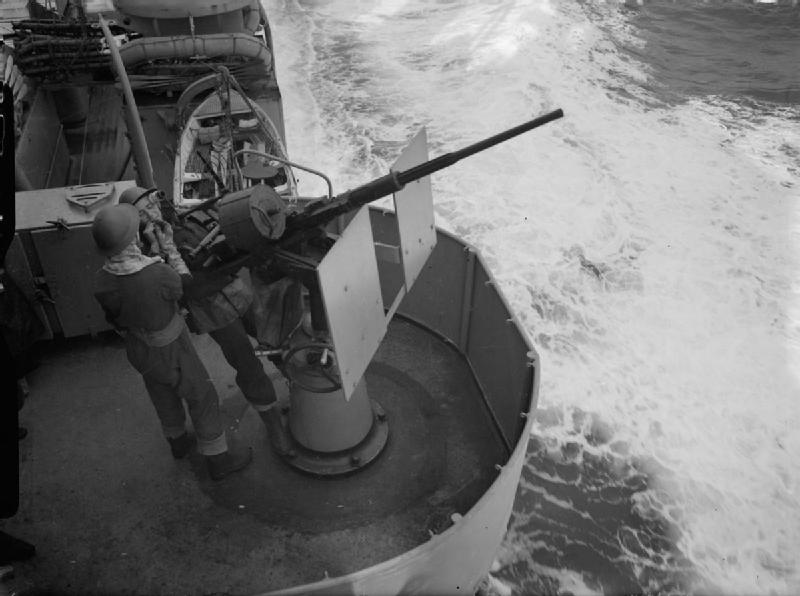
A single mount 20 mm Oerlikon gun on a ship in 1942

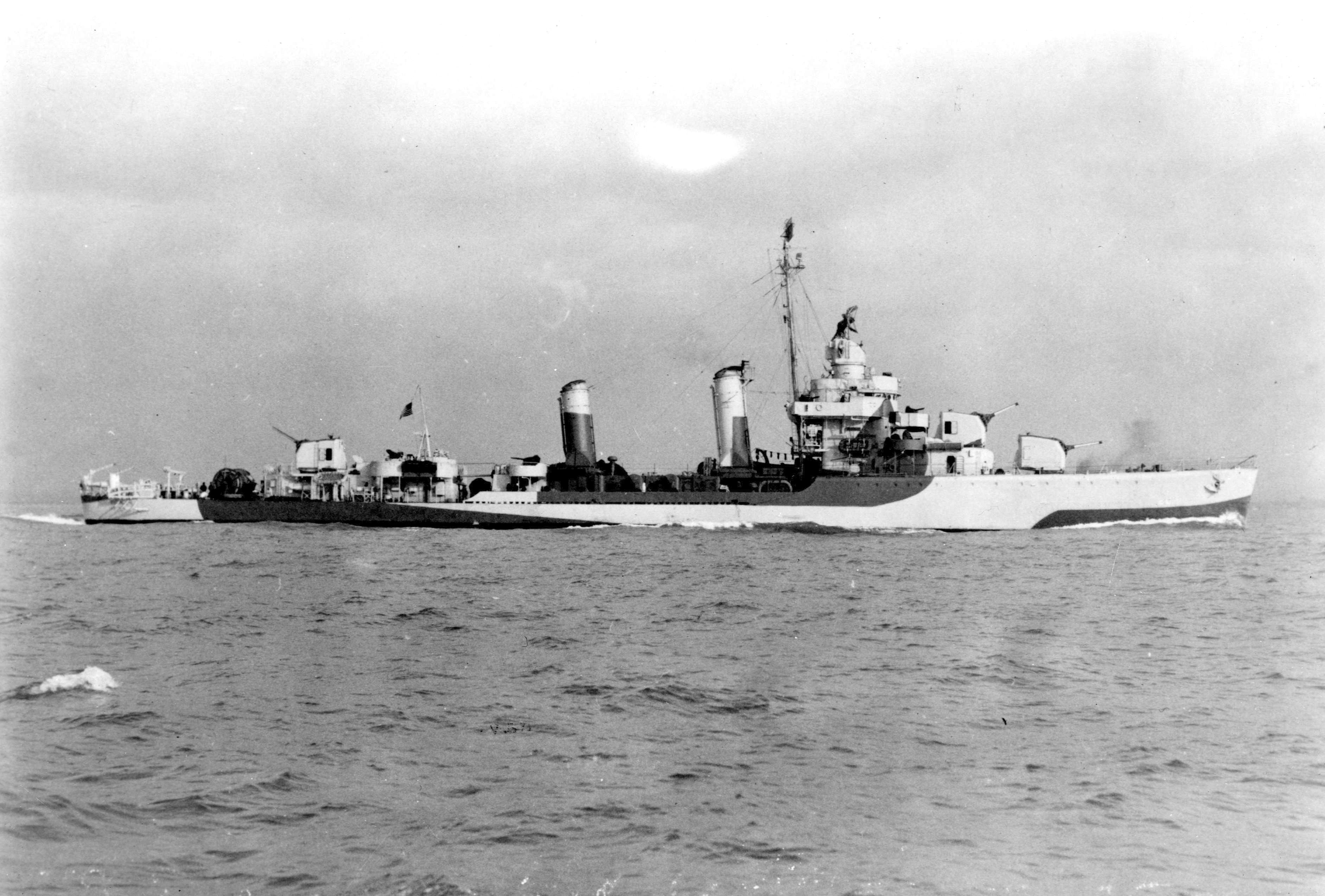
USS Hambleton as converted minesweeper in 1944 with crane at stern, click to enlarge

Magnetic and acoustic minesweeping gear was fitted to the new Gleaves-class minesweepers, while armament was somewhat reduced from the former destroyer configuration to three 5 in guns, no torpedo tubes, two K-guns for launching depth charges, four 40 mm guns, likely Bofors, in two twin mounts, and seven 20 mm Oerlikon antiaircraft guns on the Atlantic ships. The Pacific ships and Hobson had increased light AA armament, with eight 40 mm guns, likely Bofors, in two quad mounts and six 20 mm Oerlikon antiaircraft guns in two twin and two single mounts. For their size, these ships carried some of the most highly effective anti-aircraft weaponry of the war. At lower right, the USS Hambleton, is shown fully converted to minesweeper in 1944. Note the large number of fully shielded and more modern antiaircraft guns, a major improvement over converted Clemson-class sweepers, and the stern crane or davits used to haul minesweeping equipment. Shown below is a list of the Gleaves-class destroyers, launched in 1941, and converted to destroyer minesweepers from 1944 to 1945, with their minesweeper hull designation first, and their former destroyer designation on the right.

- USS Ellyson (DMS-19) (DD-454) Atlantic
- USS Hambleton (DMS-20) (DD-455) Atlantic
- USS Rodman (DMS-21) (DD-456) Atlantic
- USS Emmons (DMS-22) (DD-457) Atlantic
- USS Macomb (DMS-23) (DD-458) Atlantic
- USS Forrest (DMS-24) (DD-461) Atlantic
- USS Fitch (DMS-25) (DD-462) Atlantic
- USS Hobson (DMS-26) (DD-464) Atlantic
- USS Jeffers (DMS-27) (DD-621) Atlantic
- USS Harding (DMS-28) (DD-625) Atlantic
- USS Butler (DMS-29) (DD-636) Atlantic
- USS Gherardi (DMS-30) (DD-637) Atlantic
- USS Mervine (DMS-31) (DD-489) Pacific
- USS Quick (DMS-32) (DD-490) Pacific
- USS Carmick (DMS-33) (DD-493) Pacific
- USS Doyle (DMS-34) (DD-494) Pacific
- USS Endicott (DMS-35) (DD-495) Pacific
- USS McCook (DMS-36) (DD-496) Pacific
- USS Davison (DMS-37) (DD-618) Pacific
- USS Thompson (DMS-38) (DD-627) Pacific
- USS Cowie (DMS-39) (DD-632) Pacific
- USS Knight (DMS-40) (DD-633) Pacific
- USS Doran (DMS-41) (DD-634) Pacific
- USS Earle (DMS-42) (DD-635) Pacific
- USS Hale (DMS-43) – not converted to DMS

The Forrest, Hobson, Macomb, Dorsey, Hopkins, Ellyson, Hambleton, Rodman, Emmons, Butler, Gherardi, Jeffers, and Harding served in Okinawa in April 1945. All were Gleaves-class destroyer minesweepers with the exception of the Dorsey and Hopkins.

== WWII destroyer minesweepers damaged and sunk ==
All but the Wasmuth, Zane, and Perry below were damaged at Luzon's Lingayen Gulf in the Philippines in January, or at Okinawa in April 1945. An asterisk indicates a destroyer minesweeper that was sunk or scuttled after irreparable damage. Okinawa proved to be the most devastating battle for destroyer minesweepers with eight Gleaves-class destroyer minesweepers damaged by kamikazes, which included one sunk, and one Clemson-class minesweeper, the Hopkins, hit by a kamikaze. Though the Brooks was not technically classified as a destroyer minesweeper, she was a Clemson-class destroyer transport, and had formerly acted as a sweeper before being irreparably damaged at Lingayen Gulf.

Destroyer minesweepers lost or damaged in WWII, primarily Pacific
| Day | Time | Ship | Type | Damage | Cause | Location | Killed | Wounded |
| 25 Oct 1942, 20 Feb 1944 | (1942) 1030 | USS Zane | Clemson | (1942) Moderate (1944) Minor | (1942) Destroyer shell (1944) Mines exploded nearby during mine disposal | (1942) Solomon Islands (1944) Eniwetok, in the Marshall Islands | (1942) 3 (1944) 0 | (1942) 0 (1944) 0 |
| 25 Dec 1942 | Unknown | *USS Wasmuth | Clemson | Sunk 29 Dec | 2 depth charges exploded | Aleutian Islands | 0 | 0 |
| 12 Sept 1944 | 1607 | *USS Perry | Clemson | Sunk | Mine explosion | Off Anguar, near Peleliu | 8 | 17 |
| 6 Jan 1945 | 1215 | *USS Long | Clemson | Sunk | Kamikaze | Lingayen Gulf | 1 | 35 |
| 6 Jan 1945 | 1252 | USS Brooks | Clemson Transport; Sometimes swept | Extensive, retired shortly after | Kamikaze | Lingayen Gulf | 3 | 11 |
| 6 Jan 1945, 9 Oct 1945 | (1/1945) 1732 | USS Southard | Clemson | (1/1945) Moderate (10/1945) Scuttled 14 January 1946 | (1/1945) Kamikaze (10/1945) Grounded by typhoon Louise | (1/1945) Lingayen Gulf (10/1945) Okinawa | (1/1945) 0 (10/1945) 0 | (1/1945) 6 (10/1945) 0 |
| 7 Jan 1945 | 0430 | *USS Hovey | Clemson | Sunk | Aerial torpedo | Lingayen Gulf | 46 | 3 |
| 7 Jan 1945 | 1835 | *USS Palmer | Wickes | Sunk | 2 aerial bombs | Lingayen Gulf | 28 | 38 |
| 11 Nov 1942, 3 Apr 1945 | Unknown | USS Hambleton | Gleaves | (1942) Major (1945) Minor | (1942) Torpedoed (1945) Kamikaze | (1942) French Morocco (1945) Okinawa | 0 | 0 |
| 6 Apr 1945 | 1734 | *USS Emmons | Gleaves | Sunk | Kamikazes | Okinawa | 60 | 77 |
| 6 Apr 1945 | 1734 | USS Rodman | Gleaves | Extensive | Kamikazes | Okinawa | 16 | 20 |
| 16 Apr 1945 | Unknown | USS Harding | Gleaves | Extensive, but repaired | Kamikazes | Okinawa | 22 | 10 |
| 16 Apr 1945 | 0928 | USS Hobson | Gleaves | Extensive (later sunk 1952) | Kamikazes | Okinawa | 4 | 6 |
| 3 May 1945 | Pre-dawn | USS McComb | Gleaves | Extensive | Kamikazes | Okinawa | 7 | 14 |
| 4 May 1945 | Unknown | USS Hopkins | Clemson | Minor | Kamikaze | Okinawa | 1 | 0 |
| 25 May 1945 | Unknown | USS Butler | Gleaves | Extensive, but repaired | Kamikaze bombs | Okinawa | 9 | 0 |
| 27 May 1945 | Unknown | USS Forrest | Gleaves | Extensive, but repaired | Kamikaze | Okinawa | 5 | 13 |
| 9 Oct 1945 | Unknown | *USS Dorsey | Wickes | Scuttled 1 January 1946 | Grounded by typhoon Louise | Okinawa | 0 | 3 |
| 1942, 9 Oct 1945 | Unknown | USS Lamberton | Wickes | Minor, returned to service | (1942) Minor damage in collision (1945) Grounded by typhoon Louise | (1942) Aleutian Islands (1945) Okinawa | 0 | 0 |

== In popular culture ==
While holding the rank of lieutenant, the author Herman Wouk served on the destroyer minesweeper USS Zane from February 1943 to February 1945. He based much of his Pulitzer Prize winning novel The Caine Mutiny on his experiences on the USS Southard from May to October 1945, particularly when she was run aground at Okinawa that October by typhoon Louise. The fictional USS Caine, (DMS-18), from Wouk's novel is shown in a sketch in the book. Although showing only two smokestacks, the sketch illustrates a flush deck and a galley deckhouse similar to the converted Wickes-class destroyer minesweepers which actually had three smokestacks, as did the two converted Clemson-class destroyers on which Wouk served.

== See also ==
- List of destroyer-minesweepers

== Sources ==
- Navy Memorial Society website
