= Gleaves-class destroyer =

Destroyer class of the US Navy

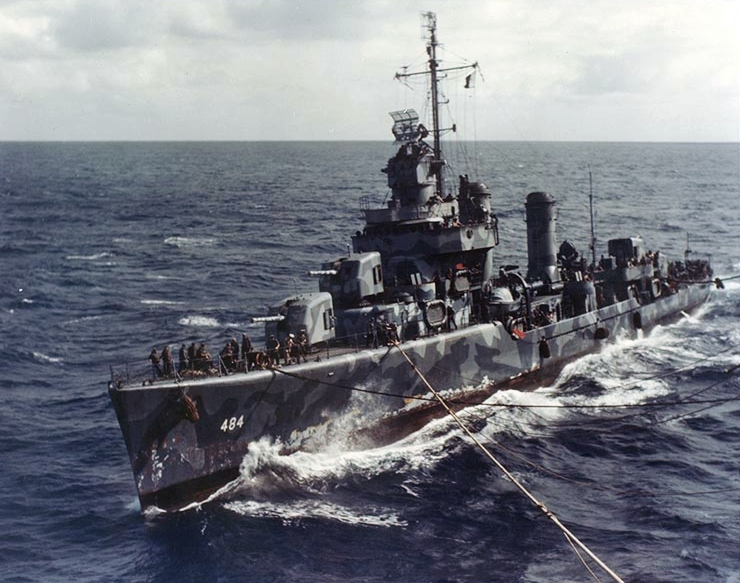
- USS Buchanan in 1942

Class overview
- Name: Gleaves class
- Builders: Federal Shipbuilding, NJ (26); Boston Navy Yard, MA (10); Seattle-Tacoma Shipbuilding, WA (10); Bath Iron Works, ME (8); Charleston Navy Yard, SC (7); Philadelphia Navy Yard, PA (2); Norfolk Navy Yard, VA (2); Puget Sound Navy Yard, WA (1)
- Operators: United States Navy; Hellenic Navy; Japan Maritime Self-Defense Force; Italian Navy; Republic of China Navy; Turkish Navy
- Preceded by: Benson class
- Succeeded by: Fletcher class
- Subclasses: Bristol class; Artigliere class; Asakaze class
- Built: 1938–1943
- In commission: 1940–1956
- Completed: 66
- Lost: 14
- Retired: 52

General characteristics
- Class & type: Destroyer
- Displacement: 1,630 tons standard, 2,395 tons full load
- Length: 348 ft 3 in (106.15 m)
- Beam: 36 ft 1 in (11.00 m)
- Draft: 13 ft 2 in (4.01 m)
- Installed power: 4 Babcock & Wilcox boilers, 2 Westinghouse geared steam turbines; 50000 shp (37 MW)
- Propulsion: 2 shafts
- Speed: 37.4 knots (69 km/h) 43 mph
- Range: 6,500 nautical miles (12,000 km; 7,500 mi) at 12 kn (22 km/h; 14 mph)
- Complement: 16 officers, 260 enlisted
- Sensors & processing systems: Mk37 GFCS; 1 × SC radar
- Armament: As designed: 5 × 5 in (127 mm) DP guns, 6 × 0.50 in. (12.7 mm) guns, 10 × 21 inch (533 mm) torpedo tubes (2 × 5), 10 torpedoes; 2 × Depth charge tracks; DD-453 onward: 4 × 5 in (127 mm) DP guns, 4 × 40 mm Bofors guns (2 × 2), 7 × 20 mm Oerlikon guns, 5 × 21 in (533 mm) torpedo tubes (1 × 5), 4-6 × K-gun depth charge throwers, 2 × Depth charge tracks
- Notes: Ship data sources: Destroyers.org, Friedman, pp. 95–109, 470–471

The Gleaves-class destroyers were a class of 66 destroyers of the United States Navy built 1938–42, designed by Gibbs & Cox. The first ship of the class was USS Gleaves. They were the destroyer type that was in production for the Navy when the U.S. entered World War II.

The Gleaves class were initially specified as part of a 24-ship Benson class authorized in fiscal years 1938–40; however, Bethlehem Shipbuilding requested that the six ships designed by them use less complex machinery. Initially, Gleaves and Niblack, although designed by Gibbs & Cox and built by Bath Iron Works, were to follow the Benson design as modified by Bethlehem. This temporarily made Livermore the lead ship with more complex machinery, so the class was initially called the Livermore class, and this name persisted through World War II. However, Gleaves and Niblack were soon shown to be able to be built to the Livermore design. Since Gleaves was completed before Livermore and had a lower hull number, the class is more correctly the Gleaves class; 18 of these were commissioned in 1940–41. The remaining 48 "repeat Gleaveses" were authorized in 1940–42. These plus the 24 "repeat Bensons" were also known at the time as the Bristol class, after USS Bristol. During World War II, the Benson ships were usually combined with the Livermore (more correctly the Gleaves) class as the Benson-Livermore class; this persisted in references until at least the 1960s. The classes are now called the Benson-Gleaves class. In some references both classes are combined and called the Benson class. The Benson- and Gleaves-class destroyers were the backbone of the pre-war Neutrality Patrols and participated in every major naval campaign of the war.

== Related classes ==
See: Benson-class destroyer § Related classes

== Design ==
The Gleaves class was designed as an improved version of the Sims class with two stacks and a new "echeloned" machinery arrangement that featured alternating boiler and engine rooms, designed to give the ships a better chance at surviving torpedo damage. Loss of one compartment, or even two adjacent compartments, would no longer disable the entire propulsion system. This design was credited with the survival of USS Kearny after she was torpedoed by the U-568 near Iceland in October 1941, before the US entered the war. The Benson-Gleaves class also introduced quintuple torpedo tube mounts. Their scantlings, or framing dimensions, were increased to carry the weight of the new machinery. This increased the ships' displacement by about seventy tons, to 1630 tons standard displacement. Twenty ships (DD-493–497, 618–628, and 645–648) had square-faced bridges in an attempt to speed production.

=== Engineering ===
The Gleaves class were all completed with 600 psi (4,100 kPa) steam (references vary) superheated to 850 °F (454 °C), double-reduction gearing, and cruising turbines. The main steam turbines were designed and built by Westinghouse.

=== Armament ===
The class was completed with four or five 5-inch (127 mm) dual purpose guns (anti-surface and anti-aircraft (AA)), controlled by a Mark 37 Gun Fire Control System as in the previous Sims class. The introduction of two centerline quintuple torpedo tube mounts in the Benson-Gleaves class was a significant improvement and was continued in subsequent World War II classes. This allowed a broadside of ten tubes with savings in space and weight compared to previous classes, which had twelve or sixteen tubes and an eight-tube broadside. However, most of the Gleaves class spent most of the war with only five torpedo tubes equipped in favor of greater light anti-aircraft armament. This varied considerably in different ships as the war went on; for example, the specified pair of twin 40 mm (1.6 in) guns were not widely available until mid-1942 and a quadruple 1.1 in (28 mm) gun mount and a 20 mm (0.79 in) gun were temporarily substituted. In 1945 sixteen ships (DD-423, 424, 429–432, 435, 437–440, 443, 497, 623, 624, and 628) were modified for maximum light AA armament as an anti-kamikaze measure, with four 5-inch guns, no torpedo tubes, twelve 40 mm guns in two quad and two twin mounts and four 20 mm guns in two twin mountings. Photographs indicate that, as with most pre-1942 destroyers, the initial anti-submarine armament of two depth charge tracks was augmented with four or six K-gun depth charge throwers in 1941–42 on most ships. In 1943 twelve ships (DD-493, 609, 620, 622, 623, 635, 637–639, and 646–648) were temporarily equipped with three Mousetrap ASW rocket launchers, but this was unsuccessful and the only such installation on post-1930 US destroyers. They were removed beginning in March 1944.

=== Habitability ===
Chief petty officers had quarters in the forecastle. All other enlisted sailors had a bunk in large open living compartments astern of the engineering spaces. Beneath each tier of bunks were individual lockers with a wooden grate floor. As seawater entered the compartment during rough weather, the wooden grate was intended to lift the locker contents above the deck and allow the seawater to drain out as it sloshed over the deck when the ship rolled. No laundry was included in the original design, but a single washing machine was later installed in a compartment the size of a closet. Clothing could be washed and spun damp to be hung to dry wherever space allowed.

=== DMS conversions ===
Twenty-four Gleaves-class ships were converted to destroyer minesweepers (DMS-19 through DMS-42) in 1944 and 1945. Twelve Atlantic Fleet ships (DD-454–458, 461, 462, 464, 621, 625, 636, and 637) were converted in 1944, with the rest in the Pacific in 1945 (DD-489, 490, 493–496, 618, 627, and 632–635). Magnetic and acoustic minesweeping gear was fitted, with armament reduced to three 5 in guns, no torpedo tubes, two K-guns, four 40 mm guns in two twin mounts, and seven 20 mm guns on the Atlantic ships. The Pacific ships and Hobson had increased light AA armament, with eight 40 mm guns in two quad mounts and six 20 mm guns in two twin and two single mounts. Twelve DMS conversions were the only Benson-Gleaves-class ships retained in service postwar. However, they were judged ineffective in the Korean War due to requiring a large crew compared with purpose-built minesweepers, and were decommissioned in 1954–56.

== Service ==
Twenty-one were in commission when the Japanese attacked Pearl Harbor. A total of sixty-six were built, of which eleven were lost to enemy action during World War II: Gwin, Meredith, Monssen, Bristol, Emmons, Aaron Ward, Duncan, Beatty, Glennon, Corry, and Maddox. Six of these were in the Pacific, two were off Normandy, and three were in the Mediterranean. Ingraham was lost in a collision with an oiler in 1942, and Turner was lost to an internal explosion in 1944.

Most were decommissioned and placed in the Reserve Fleet just following World War II. Twelve DMS conversions remained in commission into the 1950s, the last withdrawn from service in 1956. Hobson was sunk in a collision with the aircraft carrier Wasp in 1952. Baldwin grounded while under tow and was scuttled in 1961 while out of commission, thus is not counted as a loss.

Eleven ships of the class were transferred to foreign navies 1949–1959; two to Greece, four to Turkey, one to Italy, two to Taiwan, and two to Japan. On 19 October 1954 Ellyson and Macomb were transferred to the Japanese Maritime Self-Defense Force where they served as JDS Asakaze and JDS Hatakaze, the latter was further transferred to Taiwan in 1970 as Hsien Yang to replace the ex-Rodman of the same name.

Modernization was considered in the 1950s but not implemented except on the transferred ships. Those ships not transferred to other countries were mostly sold for scrap in the late 1960s and early 1970s.

== Ships in class ==
Ships of the Gleaves destroyer class
Name	Hull no.	Builder	Laid down	Launched	Commissioned	Decommissioned	Fate
Gleaves	DD-423	Bath Iron Works	16 May 1938	9 December 1939	14 June 1940	8 May 1946	Sold for scrap, 29 June 1972
Niblack	DD-424	Bath Iron Works	8 August 1938	18 May 1940	1 August 1940	June 1946	Sold for scrap, 16 August 1973
Livermore	DD-429	Bath Iron Works	6 March 1939	3 August 1940	7 October 1940	24 January 1947	Sold for scrap, 3 March 1961
Eberle	DD-430	Bath Iron Works	12 April 1939	14 September 1940	4 December 1940	3 June 1946	Transferred to Greece as Niki, 22 January 1951
Plunkett	DD-431	Federal Shipbuilding and Drydock Company	1 March 1939	7 March 1940	17 July 1940	3 May 1946	Transferred to Taiwan as Nan Yang, 16 February 1959
Kearny	DD-432	Federal Shipbuilding and Drydock Company	1 March 1939	9 March 1940	13 September 1940	7 March 1946	Sold for scrap, 6 October 1972
Gwin	DD-433	Boston Navy Yard	1 June 1939	25 May 1940	15 January 1941	—N/a	Sunk, Battle of Kolombangara, 13 July 1943
Meredith	DD-434	Boston Navy Yard	1 June 1939	24 April 1940	1 March 1941	—N/a	Sunk by air attack near San Cristóbal, Solomon Islands, 15 October 1942
Grayson	DD-435	Charleston Navy Yard	17 July 1939	7 August 1940	14 February 1941	4 February 1947	Sold for scrap, 12 June 1974
Monssen	DD-436	Puget Sound Navy Yard	12 July 1939	16 May 1940	14 March 1941	—N/a	Sunk, First Naval Battle of Guadalcanal, 13 November 1942
Woolsey	DD-437	Bath Iron Works	9 October 1939	12 February 1941	7 May 1941	6 February 1947	Sold for scrap, 29 May 1974
Ludlow	DD-438	Bath Iron Works	18 December 1939	11 November 1940	5 March 1941	20 May 1946	Transferred to Greece as Doxa, 22 January 1951
Ludlow	DD-438	Bath Iron Works	18 December 1939	11 November 1940	6 June 1950	22 January 1951	Transferred to Greece as Doxa, 22 January 1951
Edison	DD-439	Federal Shipbuilding and Drydock Company	18 March 1940	23 November 1940	31 January 1941	18 May 1946	Sold for scrap, 29 December 1966
Ericsson	DD-440	Federal Shipbuilding and Drydock Company	18 March 1940	23 November 1940	13 March 1941	15 March 1946	Sunk as target, 17 November 1970
Wilkes	DD-441	Boston Navy Yard	1 November 1939	31 May 1940	22 April 1941	4 March 1946	Sold for scrap, 29 June 1972
Nicholson	DD-442	Boston Navy Yard	1 November 1939	31 May 1940	3 June 1941	26 February 1946	Transferred to Italy as Aviere, 15 January 1951
Nicholson	DD-442	Boston Navy Yard	1 November 1939	31 May 1940	17 July 1950	15 January 1951	Transferred to Italy as Aviere, 15 January 1951
Swanson	DD-443	Charleston Navy Yard	15 November 1939	2 November 1940	29 May 1941	10 December 1945	Sold for scrap, 29 June 1972
Ingraham	DD-444	Charleston Navy Yard	15 November 1939	15 February 1941	19 July 1941	—N/a	Sunk in collision with USS Chemung near the Azores, 22 August 1942
Bristol	DD-453	Federal Shipbuilding and Drydock Company	20 December 1940	25 July 1941	22 October 1941	—N/a	Sunk by U-371 near Algeria, 13 October 1943
Ellyson	DD-454	Federal Shipbuilding and Drydock Company	20 December 1940	26 July 1941	28 November 1941	19 October 1954	Transferred to Japan as Asakaze, 19 October 1954
Hambleton	DD-455	Federal Shipbuilding and Drydock Company	16 December 1940	26 September 1941	22 December 1941	15 January 1955	Sold for scrap, 22 November 1972
Rodman	DD-456	Federal Shipbuilding and Drydock Company	16 December 1940	26 September 1941	29 April 1942	28 July 1955	Transferred to Taiwan as Hsien Yang, 28 July 1955
Emmons	DD-457	Bath Iron Works	14 November 1940	23 August 1941	5 December 1941	—N/a	Sunk by kamikazes near Okinawa, 6 April 1945
Macomb	DD-458	Bath Iron Works	3 September 1940	23 September 1941	26 January 1942	19 October 1954	Transferred to Japan as Hatakaze, 19 October 1954, later transferred to Taiwan as Hsien Yang, 6 August 1970
Forrest	DD-461	Boston Navy Yard	6 January 1941	14 June 1941	13 January 1942	30 November 1945	Sold for scrap, 20 November 1946
Fitch	DD-462	Boston Navy Yard	6 January 1941	14 June 1941	3 February 1942	24 February 1956	Sunk as target off Northeast Florida, 15 November 1973
Corry	DD-463	Charleston Navy Yard	4 September 1940	28 July 1941	18 December 1941	—N/a	Sunk by shore-based gunfire off Carentan River, France, 6 June 1944
Hobson	DD-464	Charleston Navy Yard	14 November 1940	8 September 1941	22 January 1942	—N/a	Sunk in collision with USS Wasp, 26 April 1952
Aaron Ward	DD-483	Federal Shipbuilding and Drydock Company	11 February 1941	22 November 1941	4 March 1942	—N/a	Sunk by air attack off Guadalcanal, 7 April 1943
Buchanan	DD-484	Federal Shipbuilding and Drydock Company	11 February 1941	22 November 1941	21 March 1942	21 May 1946	Transferred to Turkey as Gelibolu, 28 April 1949
Duncan	DD-485	Federal Shipbuilding and Drydock Company	31 July 1941	20 February 1942	16 April 1942	—N/a	Sunk, Battle of Cape Esperance, 12 October 1942
Lansdowne	DD-486	Federal Shipbuilding and Drydock Company	31 July 1941	20 February 1942	29 April 1942	2 May 1946	Transferred to Turkey as Gaziantep, 10 June 1949
Lardner	DD-487	Federal Shipbuilding and Drydock Company	15 September 1941	20 March 1942	13 May 1942	16 May 1946	Transferred to Turkey as Gemlik, 10 June 1949
McCalla	DD-488	Federal Shipbuilding and Drydock Company	15 September 1941	20 March 1942	27 May 1942	17 May 1946	Transferred to Turkey as Giresun, 29 April 1949
Mervine	DD-489	Federal Shipbuilding and Drydock Company	3 November 1941	3 May 1942	17 June 1942	27 May 1949	Sold for scrap, 27 October 1969
Quick	DD-490	Federal Shipbuilding and Drydock Company	3 November 1941	3 May 1942	3 July 1942	28 May 1949	Sold for scrap, 27 August 1973
Carmick	DD-493 DMS-33	Seattle-Tacoma Shipbuilding Corporation	29 May 1941	8 March 1942	28 December 1942	15 February 1954	Sold for scrap, 7 August 1972
Doyle	DD-494 DMS-34	Seattle-Tacoma Shipbuilding Corporation	26 May 1941	17 March 1942	27 January 1943	19 May 1955	Sold for scrap, 6 October 1972
Endicott	DD-495 DMS-35	Seattle-Tacoma Shipbuilding Corporation	1 May 1941	5 April 1942	25 February 1943	17 August 1955	Sold for scrap, 6 October 1970
McCook	DD-496 DMS-36	Seattle-Tacoma Shipbuilding Corporation	1 May 1941	30 April 1942	15 March 1943	27 May 1949	Sold for scrap, 27 August 1973
Frankford	DD-497	Seattle-Tacoma Shipbuilding Corporation	5 June 1941	17 May 1942	31 March 1943	6 March 1946	Sunk as target near Puerto Rico, 4 December 1973
Davison	DD-618	Federal Shipbuilding and Drydock Company	26 February 1942	19 July 1942	11 September 1942	24 June 1949	Sold for scrap, 27 August 1973
Edwards	DD-619	Federal Shipbuilding and Drydock Company	26 February 1942	19 July 1942	18 September 1942	11 April 1946	Sold for scrap, 25 May 1973
Glennon	DD-620	Federal Shipbuilding and Drydock Company	25 March 1942	26 August 1942	8 October 1942	—N/a	Sunk by mine off Quinéville, France, 10 June 1944
Jeffers	DD-621	Federal Shipbuilding and Drydock Company	25 March 1942	26 August 1942	5 November 1942	23 May 1955	Sold for scrap, 25 May 1973
Maddox	DD-622	Federal Shipbuilding and Drydock Company	7 May 1942	15 September 1942	31 October 1942	—N/a	Sunk by air attack off Sicily, 10 July 1943
Nelson	DD-623	Federal Shipbuilding and Drydock Company	7 May 1942	15 September 1942	26 November 1942	January 1947	Sold for scrap, 18 July 1969
Baldwin	DD-624	Seattle-Tacoma Shipbuilding Corporation	19 July 1941	14 June 1942	30 April 1943	20 June 1946	Grounded at Montauk, New York 15 April 1961, scuttled 5 June 1961
Harding	DD-625	Seattle-Tacoma Shipbuilding Corporation	22 July 1941	28 June 1942	25 May 1943	2 November 1945	Sold for scrap, 16 April 1947
Satterlee	DD-626	Seattle-Tacoma Shipbuilding Corporation	10 September 1941	17 July 1942	1 July 1943	16 March 1946	Sold for scrap, 8 May 1972
Thompson	DD-627	Seattle-Tacoma Shipbuilding Corporation	22 September 1941	15 July 1942	10 July 1943	18 May 1954	Sold for scrap, 7 August 1972
Welles	DD-628	Seattle-Tacoma Shipbuilding Corporation	27 September 1941	7 September 1942	16 August 1943	4 February 1946	Sold for scrap, 18 July 1969
Cowie	DD-632	Boston Navy Yard	18 March 1941	27 September 1941	1 June 1942	27 April 1947	Sold for scrap, 22 February 1972
Knight	DD-633	Boston Navy Yard	18 March 1941	27 September 1941	23 June 1942	19 March 1947	Sunk as a target near Southern California, 27 October 1967
Doran	DD-634	Boston Navy Yard	14 June 1941	10 December 1941	4 August 1942	29 January 1947	Sold for scrap, 27 August 1973
Earle	DD-635	Boston Navy Yard	14 June 1941	10 December 1941	1 September 1942	17 May 1947	Sold for scrap, October 1970
Butler	DD-636	Philadelphia Naval Shipyard	16 September 1941	12 February 1942	15 August 1942	8 November 1945	Sold for scrap, 10 January 1948
Gherardi	DD-637	Philadelphia Naval Shipyard	16 September 1941	12 February 1942	15 September 1942	17 December 1955	Sunk as target near Puerto Rico, 3 June 1973
Herndon	DD-638	Norfolk Naval Shipyard	26 August 1941	2 February 1942	20 December 1942	28 January 1946	Sunk as target, 24 May 1973
Shubrick	DD-639	Norfolk Naval Shipyard	17 February 1942	18 April 1942	7 February 1943	16 November 1945	Sold for scrap, 28 September 1947
Beatty	DD-640	Charleston Navy Yard	1 May 1941	20 December 1941	7 May 1942	—N/a	Sunk by air attack off Algeria, 6 November 1943
Tillman	DD-641	Charleston Navy Yard	1 May 1941	20 December 1941	4 June 1942	6 February 1947	Sold for scrap, 8 May 1972
Stevenson	DD-645	Federal Shipbuilding and Drydock Company	23 July 1942	11 November 1942	15 December 1942	27 April 1946	Sold for scrap, 2 June 1970
Stockton	DD-646	Federal Shipbuilding and Drydock Company	24 July 1942	11 November 1942	11 January 1943	16 May 1946	Sold for scrap, 25 May 1973
Thorn	DD-647	Federal Shipbuilding and Drydock Company	15 November 1942	28 February 1943	1 April 1943	6 May 1946	Sunk as target off Northeast Florida, 22 August 1974
Turner	DD-648	Federal Shipbuilding and Drydock Company	16 November 1942	28 February 1943	15 April 1943	—N/a	Sunk by internal explosion near New York City, 3 January 1944

== Film appearances ==
The 1954 movie The Caine Mutiny was filmed on USS Doyle and possibly USS Thompson. In the 1951 novel, Caine is a Wickes or Clemson-class destroyer minesweeper.

The destroyer shown in the opening and closing scenes of the movie musical On the Town is USS Nicholson.

== See also ==
- List of destroyers of the United States Navy
- List of destroyer classes of the United States Navy
- List of destroyer-minesweepers
- List of ship classes of the Second World War
