= USS Carmick =

Gleaves-class destroyer

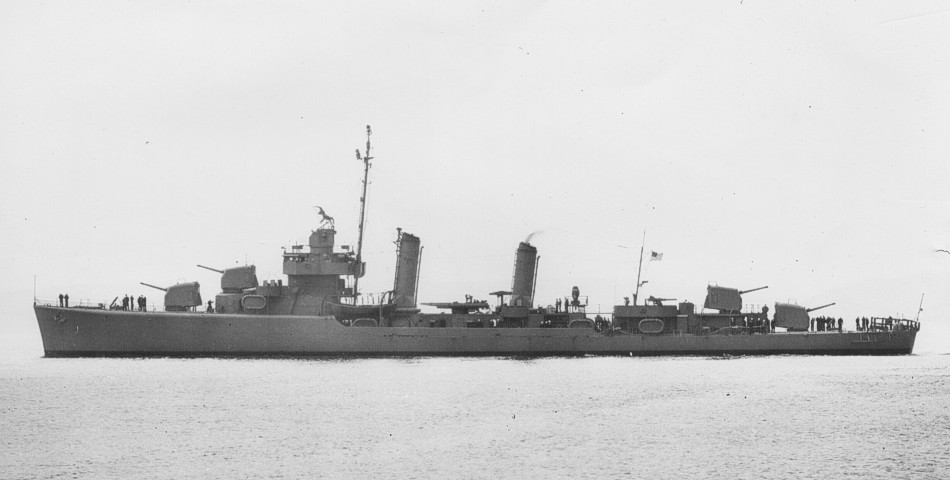
- USS Carmick (DD-493)

History

United States
- Name: Carmick
- Namesake: Daniel Carmick
- Builder: Seattle-Tacoma Shipbuilding Corporation
- Laid down: 29 May 1941
- Launched: 8 March 1942
- Commissioned: 28 December 1942
- Identification: DD-493
- Reclassified: DMS-33, 23 June 1945
- Decommissioned: 15 February 1954
- Stricken: 1 July 1971
- Fate: Sold 7 August 1972 and; broken up for scrap

General characteristics
- Class & type: Gleaves-class destroyer
- Displacement: 1,630 tons
- Length: 348 ft 3 in (106.15 m)
- Beam: 36 ft 1 in (11.00 m)
- Draft: 11 ft 10 in (3.61 m)
- Propulsion: 50,000 shp (37,000 kW); 4 boilers; 2 propellers
- Speed: 37.4 knots (69 km/h)
- Range: 6,500 nmi (12,000 km; 7,500 mi) at 12 kn (22 km/h; 14 mph)
- Complement: 16 officers, 260 enlisted
- Armament: 5 × 5 in (127 mm) dual purpose guns, 6 × 0.50 in (12.7 mm) guns, 6 × Oerlikon 20 mm cannons , 10 × 21 in (533 mm) torpedo tubes, 2 × depth charge tracks

USS Carmick (DD-493/DMS-33), a Gleaves-class destroyer, was the only ship of the United States Navy to be named for Major Daniel Carmick (1772–1816), an officer in the United States Marine Corps who served during the Quasi-War with France and during the War of 1812.

Carmick was launched on 8 March 1942 by Seattle-Tacoma Shipbuilding Co., Seattle, Washington; sponsored by Mrs. H. L. Merrill. The ship was commissioned 28 December 1942. Later in the ship's career, she would be designated destroyer minesweeper DMS-33. After the ship decommissioned, her designation would revert to DD-493.

== Service history ==
=== World War II ===
==== Atlantic and Mediterranean ====
Carmick cleared San Diego, California on 19 February 1943 for Norfolk, Virginia, arriving on 10 March. Her varied and active career as an escort in the Atlantic began in April 1943 when she guarded a convoy to NS Argentia, Newfoundland, from which she returned to New York City to join the escort of a convoy bound for Casablanca. On 8 May she had her first enemy contact, delivering three depth charge attacks until being forced to break off the attack in order to rejoin the convoy. Returning to New York 1 June, Carmick stood north for training in Casco Bay. While running in a fog on 16 June, she struck a submerged object, which incident sent her back to Boston for four months of repairs.

Back in action 5 November 1943, Carmick crossed the Atlantic guarding a convoy to Derry, Northern Ireland in November, escorted Chikaskia to Aruba in December, and in January 1944 protected Hornet during the aircraft carrier's shakedown training off Bermuda. In February, she tested equipment for the Bureau of Ships and escorted Wasp to Trinidad. This phase of Carmick's contribution to the growing might of the Navy ended when the destroyer was assigned to hunter-killer operations with Destroyer Squadron 18 (DesRon 18) from 29 March.

On 2 April 1944, Carmick made two depth charge attacks with inconclusive results on an enemy submarine detected by sound contact. Later the same day, she successfully dodged a torpedo. On 18 April, Carmick cleared Boston for Plymouth, England, arriving 28 April to prepare for her role in the mighty naval force mounting the invasion of Europe. On 6 June (D-Day), she took station guarding the flanks of the leading ships off Omaha Beach, acting as antisubmarine and anti-E-boat screen. As the infantrymen began to move ashore, Carmick provided pin-point gunfire support, knocking out enemy strongpoints. She remained off the beachhead through 17 June, firing against enemy air attacks and guarding the great numbers of ships moving into the area to support forces ashore. On 10 June, she splashed a Heinkel bomber.

Screening duty in the English Channel preceded Carmick's departure for the Mediterranean on 18 July 1944. Convoy duty in connection with the buildup for the invasion of southern France continued until 15 August, day of the preliminary attacks on the coast between Toulon and Cannes. Once more Carmick was in the van of the invasion fleet, with duties similar to those she had at Normandy. Her constant vigilance was rewarded 18 August, when she destroyed an enemy E-boat. She supported the consolidation of the beachhead by convoy escort duty in the western Mediterranean until 23 September, when she cleared for New York City.

After overhaul and training, Carmick made three convoy escort voyages to Casablanca and Oran, guarding men and supplies for the European campaign. On 10 June 1945, she entered Philadelphia Navy Yard for conversion to a high speed minesweeper, and on 23 June 1945, she was reclassified DMS-33.

=== Post war ===
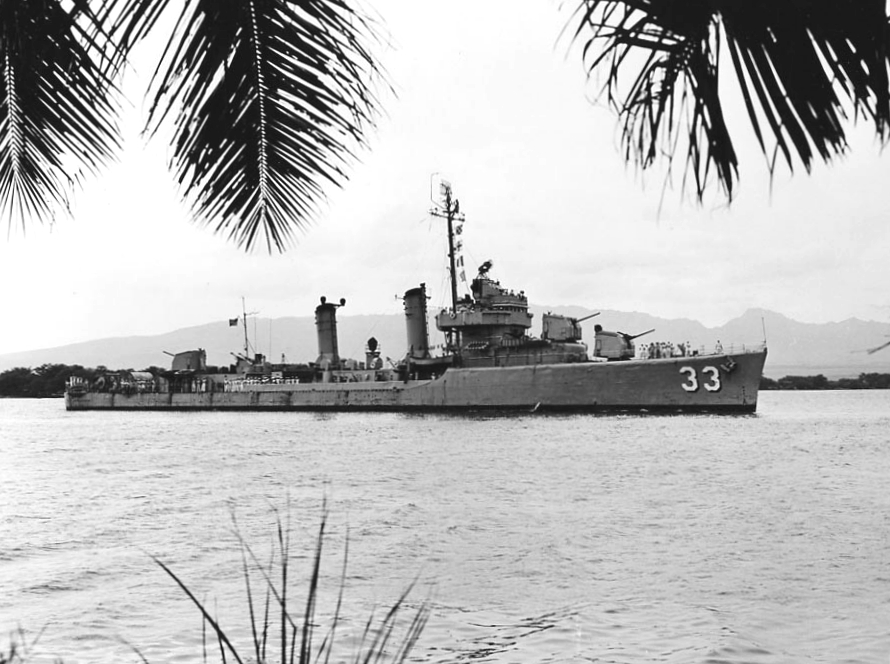
Carmick at Pearl Harbor, circa in the early 1950s.

On 27 August 1945, Carmick cleared Norfolk, Virginia, for the Pacific, arriving at Okinawa 15 October for mine-sweeping operations in the Yellow Sea. She remained in the Far East to support the occupation until returning to San Francisco on 20 April 1946. With San Diego as her home port, Carmick made one tour to the western Pacific in the summer and fall of 1947, and conducted local operations until the outbreak of the Korean War. She cleared San Diego 4 October 1950 for duty in United Nations' efforts in Korean waters. Operating with TF 95 out of Yokosuka, Japan, she patrolled off both coasts of Korea, providing fire-support and minesweeping operations. Along with USS Thompson, she had been assigned to Joint Task Force 7 and organized into Task Group 95.6, the Minesweeping and Protective Group. From 29 October to 3 December, she penetrated the dangerous harbor at Chinnampo to sweep mines, and carried out this difficult assignment so well as to earn the Navy Unit Commendation. She returned to San Diego 21 November 1951 for overhaul and training.

Carmick cleared San Diego 7 May 1952 for her second Korean tour, during which she patrolled off Yang Do Island, bombarded the rail center at Songjin, and provided gunfire support for minesweepers through February 1953. She returned to Long Beach, California, for overhaul 14 March, and in June resumed a schedule of exercises and services to the Fleet Sonar School at San Diego. After preinactivation overhaul at San Francisco, Carmick was placed out of commission in reserve 13 February 1954. She was reclassified DD-493 on 15 July 1955.

== Awards ==
Carmick received three battle stars for World War II service, and the Navy Unit Commendation and five battle stars for Korean War service.
