= USS Earle =

Gleaves-class destroyer

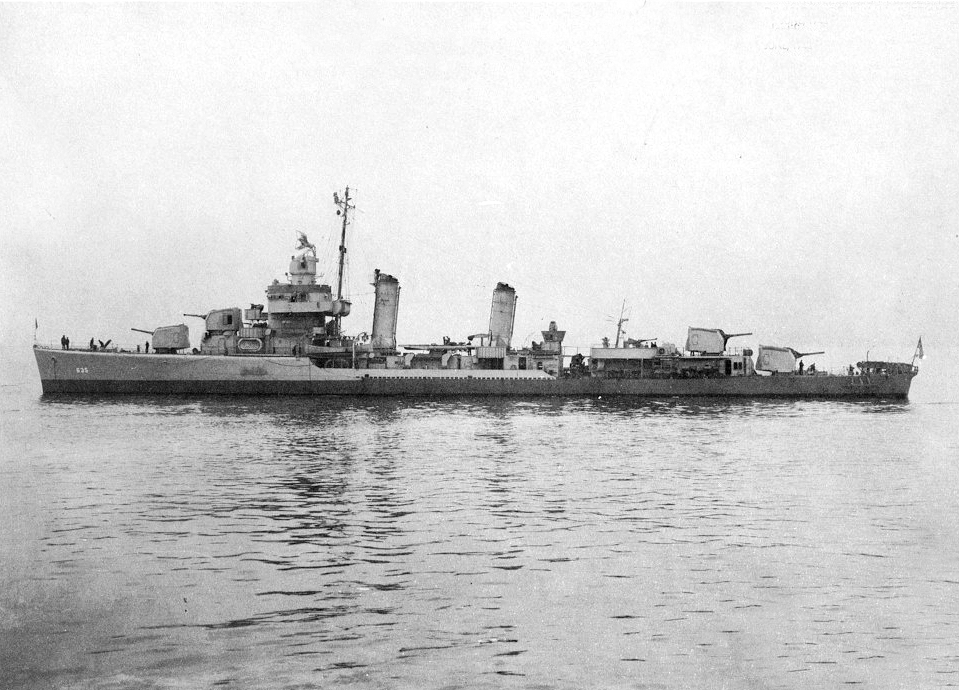
- USS Earle, January 1943 at New York Navy Yard.

History

United States
- Name: Earle
- Namesake: Ralph Earle
- Builder: Boston Navy Yard
- Laid down: 14 June 1941
- Launched: 10 December 1941
- Commissioned: 1 September 1942
- Decommissioned: 17 May 1947
- Stricken: 1 December 1969
- Fate: Sold October 1970 and broken up for scrap

General characteristics
- Class & type: Gleaves-class destroyer
- Displacement: 1,630 tons
- Length: 348 ft 3 in (106.15 m)
- Beam: 37 ft 0 in (11.28 m)
- Draft: 11 ft 10 in (3.61 m)
- Propulsion: 50,000 shp (37,000 kW); 4 boilers; 2 propellers
- Speed: 37.4 knots (69 km/h)
- Range: 6,500 nmi (12,000 km; 7,500 mi) at 12 kn (22 km/h; 14 mph)
- Complement: 16 officers, 260 enlisted
- Armament: 4 × 5 in (127 mm)/38-caliber dual-purpose gun; 4 × Bofors 40 mm guns guns; 7 × Oerlikon 20 mm cannons, 5 × 21 in (533 mm) torpedo tubes (5 Mark 15 torpedoes); 6 × K-gun depth charge projectors, 2 × depth charge tracks

USS Earle (DD-635/DMS-42), a Gleaves-class destroyer, is the only ship of the United States Navy to be named for Rear Admiral Ralph Earle.

Earle was launched on 10 December 1941 by Boston Navy Yard; sponsored by Mrs. John F. Hines Jr., daughter of Rear Admiral Earle; and commissioned on 1 September 1942.

== Service history ==
Between 12 December 1942 and 28 April 1943, Earle escorted three convoys carrying essential men and supplies to Casablanca. On her first voyage, she made two night attacks on surfaced submarines. Sailing from Norfolk on 8 June she arrived at Oran on 22 June to prepare for the invasion of Sicily, and screened the transport area off Scoglitti on 10 July. Two days later she carried on an inspection of the beach area, and then served on escort duty between north Africa ports and Sicily until 11 August when she got underway for New York, arriving the 22nd.

From 6 December 1943 to 1 May 1944, Earle escorted convoys between Boston and New York and the United Kingdom, making four such voyages. She crossed to Naples, arriving 31 May for a summer of general escort duty and training in the Mediterranean between 19 November 1944 and 11 June 1945.

Earle arrived at Norfolk on 20 June 1945 for conversion to a destroyer minesweeper, and was reclassified DMS-42 on 23 June 1945. Ordered to the Pacific at the war's end, she left Norfolk 27 August and called at San Diego, Pearl Harbor, and Eniwetok before arriving at Okinawa on 15 October. She served in the Far East on occupation duty until 18 March 1946, sweeping minefields off Korea, later in a team directing Japanese minesweepers in their home waters. Arriving at San Francisco on 9 April, Earle was placed out of commission in reserve on 17 May 1947. Her classification reverted to DD-635, 15 July 1955.

Earle was stricken from the Naval Vessel Register on 1 December 1969, sold October 1970, and broken up for scrap.

== Awards ==
Earle received two battle stars for World War II service.
