= USS Butler =

Gleaves-class destroyer

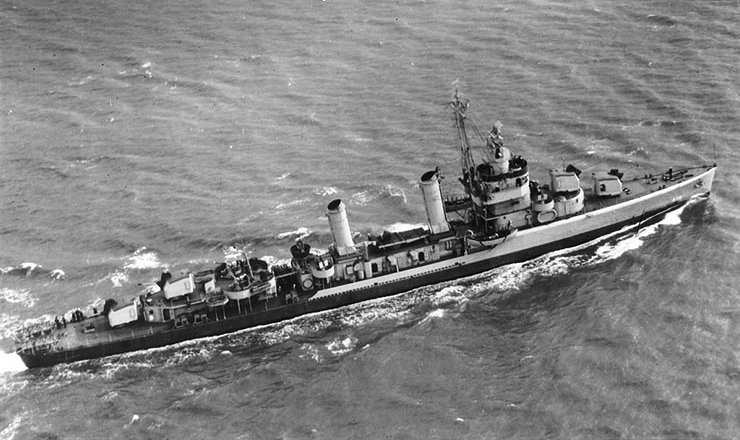
- USS Butler (DD-636) underway

History

United States
- Name: Butler
- Namesake: Smedley Butler
- Builder: Philadelphia Naval Shipyard
- Laid down: 16 September 1941
- Launched: 12 February 1942
- Commissioned: 15 August 1942
- Decommissioned: 8 November 1945
- Reclassified: DMS-29, 15 November 1944
- Stricken: 28 November 1945
- Identification: DD-636
- Fate: Sold 10 January 1948 and broken up for scrap.

General characteristics
- Class & type: Gleaves-class destroyer
- Displacement: 1,630 tons
- Length: 348 ft 3 in (106.15 m)
- Beam: 36 ft 1 in (11.00 m)
- Draft: 11 ft 10 in (3.61 m)
- Propulsion: 4 boilers; 2 propellers; 50,000 shp (37,000 kW)
- Speed: 37.4 knots (69 km/h)
- Range: 6,500 nmi (12,000 km; 7,500 mi) at 12 kn (22 km/h; 14 mph)
- Complement: 16 officers, 260 enlisted
- Armament: 4 × 5 in (127 mm)/38 cal dual purpose guns, 4 × Bofors 40 mm guns; 7 × Oerlikon 20 mm cannons; 5 × 21 inch (533 mm) torpedo tubes (5 Mark 15 torpedoes); 6 × depth charge projectors; 2 × depth charge tracks

USS Butler (DD-636), a Gleaves-class destroyer, is the only ship of the United States Navy to be named for Marine Corps Major General Smedley Butler, twice awarded the Medal of Honor.

Butler was launched on 12 February 1942 by Philadelphia Navy Yard, sponsored by Mrs. John Wehle, daughter of General Butler; and commissioned on 15 August 1942.

== Service history ==
After undergoing shakedown trials, Butler engaged in escort work in the Atlantic Ocean and Gulf of Mexico. On 14 January 1943, she departed on a trans-Atlantic voyage to Casablanca and thence to Dakar, French West Africa. From there she escorted two Free French vessels, Richelieu and Montcalm, to New York. After overhaul in New York and coastwise convoy escort work she set sail for the Mediterranean on 8 June. Following training exercises at Oran and Algiers, she proceeded to Bizerte whence she departed in July for the Allied invasion of Sicily from 9 July to 12 August. She took part in the Amphibious Battle of Gela and subsequently served on escort duty throughout the remainder of the operation. She then steamed for New York, arriving on 22 August.

Butler was engaged in convoy work and overhaul until 5 May 1944 at which time she stood out for the Invasion of Normandy from 6 June to 15 July. She screened heavy units of the bombardment group and served at the inshore fire support station during this assault. From 12 to 30 August she escorted Royal Navy escort carriers taking part in Operation Dragoon. Shortly thereafter she returned to New York for overhaul.

After a convoy run to Marseille in October, Butler returned to New York on 27 October for conversion to a high-speed minesweeper. Reclassified DMS-29 on 15 November, her conversion was completed on 21 December, and she proceeded to Norfolk and joined Mine Squadron 20 (MineRon 20). On 3 January 1945, the ship weighed anchor for Naval Station San Diego en route to Pearl Harbor. Upon completion of extensive training in the Hawaiian area, she sailed to Ulithi and then conducted a pre-invasion sweep around Okinawa. She continued screen and picket duty, splashing many planes, throughout the assault on Okinawa (24 March – 25 May 1945). On 25 May, she downed 5, out of 6, kamakazi, with only one getting through, crashing into the sea and exploding just off of Butler's engine room, killing fourteen men, blowing out steam lines, and flooding the forward fire room, causing the loss of all steam and electric power. The battleship West Virginia stood by Butler until power was regained, and assisted in driving off two more Japanese planes.

The next day, Butler proceeded to Kerama Retto for temporary repairs. After repairs, she proceeded in a group back to the United States. During transit, they encountered a hurricane, and only the Butler survived. She arrived in the United States on 26 August and was decommissioned on 8 November 1945.

She was sold for scrapping on 10 January 1948.

== Awards ==
Butler received the Navy Unit Commendation for her service in the Okinawa operation and four battle stars for her World War II service.
