= USS Knight =

Gleaves-class destroyer

Coordinates: 32.4587°N 119.1524°W

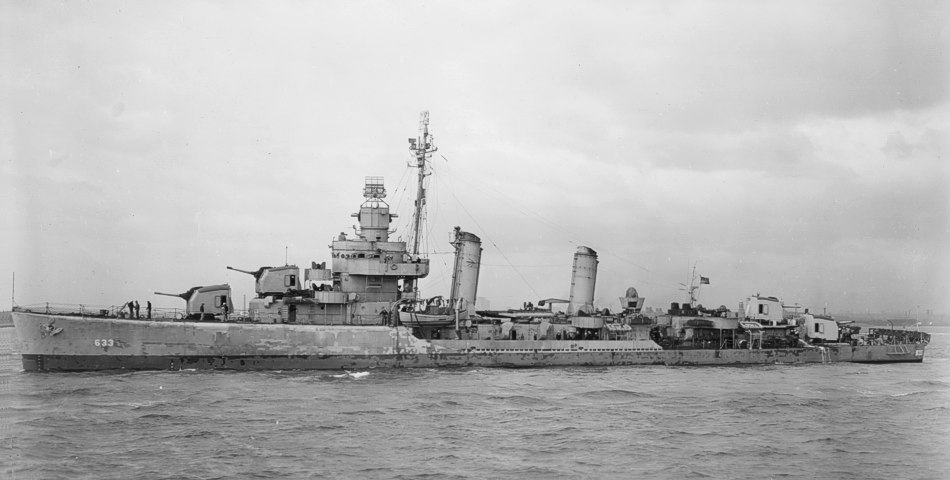
- USS Knight in October 1943

History

United States
- Name: Knight
- Namesake: Austin M. Knight
- Builder: Boston Navy Yard
- Laid down: 18 March 1941
- Launched: 27 September 1941
- Commissioned: 23 June 1942
- Identification: DD-633
- Reclassified: DMS-40, 23 June 1945
- Decommissioned: 19 March 1947
- Stricken: 1 December 1966
- Fate: Sunk as a target off San Diego, California 27 October 1967

General characteristics
- Class & type: Gleaves-class destroyer
- Displacement: 1,630 tons
- Length: 348 ft 3 in (106.15 m)
- Beam: 36 ft 1 in (11.00 m)
- Draft: 11 ft 10 in (3.61 m)
- Propulsion: 50,000 shp (37,000 kW); 4 boilers; 2 propellers
- Speed: 37.4 knots (69 km/h)
- Range: 6,500 nmi (12,000 km; 7,500 mi) at 12 kn (22 km/h; 14 mph)
- Complement: 16 officers, 260 enlisted
- Armament: 4 × 5 in (127 mm)/38 caliber dual purpose guns, 4 × Bofors 40 mm guns (2×2), 7 × Oerlikon 20 mm cannons (5×1), 5 × 21 in (533 mm) torpedo tubes (5 Mark 15 torpedoes); 6 × depth charge projectors, 2 × depth charge tracks

USS Knight (DD-633), a Gleaves-class destroyer, is the only ship of the United States Navy to be named for Admiral Austin M. Knight.

Knight was laid down on 18 March 1941, by Boston Navy Yard and launched on 27 September 1941 Liberty Fleet Day; sponsored by Miss Elizabeth H. Royal, granddaughter of Admiral Knight. The ship was commissioned on 23 June 1942.

== Service history ==
After shakedown off New England, Knight arrived Norfolk 6 October to prepare for Operation Torch, the invasion of North Africa. She cleared Chesapeake Bay on 23 October, joined her task force on 27 October, and arrived off Safi, French Morocco, 8 November. After serving as landing control ship during the assault, she conducted antisubmarine patrols until she sailed 13 November for the United States, arriving Norfolk on 24 November.

From 12 December to 28 April 1943, Knight escorted three convoys between New York and the Moroccan ports of Casablanca and Fedhala. Steaming to Norfolk 29 May, she departed 8 June in convoy for the Mediterranean, where she arrived in Oran, Algeria, 22 June to prepare for the invasion of Sicily. Sailing 5 July with Rear Admiral Alan G. Kirk's Task Force 86 (TF 86), she arrived off Scoglitti during first watch on 9 July. As a fire support ship during Central Force landings on 10 July, she silenced enemy shore batteries and screened transports from hostile submarines and planes. On 11 July she shot down an attacking enemy fighter and on 13 July sailed, arriving at Oran on 16 July.

Knight made escort and patrol runs along the Algerian and Tunisian coasts, then returned to Sicily on 31 July to provide fire support for General George Patton's 7th Army. She operated out of Palermo until 22 August, helping repel several German night-bombing attacks and bombarding targets along the northern coast to Cape d'Orlando. While on an escort run to Malta on 11 August, she rescued two sailors who were knocked overboard Brant when the salvage repair ship, displaying inadequate recognition signals, was shelled and damaged by friendly gunfire the previous day. After escorting convoys between Palermo and Bizerte, Tunisia, Knight returned to Sicily on 7 September for the invasion of Italy.

As flagship for Task Group 80.4 (TG 80.4), Knight closed Ventotene Island off Gaeta, Italy on 8 September, and supported the capture of German and Italian troops on the same day.

Arriving Salerno Bay on 10 September with 87 German prisoners embarked, she fought off enemy air attacks on 10 and 11 September that damaged the cruiser Savannah. The destroyer then supported the taking charge of Capri from Italian authorities on 13 September. During the next two weeks she operated along the coast of Italy in search of enemy submarines and supply convoys; and she guarded transports in the Gulf of Salerno from intermittent air attacks. On 27 September she embarked Rear Admiral Richard L. Conolly and sailed for Tunisia, arriving at Bizerte on 28 September. Proceeding along the North African coast, she departed Oran 30 September for the United States, arriving in New York 9 October.

Between 21 October 1943 and 1 May 1944, Knight engaged in five Atlantic convoy escort runs from New York to ports in the United Kingdom. On 17 May, she again sailed for the Mediterranean from Norfolk, reaching Oran 28 May. For almost ten weeks, she steamed from North Africa to Italy and Gibraltar on antisubmarine patrols and escort missions. Returning to New York from Oran on 22 August, she resumed convoy escort duty to the British Isles 20 September. After two runs to England, she again took up convoy operations in the Mediterranean, making three runs between Norfolk and Oran from 28 December to 2 June 1945.

From 3 June to 24 July Knight was converted to a high-speed minesweeper at Philadelphia Navy Yard. Reclassified DMS-40 on 23 June, she arrived at Norfolk 25 July, received intensive training in minesweeping, and departed 12 August for the Pacific. Steaming via San Diego and Pearl Harbor, she reached Okinawa on 28 September. Assigned to Mine Squadron 21 (MineRon 21), she departed Okinawa 16 October for the Yellow Sea, where she swept for mines from 19 October to 16 November. Her operations between Okinawa and the Japanese home islands continued until 24 February 1946, when she departed Kobe for the United States, arriving at San Francisco 5 April. Knight steamed to Bremerton, Washington from 27 to 30 November and decommissioned 19 March 1947. Reclassified DD-633 on 15 July 1955, Knight was berthed in the Pacific Reserve Fleet at Stockton, California, until she was struck from the Navy List on 1 December 1966. She was sunk as a target off San Diego, California on 27 October 1967.

== Awards ==
Knight received four battle stars for World War II service.
