= USS Doyle (DMS-34) =

Gleaves-class destroyer

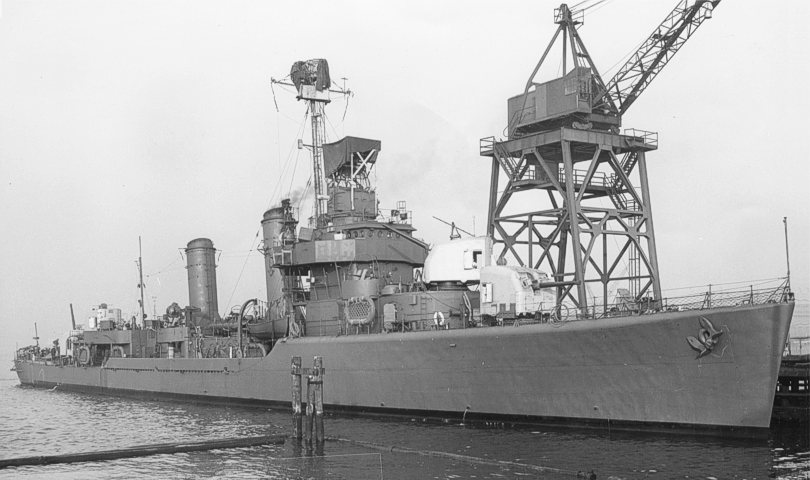
- USS Doyle (DD-494)

History

United States
- Name: Doyle
- Namesake: Richard Doyle
- Builder: Seattle-Tacoma Shipbuilding Corporation
- Laid down: 26 May 1941
- Launched: 17 March 1942
- Commissioned: 27 January 1943
- Identification: DD-494

History
- Reclassified: DMS-34, 23 June 1945
- Decommissioned: 19 May 1955
- Stricken: 1 December 1970
- Fate: Sold 6 October 1972 and; broken up for scrap

General characteristics
- Class & type: Gleaves-class destroyer
- Displacement: 1,630 tons
- Length: 348 ft 3 in (106.15 m)
- Beam: 36 ft 1 in (11.00 m)
- Draft: 11 ft 10 in (3.61 m)
- Propulsion: 50,000 shp (37,000 kW); 4 boilers; 2 propellers
- Speed: 37.4 knots (69 km/h)
- Range: 6,500 nautical miles (12,000 km; 7,500 mi) at 12 kn (22 km/h; 14 mph)
- Complement: 16 officers, 260 enlisted
- Armament: 5 × 5 in (127 mm)/ 38 cal dual purpose guns; 6 × 0.50 in (12.7 mm) guns; 6 × Oerlikon 20 mm cannons; 10 × 21 in (533 mm) torpedo tubes, 2 × depth charge tracks

USS Doyle (DD-494/DMS-34), was a Gleaves-class destroyer of the United States Navy.

== Namesake ==
Richard Doyle entered the Navy on board the schooner USS Enterprise on 25 August 1803 at Malta. On 14 November 1803 he was promoted to quarter gunner. Doyle volunteered for the expedition under Lieutenant Stephen Decatur, Jr., which entered the harbor of Tripoli and destroyed the captured U.S. frigate USS Philadelphia on 16 February 1804 during the First Barbary War. Doyle later served on the frigate USS John Adams and died 27 June 1807 while serving on the sloop-of-war USS Wasp.

== Construction and commissioning ==
Doyle was launched on 17 March 1942 by Seattle-Tacoma Shipbuilding Co., Seattle, Washington; sponsored by Mrs. C. M. Maloney. The ship was commissioned on 27 January 1943.

== Service history ==
=== World War II ===
Doyle reached New York from Bremerton on 26 April 1943. Between 13 May and 29 November, she made four voyages as a convoy escort: Two to Casablanca, French Morocco, one to Greenock, Scotland, and one to Derry, Northern Ireland. For the next few months she served on the Atlantic Coast, in antisubmarine operations and training exercises and cruised to the Caribbean in the screen of the escort carrier Bataan.

Doyle put out from Casco Bay, Maine, 18 April 1944, and arrived at Plymouth, England, ten days later to prepare for the invasion of Normandy. On 5 June, she sortied with the 31st Minesweeping Flotilla to clear the assault area. She gave fire support to the landing forces on D-Day, 6 June, received on board 37 survivors of LCIs 93 and 487, and served on patrol until returning to Plymouth on 15 July for brief overhaul.

Sailing 1 August 1944 for Oran, Doyle departed from that port ten days later for the invasion of southern France, escorting a convoy to the assault area and patrolling to cover the landings. She continued to support the invasion by escorting convoys from Naples and patrolling off Marseille until 21 September when she sailed for the United States, arriving at New York 3 October for overhaul.

Doyle made three more voyages to escort convoys to north Africa between 3 January and 10 June 1945. She arrived at Norfolk on 20 June for conversion to a highspeed minesweeper, and was reclassified DMS-34, 23 June 1945. After conversion, she sailed from Norfolk 27 August for the Pacific, calling at San Diego, Pearl Harbor, and Okinawa, and arriving at Sasebo 24 October. She served in the Far East on occupation duty, at Sasebo as flagship for Commander, Mine Force, Pacific, for most of her tour returning to San Francisco on 31 March 1946. Thereafter, she operated on the west coast and in the western Pacific 18 August 1947 to 19 April 1948.

=== Korean War ===
On 30 June 1950, five days after the North Koreans crossed the 38th parallel, Doyle headed west from San Diego to support United Nations operations in Korea. She escorted troop transports from Sasebo to Korean ports and screened aircraft carriers providing air support for the ground troops. On 15 September 1950, an attempt by 800 South Korean guerrillas to make a secret landing for a raid on the enemy's rear lines went awry when their LST broached and stranded. Doyle screened the 2-day rescue near Changsadong.

After brief overhaul at Sasebo, Doyle sailed on 29 September 1950 to sweep mines on the east coast of Korea in preparation for the invasion landings near Wonsan. On 12 October, she bombarded Rei To Island in support of an underwater demolition team from Diachenko, then was assigned to clear the approaches to Wonsan Harbor. She continued operations in the Wonsan area, as well as sweeping in the Hungnam area, acting as fire-support ship for Korean landings at Suwon Dan on 3 November, and directing a check sweep of Wonsan by Japanese sweepers from 12 to 17 November until returning to Sasebo 20 November.

Doyle continued to operate from Sasebo to Korean waters, sweeping a special fire-support area used to cover the emergency evacuation from Hungnam between 2 and 23 December 1950. She returned to San Diego 4 March 1951, and after overhaul resumed local operations on the west coast. Doyle served again in United Nations operations in Korean waters between 5 October 1951 and 8 August 1952. She returned to the western Pacific between 2 February and 21 July 1953, visiting Midway, Guam, Kwajalein, and various ports in the Philippines, as well as serving as station ship at Hong Kong for five weeks.

Doyle arrived at Charleston, South Carolina, 7 September 1953 from Long Beach, California. She operated along the east coast and served in the Mediterranean with the 6th Fleet between 5 January and 27 May 1954 before going into reserve, in commissioned status, in October 1954. Doyle was placed out of commission in reserve 19 May 1955 at Orange, Texas. Sold for scrap 6 October 1972.

== Awards ==
Doyle received two battle stars for World War II

European–African–Middle Eastern Campaign Medal

6 Jun 44 – 25 Jun 44 E5 Invasion of Normandy (including bombardment of Cherbourg)

15 Aug 44 – 25 Sep 44 E-7 Invasion of Southern France

and 6 for Korean War service.

21 Jul-2 Nov 50 K1

3 Nov-30 Dec 50 K2

30 Jan-4 Feb 51 K4

7–27 Nov 51 K6

28 Nov 51-3 Feb 52 K7

21–23 Feb 52 K7

25–28 Feb 52 K7

14–15 Apr 52 K7

17–30 Apr 52 K7

1–28 May 52 K8

7–22 Jun 52 K8

Only one star is authorized for participation in one or more engagements with the same code.

- World War II Victory Medal
- American Campaign Medal
- Navy Occupation Service Medal

13 Oct 45 - 12 Mar 46 asia clasp

24 Feb 48 asia clasp

- China Service Medal 2 Sep 47 - 7 Apr 48
- Korean Service Medal
- United Nations Service Medal Korea
- National Defense Service Medal
