= USS Southard =

Clemson-class destroyer

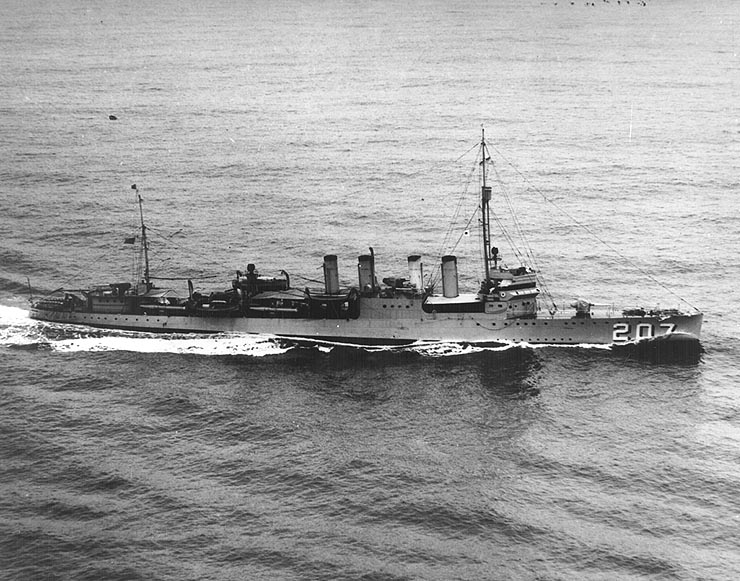
- USS Southard (DD-207) underway on 20 April 1932.

History

United States
- Namesake: Samuel L. Southard
- Builder: William Cramp & Sons, Philadelphia
- Yard number: 473
- Laid down: 18 August 1918
- Launched: 31 March 1919
- Commissioned: 24 September 1919
- Decommissioned: 7 February 1922
- Recommissioned: 6 January 1930
- Reclassified: Destroyer minesweeper, DMS-10, 19 October 1940
- Decommissioned: 5 December 1945
- Stricken: 8 January 1946
- Honors and awards: 10 × battle stars
- Fate: Wrecked 9 October 1945; Wreck destroyed 14 January 1946

General characteristics
- Class & type: Clemson-class destroyer
- Displacement: 1,215 tons
- Length: 314 ft 4 1/2 in (95.82 m)
- Beam: 31 ft 11 1/2 in (9.741 m)
- Draft: 9 ft 4 in (2.84 m)
- Propulsion: 26,500 SHP (20 MW); geared turbines, 2 screws
- Speed: 35 kn (65 km/h)
- Range: 4,900 nm @ 15 kn (9,100 km at 28 km/h)
- Complement: 122 officers and enlisted
- Armament: 4 × 4 in (100 mm) guns, 1 × 3 in (76 mm) gun, 12 × 21-inch (533 mm) torpedo tubes

USS Southard (DD-207/DMS-10) was a Clemson-class destroyer in the United States Navy during World War II. She was the second Navy ship named for Secretary of the Navy Samuel L. Southard (1787–1842).

== Construction and commissioning ==
Southard was laid down on 18 August 1918 at Philadelphia, Pennsylvania, by William Cramp & Sons; launched on 31 March 1919, sponsored by Miss Francesca Lewis Steward; and was commissioned on 24 September 1919.

== Service history ==
=== 1919–1940 ===
During the early fall of 1919, Southard completed fitting-out and steamed for the Florida coast for shakedown. She next headed for New York City to join six other destroyers in escorting the British battlecruiser Renown out to sea as that warship departed carrying Edward, the Prince of Wales, after his visit to the United States. On 19 November 1919, Southard departed Newport, Rhode Island, for duty with U.S. naval forces in the eastern Mediterranean. For about a year, she operated in the Adriatic Sea. She then departed the Dalmatian coast, transited the Suez Canal, and, after calling at ports in Egypt, Arabia, India, and China, put in at Cavite in the Philippines on 16 February 1921. Southard underwent repairs at Cavite Navy Yard until 21 March 1921, when she resumed operations. On 27 August 1922, she departed for the United States, and she arrived in San Francisco, California, on 2 October 1921. From there, she moved on to San Diego, California, where she was decommissioned on 7 February 1922.

After almost seven years in reserve, Southard was recommissioned on 6 January 1930. She operated off the United States West Coast throughout 1930 and in the vicinity of the Panama Canal during the first months of 1931. For the next nine years, Southard continued operations in the Pacific Ocean with the Battle Force. The only exceptions to this schedule came in 1934 and 1939, when she made short cruises in the Atlantic Ocean. In 1940, she was converted to a destroyer minesweeper, and accordingly on 19 October 1940 she was reclassified DMS-10.

=== World War II ===
Stationed at Pearl Harbor, Hawaii, Southard departed that base on 5 December 1941 to participate in exercises in the vicinity of Johnston Island. Southard was still at sea when World War II broke out in the Pacific on 7 December 1941 with the Japanese attack on Pearl Harbor. She returned to Pearl Harbor on 9 December 1941, and thereafter patrolled the approaches to Pearl Harbor until 23 January 1942.

==== 1942 ====
After escorting a convoy to San Francisco and back, Southard resumed patrols in Hawaiian waters on 15 February 1942. On 20 May 1942, she again left Pearl Harbor in the screen of an eastbound convoy. The ships reached San Francisco on the 31 May 1942, and Southard spent the next 10 days undergoing limited repairs in the Mare Island Navy Yard. She returned to Pearl Harbor on 1 July 1942. On 10 July 1942, she stood out for the South Pacific.

Stopping along the way at both British Samoa and American Samoa, Southard arrived at Tongatapu, Tonga, on 22 July 1942. She departed on 25 July 1942, stopped at Efate Island in the New Hebrides, and made Guadalcanal by 7 August 1942, the first day of the Guadalcanal campaign. Southard participated in the opening bombardment of Florida Island, then joined the minesweeping force in a sweep to the south of Gavutu Island and through Lengo Channel. On 8 August, about 20 Japanese high-altitude bombers attacked the transport area, and Southard succeeded in shooting down at least one Japanese plane.

When the beachhead on Guadalcanal had been successfully established, Southard settled down to a routine of screening convoys from New Caledonia and the New Hebrides to the Solomon Islands. For almost eight months, she steamed back and forth between Espiritu Santo, Efate, Nouméa, Tulagi, Purvis Bay, and Guadalcanal. There were frequent Japanese air attacks, and Japanese submarines prowled the sea lanes.

Early on the morning of 10 November 1942, while passing between San Cristobal and Guadalcanal en route to Aola Bay on Guadalcanal, Southard encountered the Japanese submarine I-172 operating on the surface. She immediately slowed to 10 knots (19 km/h; 12 mph) and opened fire. I-172 submerged, and Southard commenced her first depth-charge attack. Southard lost contact with I-172 and did not regain it again until 06:07, almost three and one-half hours later. Over the next three hours Southard made five more depth-charge runs. After the last barrage, she sighted oil on the surface. She moved in to investigate. Upon reaching the oil slick, Southard's crew could find no further evidence of damage, and she steamed on through the slick. When she reached a point about 2,000 yards (1,830 m) on the other side of the slick, the submarine surfaced almost vertically, exposing her whole conning tower, her hull forward of the tower, and part of her keel. Then the bow dropped about 10 degrees, and the submarine sank rapidly by the stern. Though absolute confirmation of a kill was never received, all evidence strongly indicated that the submarine had indeed sunk.

==== 1943 ====
Following a liberty and recreation excursion to Brisbane, Australia, and six days in drydock at Sydney, Australia, Southard returned to patrol and convoy duty in early January 1943. On 20 March 1943, she stood out of Nouméa in company with the destroyers Hovey and Stringham and the fleet tug Sonoma, which was towing the destroyer Aulick. This task unit stopped at Suva Harbor in Fiji on 25 March 1943 and departed the next day to continue on to Pago Pago, Pearl Harbor, and ultimately San Francisco. Southard entered the Mare Island Navy Yard on 19 April 1943 and remained there until 8 June 1943. By 15 June 1943, she was in Pearl Harbor again, and on 24 June 1943 she headed back toward the South Pacific. She reached Dumbéa Bay, New Caledonia, on 6 July 1943.

Her return to the Southwest Pacific meant a resumption of patrol and convoy escort duty to support the continuing Solomon Islands campaign. which by this time had progressed farther north. On 30 October 1943, she joined a convoy off Tetere Point, Guadalcanal, and steamed for Bougainville. The convoy arrived off Cape Torokina on 31 October 1943, and Southard joined other elements of the fleet in bombarding Bougainville. On 1 November 1943, U.S. troops landed on the island, beginning the Bougainville campaign. After minesweeping operations in Empress Augusta Bay, she made for Florida Island, entering Purvis Bay on 3 November 1943. On 7 November 1943, she returned to Bougainville to investigate the shoals along the approaches to Empress Augusta Bay. Then she resumed patrols off Guadalcanal.

These patrols and cruises with convoys occupied Southard's time until 21 November 1943, when she passed through Lengo Channel bound for Nouméa. From 25 November to 16 December 1943, Southard stayed in the vicinity of New Caledonia, participating in drills and screening ships coming into and out of Nouméa. On 17 December 1943, she entered Suva Harbor with a convoy. On 19 December 1943, she got underway for Guadalcanal.

==== 1944 ====
Upon her return to the Solomons, she took up the familiar routine of patrols and screening supply ships. On 22 January 1944, while she en route from Florida Island to Espiritu Santo escorting the oiler Cache, a Japanese submarine torpedoed the Cache. Cache was damaged and Southard covered her retirement to Espiritu Santo.

In late February 1944, Southard visited Auckland, New Zealand. She returned to the Solomons in March 1944, patrolled the Guadalcanal area, and conducted exercises in the Russell Islands. Her field of operations was expanded in April and May 1944 to include parts of the Bismarck Archipelago as she began escorting convoys to Borgen Bay on New Britain. By 10 May 1944, she was back in Espiritu Santo. On 17 May 1944, she departed for the United States and an overhaul. She took on fuel at Funafuti on 19 May 1944, provisioned and fueled at Pearl Harbor on the 24 and 25 May 1944, and entered San Francisco Bay on 31 May 1944. Southard commenced overhaul at the Mare Island Navy Yard on 1 June 1944.

After the completion of her overhaul, Southard arrived at Pearl Harbor on 5 August 1944. On 12 August 1944, she sortied as part of a task group which also included six escort aircraft carriers and five other destroyer-type ships, bound for the Solomons. On 24 August 1944, the task group entered Purvis Bay. Southard stood out again on 25 August 1944 for exercises in the Russell Islands.

On 4 September 1944, Southard rendezvoused with a task force off Guadalcanal, arrived in the Palau Islands on 12 September 1944, and swept mines off the coasts of Peleliu and Angaur in preparation for the invasion of Peleliu on 15 September 1944 and of Angaur on 17 September 1944. On 24 September 1944, she fueled and replenished at Manus in the Admiralty Islands, then returned to the Palaus for patrols and screening duties. She reentered Seeadler Harbor on 4 October 1944 to prepare for the invasion of the Philippines at Leyte.

Southard sortied from Manus with the Dinagat Attack Force on 10 October 1944 and began sweeping Leyte Gulf on the 18 October 1944. She swept mines in the gulf again on the 19 October and made an exploratory sweep of Surigao Strait on the 20 October. On 24 October, when the Battle of Leyte Gulf began, she joined the screen of Carrier Task Group 77.4 and remained so employed until the 26 October 1944. Back in Seeadler Harbor by 30 October 1944, Southard spent all of November and most of December 1944 engaged in drills and undergoing repairs at Manus.

On 27 December 1944, Southard rendezvoused with Task Group 77.6 and headed for Leyte Gulf. From there, the task group moved on to Luzon and the Lingayen assault.

==== 1945 ====
Southard began minesweeping operations in Lingayen Gulf on 6 January 1945. Late that afternoon she was attacked by Japanese kamikaze aircraft, and one of them crashed into Southard abaft her stacks. The plane's engine embedded itself in the ship while its fuselage ricocheted off her starboard side, tearing a trough 6 feet (1.8 m) wide in her deck as it went. Southard quickly cut loose her sweep gear and retired to make emergency repairs. Within 14 hours, she was back in action sweeping mines. She continued operations for five more days before departing the Lingayen area. She returned to San Pedro Bay between Leyte and Samar on 14 January 1945 for further repairs.

On 4 February 1945, Southard headed east toward Hawaii. She stopped at Ulithi Atoll on 6 February 1945 and at Guam on 8 February 1945. She departed the Mariana Islands on 13 February 1945 and continued to Pearl Harbor, where she underwent extensive repairs. She did not leave Hawaiian waters until 4 May 1945. She stopped at Eniwetok on the 12 May 1945, then, in company with the attack transports Clinton and Buckingham, continued on to the Marianas. On 21 May 1945, she steamed from Guam to Saipan and, on 23 May 1945, got underway for Okinawa, where the Battle of Okinawa had been raging since 1 April 1945.

On the day of her arrival at Nakagusuku Bay (also known as Buckner Bay) at Okinawa, Southard almost suffered another suicide crash as an attacking kamikaze hit the sea about 15 yards (14 m) ahead of her. For the next three months, she swept mines, screened transports, and delivered mail to the fire support units around Okinawa. On 15 August 1945, hostilities between the United States and the Japanese Empire ceased.

=== Post-World War II ===
Southard remained in the Ryukyu Islands for the rest of August 1945, undergoing inspection and survey. By 15 September 1945, the survey team determined that she should be moved to the rear area for further inspection and repair. However, on 17 September 1945, while maneuvering at anchor during Typhoon Ida, her screws were fouled by a drifting antisubmarine net, and she grounded on a pinnacle reef off Tsuken Shima, an island a few miles east of southern Okinawa. She was floated clear of the reef, and her propellers were cleared by divers on 18 September 1945.

While still waiting to move to the rear area, Southard was wrecked on another reef about 1,000 yards (910 m) southwest of Tsuken Shima on 9 October 1945 during Typhoon Louise. On 10 October 1945, her officers and crew, save the commanding officer and a skeleton crew, were removed.

== Decommissioning and disposal ==
Southard was declared a total loss, and on 5 December 1945 she was decommissioned. She was struck from the Navy list on 8 January 1946. A demolition crew destroyed her wreck on 14 January 1946.

== Awards ==
- American Defense Service Medal with "FLEET" clasp
- Asiatic-Pacific Campaign Medal with 10 battle stars
- World War II Victory Medal

== In popular culture ==
During the Okinawa campaign, after May 1945, Herman Wouk, author of The Caine Mutiny, served aboard Southard as her executive officer. Like the protagonist of his novel, he had been recommended to command Southard on her voyage home before she was wrecked on 9 October 1945. He also named a minor character in the novel after Southard. Other parts of the novel are loosely based on Wouk's earlier experiences from 1943 to 1945 as a lieutenant aboard USS Zane (DMS-14), another Clemson-class destroyer minesweeper that had duty in the Marshall Islands and the Mariana Islands like Wouk's fictional ship USS Caine.
