= USS Trever =

Clemson-class destroyer

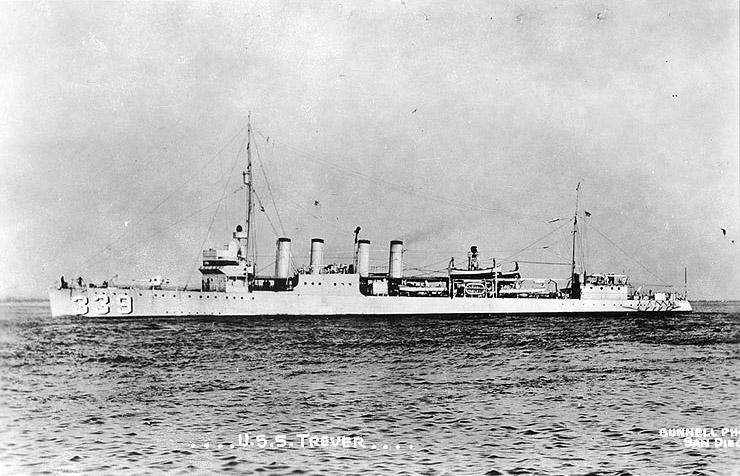
- USS Trever (DD-339) off the coast of California while serving with Destroyer Division 10, Battle Force, circa 1931.

History

United States
- Namesake: Lieutenant Commander George A. Trever
- Builder: Mare Island Naval Shipyard
- Laid down: 12 August 1919
- Launched: 15 September 1920
- Commissioned: 3 August 1922
- Decommissioned: January 1923
- Recommissioned: 2 June 1930
- Reclassified: Destroyer minesweeper, DMS-16,19 November 1940; Miscellaneous auxiliary, AG-110, 4 June 1945
- Decommissioned: 23 November 1945
- Stricken: 5 December 1945
- Fate: Sold for scrapping 12 November 1946

General characteristics
- Class & type: Clemson-class destroyer
- Displacement: 1,308 tons
- Length: 314 feet 4 1/2 inches (95.822 m)
- Beam: 30 feet 11 1/2 inches (9.436 m)
- Draft: 9 feet 10 inches (3.00 m)
- Propulsion: 26,500 shp (20 MW); geared turbines, 2 screws
- Speed: 35 knots (65 km/h)
- Range: 4,900 nmi (9,100 km); @ 15 kt
- Complement: 122 officers and enlisted
- Armament: 4 × 4 in (100 mm) guns, 1 × 3 in (76 mm) gun, 12 × 21 inch (533 mm) tt.

USS Trever (DD-339/DMS-16/AG-110) was a Clemson-class destroyer of the United States Navy in commission from 1922 to 1923 and from 1930 to 1945. Converted to a destroyer minesweeper in 1940, she served in the Pacific throughout World War II, including during the Japanese attack on Pearl Harbor, the Guadalcanal campaign, and the New Georgia campaign.

Trever was named in memory of Lieutenant Commander George A. Trever. No other U.S. Navy ship has been named Trever.

== Construction and commissioning ==
Trever was built at the Mare Island Navy Yard in California. She was launched on 15 September 1920, sponsored by Mrs. Bess McMillan Trever (George Trever's widow) and was commissioned on 3 August 1922.

== Service history ==
After shakedown, Trever was decommissioned in January 1923. She was recommissioned on 2 June 1930, operating from San Diego, California, with the Battle Force. She was reclassified as a destroyer minesweeper and redesignated DMS-16 on 19 November 1940, after which she was based at Pearl Harbor, Hawaii, in 1941 as part of the Base Force, United States Fleet.

== World War II ==
=== 1941 ===
On the morning of 7 December 1941, when Imperial Japanese Navy aircraft attacked Pearl Harbor, Trever was moored in West Loch at Pearl Harbor with the destroyer minesweepers USS Zane (DMS-14), USS Wasmuth (DMS-15), and USS Perry (DMS-17). She engaged the aircraft with her .50-caliber Browning machine guns, was responsible for shooting one down, and contributed with her sister ships to another plane's demise. She hurriedly sortied, putting to sea under the command of the captain of the destroyer USS Henley (DD-391), as many commanding officers were not able to reach their ships before they sortied. Trever's commanding officer, Lieutenant Commander Dwight Agnew, who had gone to sea on board Wasmuth, was able to rejoin Trever later that day. Trever spent the rest of 1941 and the beginning of 1942 conducting minesweeping operations, local escort missions, and antisubmarine patrols.

=== 1942 ===
On 28 January 1942 Trever was in the Alenuihaha Channel off Maui′s Hana Coast 30 nautical miles (56 km; 35 mi) north of ʻUpolu Point, the northernmost point on the island of Hawaii, escorting a two-ship convoy on a voyage from Kahului, Maui, to Hilo, Hawaii, consisting of the 622-ton United States Army Transport USAT General Royal T. Frank and the small cargo ship Kalae with a barge in tow. At dawn, the Japanese submarine I-71 fired two torpedoes at General Royal T. Frank which missed. I-71 then fired a third torpedo that struck the transport, which exploded and sank in less than 30 seconds. Of the 60 people aboard — including 26 United States Army recruits — Kalae rescued 36. I-71 escaped.

After escorting a convoy from Honolulu to California, Trever was refitted at Mare Island Navy Yard, with her 4-inch (102 mm) guns replaced by 3-inch (76.2 mm) antiaircraft (AA) guns and 20 mm guns Oerlikon cannons.

Trever next saw action in the first U.S. amphibious assault of the war against the Solomon Islands with the aim of securing Guadalcanal. At first she screened transports and then joined the bombardment of a Japanese shore battery on the island of Gavutu; she scored a direct hit and the battery was destroyed. Later she used her antiaircraft guns to drive off Japanese bombers that had attacked transport ships. The following day Trever shot down four twin-engined Mitsubishi G4M (Allied reporting name "Betty") bombers.

On that evening, 9 August, a Japanese cruiser force conducted a surprise attack on the Allied (US and Australian) fleet, resulting in the Battle of Savo Island. The outcome was a very heavy defeat for the Allies, with four heavy cruisers sunk and one severely damaged. However, the Japanese fleet did not press its advantage and the vulnerable transports supporting the invasion escaped unscathed. As a result of the battle, the Allied warships withdrew and the transports, whose withdrawal Trever helped to screen, retreated to New Caledonia.

The invasion was subsequently supported by high-speed transport and destroyer minesweepers, including Trever herself. Her first mission was from Espiritu Santo to Guadalcanal, loaded with reinforcements and supplies for the hard-pressed U.S. Marines on Guadalcanal. After hastily unloading she retired toward Nouméa, arriving there on 22 September. After escorting a further high-speed convoy to replenish land forces engaged on the Solomons she was deployed to search for survivors of the Battle of Cape Esperance, fought on the night of 12 October 1942. During the day's search, Trever took on board 34 Japanese survivors, including three officers. One raft of eight refused to surrender and put up a fight, giving Trever no recourse but to destroy it and its occupants. Trever then transferred her prisoners to the attack transport USS McCawley (APA-4) and headed back to Espiritu Santo escorting the returning transports.

After completing another resupply mission, on 25 October, Trever had been expecting orders to bombard Japanese positions along Guadalcanal's coast. However, an intercepted message informed Lieutenant Commander Agnew of Trever that three Japanese destroyers were approaching, apparently to bombard the airstrip at Henderson Field on Guadalcanal. Two choices were open to Agnew, who was commanding a task unit consisting of Trever and Zane. One was to head for the Maliala River to join the gunboat USS Jamestown (PG-55) and the damaged seaplane tender USS McFarland (AVD-14) which were both well camouflaged. By following this plan, Zane and Trever, both uncamouflaged, might attract the Japanese into the area and raise a strong possibility of the destruction of all four highly vulnerable American ships. Accordingly, the ships attempted the alternative, a dash for safety.

The two old destroyer minesweepers got underway and accelerated as fast as possible to clear the area. Some 15 minutes later the Japanese destroyers' silhouettes came over the horizon, hull-down and travelling at high speed. The American ships could manage only 29 knots (33 mph; 54 km/h) and the Japanese, making 35 knots (40 mph; 65 km/h), gained rapidly and opened fire with their 5.5-inch (140 mm) guns while still out of range of the Americans' 3-inch (76.2 mm) armament. The first enemy shells overshot and sent up fountains of water several hundred yards ahead of the destroyer minesweepers; the next salvo fell some 300 yards (270 m) astern. The American ships used evasive action and returned fire from their 3-inch (76.2 mm) guns as Japanese salvos exploded in the sea nearby. The Japanese then hit Zane amidships, killing three men.

Agnew now decided that his ships' best chance of survival would come from attempting to make a high-speed transit of shoal-studded Niella Channel. Just as the Americans were changing course, the Japanese broke off the action, perhaps remembering their primary mission.

After continuing resupply runs through January 1943, Trever steamed to Australia for overhaul, arriving at Sydney on 27 January 1943.

=== 1943 ===
Trever returned to Espiritu Santo on 28 February 1943 before calling at Wellington, New Zealand, on 31 May 1943. Returning to escort duties, she accompanied the tank landing ship USS LST-343 from Lungga Roads to the Russell Islands on 20 June 1943. After nightfall, a Japanese twin-float biplane seaplane came over and dropped bombs on the two ships, sending them to general quarters and provoking return fire from Trever′s 20-millimeter guns.

Trever next took part in operations in the New Georgia campaign. On 29 June 1943, Rear Admiral George H. Fort raised his flag on Trever as Commander, Task Group 31.3. That night, in company with the high-speed transports USS Schley (APD-14) and USS McKean (APD-5) and seven infantry landing craft (LCIs), Trever departed Wernham Cove in the Russell Islands. At daybreak the next morning, the high-speed transports launched their landing boats. The troops landed at Oliana Bay on New Georgia, taking the Japanese defenders by surprise. Later that day, with the objective secured, Rear Admiral Fort disembarked at Renard Sound ending Trever's brief role as flagship.

On 5 July 1943, American forces attacked at Kula Gulf to occupy Rice Anchorage and thus to prevent Japanese reinforcements from reaching Munda from Vila. Trever transported infantry and joined bombardment and transport groups in the assault.

On 5 August 1943, Trever joined the light cruiser USS Honolulu (CL-48), which had lost her bow to a Japanese Type 93 "Long Lance" torpedo during the Battle of Kolombangara, and escorted her from Espiritu Santo to Pearl Harbor. On 19 August 1943, Trever got underway to escort an eastbound convoy to San Francisco, California.

After a month's overhaul at Mare Island Navy Yard, Trever steamed for Pearl Harbor on 8 October 1943 and touched there briefly before heading for Guadalcanal. On 11 November 1943, she joined the screen for the transport USS American Legion (AP-35) and escorted her to Empress Augusta Bay off Bougainville Island. Later that month, Trever took part in the landings at Cape Torokina on Bougainville, which began the Bougainville campaign.

=== 1944 ===
Trever devoted the next year to escort missions and target towing duty in the South and Central Pacific. Perhaps the highlight of this service came in October 1944 when she joined the screen for the torpedoed light cruiser USS Houston (CL-81) and heavy cruiser USS Canberra (CA-70) and escorted them safely to Ulithi Atoll.

On 18 December 1944, as she was escorting a convoy toward the Western Caroline Islands, Trever was caught in a typhoon. Visibility dropped to zero due to torrential rains, with mountainous waves and 90-knot (100 mph; 170 km/h) winds. At 16:30, a man making emergency repairs topside was washed overboard, and Trever immediately began a search for the missing sailor. Two hours later, she picked up her man: bruised, battered, and in shock — but alive.

The following day, Trever put into Guam and transferred her injured sailor to the naval hospital. On 22 December 1944, she reached Eniwetok. On 24 December 1944, she and U.S. Army Transport USAT Santa Isabel got underway for Hawaii, arriving at Pearl Harbor on 31 December 1944. Trever reached the Naval Repair Base, San Diego, California, and began overhaul on 9 January 1945.

=== 1945 ===
Upon completion of her repairs, Trever headed for Oahu on 25 March 1945. For the remainder of the war, Trever operated out of Pearl Harbor, where she had entered the hostilities with Japan four years before. On 4 June 1945, she was reclassified as a miscellaneous auxiliary and designated as AG-110.

On 22 September 1945, Trever departed Pearl Harbor for the last time and steamed to San Diego. After repairs, she proceeded via the Panama Canal to Norfolk, Virginia, where she arrived on 21 October 1945. She was decommissioned on 23 November 1945, struck from the Navy list on 5 December 1945, and sold for scrapping on 12 November 1946.

== Honors ==
Trever received five battle stars for her World War II service.
