= USS Zane =

Clemson-class destroyer

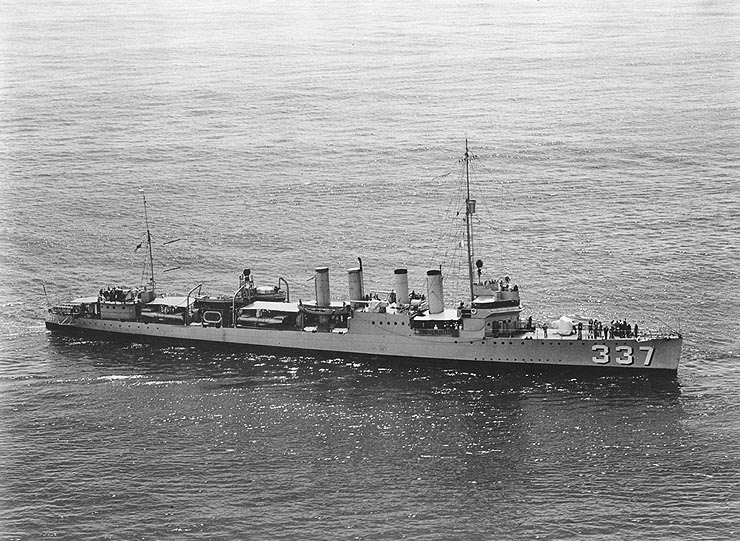

History

United States
- Namesake: Randolph Zane
- Builder: Mare Island Naval Shipyard
- Laid down: 15 January 1919
- Launched: 12 August 1919
- Commissioned: 15 February 1921
- Decommissioned: 14 December 1945
- Stricken: 8 January 1946
- Fate: Sold for scrap, 3 March 1947

General characteristics
- Class & type: Clemson-class destroyer
- Displacement: 1,215 tons
- Length: 314 feet 4 1/2 inches (95.822 m)
- Beam: 30 feet 11 1/2 inches (9.436 m)
- Draft: 9 ft 4 in (2.84 m)
- Propulsion: 26,500 shp (20 MW); geared turbines, 2 screws
- Speed: 35 knots (65 km/h)
- Range: 4,900 nmi (9,100 km); @ 15-knot (28 km/h)
- Complement: 122 officers and enlisted
- Armament: 4 × 4 in (100 mm) guns, 1 × 3 in (76 mm) gun, 12 × 21 inch (533 mm) torpedo tubes

USS Zane (DD-337/DMS-14/AG-109) was a Clemson-class destroyer in the United States Navy following World War I. She was named for Randolph Zane.

== History ==
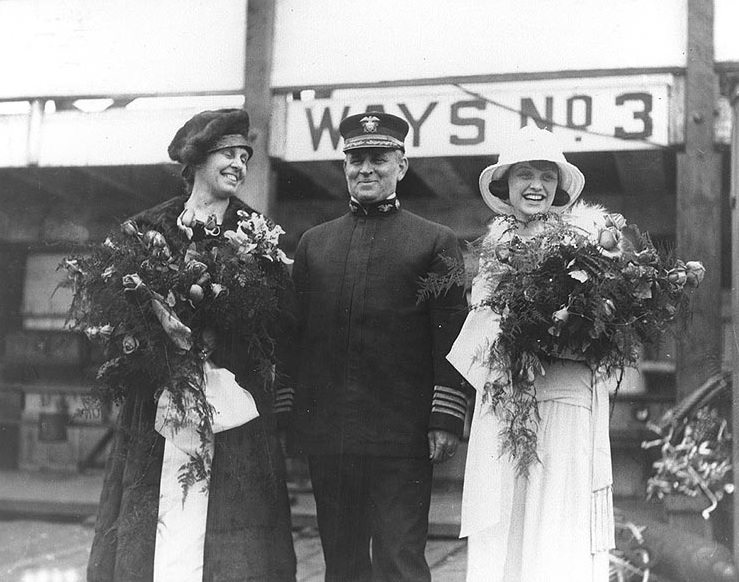
Miss Marjorie Zane (right) and her mother, Mrs. Barbara Zane (daughter of California governor William D. Stephens) at the christening of the USS Zane.

Zane was laid down on 15 January 1919 at the Mare Island Navy Yard, Vallejo, California; launched on 12 August 1919; sponsored by Miss Marjorie Zane, the daughter of Major R. T. Zane; re-classified DD-337 on 17 July 1920; and commissioned at Mare Island on 15 February 1921.

=== 1920s ===
After fitting out and shakedown, Zane fueled at Port Costa, California, late in June 1921 and sailed northward to the Puget Sound Navy Yard, Bremerton, Washington, for stores. Returning south to Mare Island once more, Zane joined Destroyer Division 14 at San Francisco, California, on 22 June and departed that port the following day, bound for the Asiatic Station.

Sailing via Pearl Harbor, Midway, and Guam, Zane reached Cavite, Philippine Islands, on 24 August. The destroyer then operated in the Philippines—out of Cavite, Manila, Olongapo, and Lingayen Gulf—on maneuvers and exercises through the spring of 1922. She departed Manila on 3 June 1922, bound for Chinese waters.

Zane reached the Yangtze estuary on 6 June and, while steaming to the mouth of the Huangpu River, en route to Shanghai, spotted the Chinese river steamer Tse Kiang approaching from the starboard quarter. She maintained course and speed, doing nothing to avoid a collision. Zane attempted to avoid a fouling when that seemed imminent, but too late. At 1158, Tse Kiang rammed the destroyer aft.

Fortunately, the damage was minor; and Zane proceeded on her way, reaching Shanghai two and a half hours later and moored alongside sistership Rathburne (DD-113) at the American buoys. Zane entered the Yangtsepoo drydock on 15 June for repairs and was undocked on the following day.

Underway for Yantai on 5 July, Zane reached that North China port on the 7th and remained there until the 30th, when she shifted to Qinhuangdao, the seaport at the base of the Great Wall of China, to send leave parties to Beijing. She lay at Qinhuangdao from 31 July to 5 August, when she got underway to return to Yantai on the latter day.

Zane set sail from Yantai, homeward bound, on 25 August and visited Nagasaki, Japan, on the first leg of her voyage back to the west coast of the United States. Subsequently, touching at Midway and Pearl Harbor, the destroyer reached San Francisco on 2 October. Shifting to the Mare Island Navy Yard on 9 October, Zane turned in all torpedoes, torpedo gear, and landing force equipment over the three days that ensued. She then fueled at Martinez, California, before reaching San Diego and San Pedro. Decommissioned at San Diego on 1 February 1923, Zane remained on "Red Lead Row" for seven years.

=== 1930s ===
Recommissioned on 25 February 1930, Zane operated actively as a unit of the Battle Force for the next decade, except for one brief period during which time she was attached to Rotating Reserve Squadron 20 in late 1934. Initially assigned to Destroyer Division 10, Destroyer Squadron 4, Destroyers, Battle Force, Destroyer Flotilla 2, the ship served through the 1930s in a variety of squadrons, but all within the 2nd Destroyer Flotilla.

She participated in some of the inter-war fleet problems - the large-scale fleet maneuvers instituted in the early 1920s to develop equipment and tactics. She ranged from the west coast of the United States into the Caribbean and western Atlantic Ocean, as well as off the Panama Canal Zone.

However, with the new destroyer construction programs turning out more modern, faster, and heavily armed ships, the need to retain the old "flush-deckers" in the destroyer role diminished. At the same time, there grew a need for high-speed minesweepers, fast minelayers, seaplane tenders, and the like to meet the ever-growing demands on the Navy.

=== Destroyer minesweeper (DMS) ===
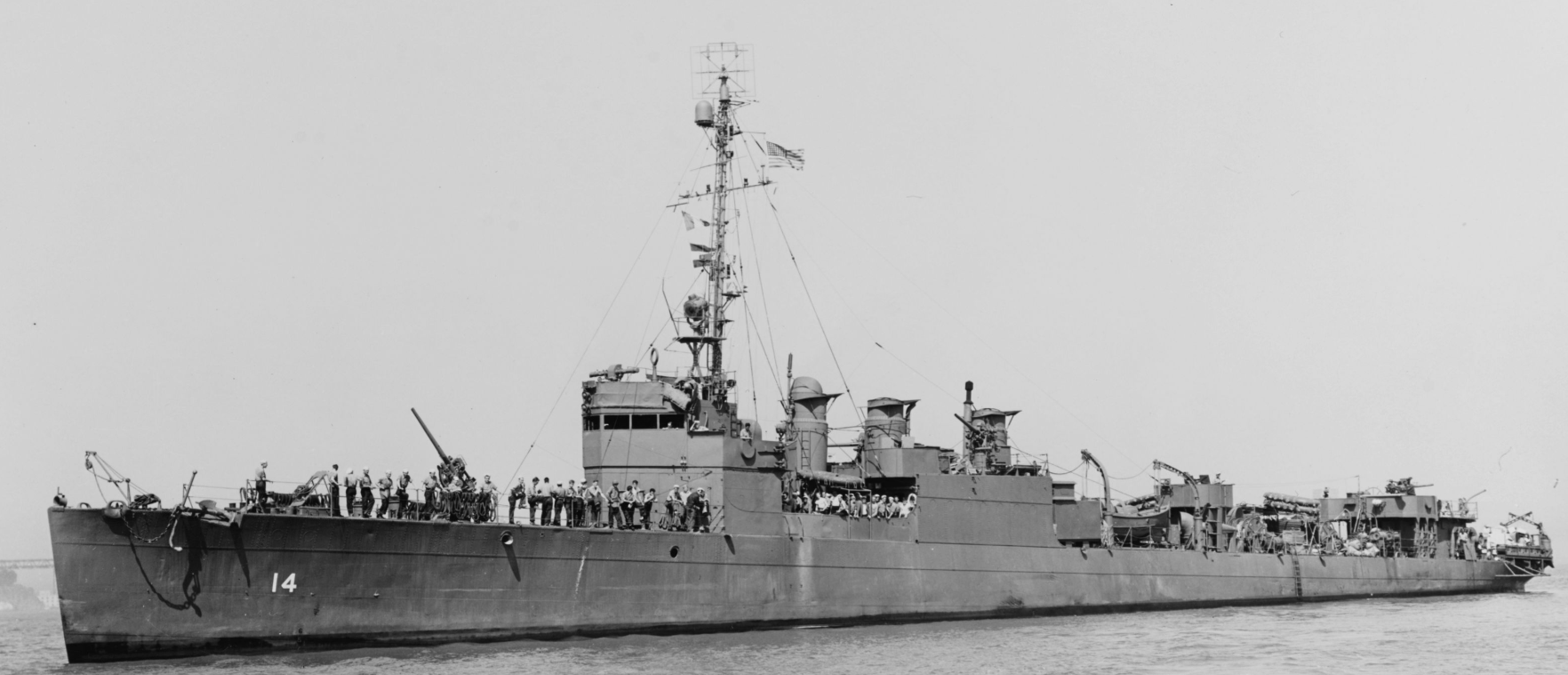
Destroyer/Minesweeper USS Zane (DMS-14) after repair at Mare Island Navy Yard in San Francisco, California in September 1943. Note the three smokestacks of the fully configured minesweeper.

Converted to a high-speed minesweeper at the Pearl Harbor Navy Yard and reclassified as DMS-14 on 19 November 1940, Zane operated primarily in Hawaiian waters on the eve of World War II.

==== Pearl Harbor ====
On the morning of 7 December 1941, she was moored off Pearl City in a nest with her three sisterships of Mine Division 4— Trever (DMS-16), Wasmuth (DMS-15), and Perry (DMS-17).

The crew was just finishing breakfast when, at 0757, a signalman on watch topside observed a single plane drop a bomb on the southern end of Ford Island after a long gliding approach from the northward. Only then did the men topside realize it was a Japanese plane.

With 10 percent of her enlisted men and 25 percent of the officers ashore, Zane went to general quarters and, within three minutes of the initial explosion, had manned her .50-caliber antiaircraft machine gun battery. Her commanding officer, Lt. Cmdr. L. M. LeHardy, was senior officer afloat in the division and reported: "0800 Observed Japanese plane gliding low over Ford Island, enemy character now positive. This was not a drill."

Commencing fire at "any and all planes which passed within a reasonable distance of the nest" Zane began preparations at 0803 for getting underway, as belting and ammunition supply parties turned to. At 0830, Zane spotted a "strange submarine" 200 yards astern of Medusa (AR-1), anchored in nearby berth K-23. Zane's position in the nest, however, rendered her incapable of opening fire with her after 4-inch gun: her aim was fouled by Perry (DMS-17), moored outboard. However, Monaghan (DD-354) soon made the whole problem academic at 0840, when she charged down upon the Japanese type "A" midget submarine and destroyed her by ramming and with depth charges.

Meanwhile, the fleet gradually began to return fire and, by the time the second wave of Japanese planes arrived, the fleet was at action stations. Gunfire from a nearby ship (possibly Medusa) brought down one Japanese plane, whose bomb had burst in the water near Perry. The enemy aircraft exploded into flames on the way down and crashed on shore near the recently completed deperming station to the loud cheers of all hands topside in Zane.

Subsequently, the ships of MinDiv 4 got underway individually and stood out to take up patrol offshore. Zane had suffered no damage from the enemy during the raid, but the melee of "friendly" antiaircraft fire from a number of ships nearby, including some in the nest itself, had severed a number of strands of rigging and antennae.

At 1410, Zane and Wasmuth rigged up a twin-ship, moored-mine sweep with 400 fathoms of wire between them and entered the Pearl Harbor entrance channel at 1547, sweeping up to the vicinity of the gate vessel before the sweep wire parted. Subsequently, returning to sea, Zane resumed antisubmarine patrols, carrying them out at a time when submarine sightings (most of them fictitious) proliferated.

==== 1942 ====
Zane operated locally out of Pearl Harbor into the spring of 1942. She departed the Hawaiian Islands on 5 April, escorting an 8-knot (15 km/h) convoy (number 4079) to San Pedro, Los Angeles. The high-speed minesweeper then underwent repairs and alterations at the Mare Island Navy Yard before she returned to Pearl Harbor in early June.

Meanwhile, the tide of war was beginning to turn. Eight months after Pearl Harbor, the United States Navy was ready to launch its first amphibious operation, codenamed Operation Watchtower. The target was the Japanese-held Solomon Islands, and the operation was to begin on 7 August 1942.

American intelligence knew that numerous unmined areas existed off the objective beachheads, but invasion planners thought it best to at least determine the exact boundaries of any minefields that existed in the areas. Accordingly, Zane and four of her sisterships (Hopkins (DMS-13), Southard (DMS-10), Hovey (DMS-11) and Trever (DMS-16)) —were to sweep an area extending from the 100 fathoms (180 m) curve toward Port Purvis on Florida Island, but split into two groups near Gavutu Island to head simultaneously toward beach "Red," clearing a 1,000 yards (910 m) wide stretch through Lengo Channel toward Indispensable Strait. Japanese shore batteries opened up on the ships, but their fire was erratic and did no damage. By 1550 on the day of the first landings, 7 August, the area had been thoroughly swept. No mines were found.

Over the ensuing weeks, the Battle of Guadalcanal was fought, with the Japanese maintaining themselves on the island. The Americans were compelled to bring in their reinforcements during the daylight hours when they controlled the skies. At night, the Japanese, with their superior night-fighting capabilities, had command of the situation in the Solomons. Zane worked off Tulagi and Guadalcanal, breaking her sweep and patrol operations with periodic upkeep at Nouméa, New Caledonia. On 8 September, during one such sweep operation, the minesweeper watched waves of high flying Japanese planes heading toward Guadalcanal.

Into the autumn, as the fighting ashore became more intense, the need for supplies - particularly aviation gasoline to keep the Cactus Air Force in the air - multiplied. At Espiritu Santo, Zane and her sistership Trever piled drums of aviation gasoline on their decks, together with torpedoes, ammunition and stores, and each with two motor torpedo (PT) boats in tow, set sail for Guadalcanal. They reached Tulagi Harbor at 0530 on 25 October 1942.

Trever completed her unloading by 0700. At 0809, the general air raid alarm sounded from ashore. Trever cast off and stood into the harbor itself; Zane got underway about the same time and lay to about 700 yards ahead of Trever in the shelter of Tulagi, Koko-tambu, and Songoangona Islands.

At 0955, the signal station at Tulagi informed both ships that three enemy ships had been sighted in the straits between Savo and Florida Islands, entering "Iron Bottom Bay." Trever's commanding officer, the task group commander, Commander D. M. Agnew, took a dim view of the recommendation that his ships seek shelter up the Maliala River. Not wanting to be, in his words, "trapped like rats," Agnew elected to run.

Zane and Trever stood out at maximum speed and cleared the channel leading out of Tulagi at 1014. Lookouts noted the stacks and mast-tops of three ships almost simultaneously at 21,000 yards (19 km) distant and bearing 250 degrees, steering a slightly converging course. Within five minutes, the American lookouts noted that the trio of enemy ships had altered course to close.

The three enemy ships (the destroyers Akatsuki, Ikazuchi, and Shiratsuyu) comprised the 1st Attack Unit, dispatched to provide naval gunfire support during the day to Japanese land forces who had hoped to capture Henderson Field. Each of the Japanese ships with their 6 × 5 in (127 mm) guns outgunned their American counterparts who were armed with smaller calibre guns.

At 1020, the enemy formation changed course again to close the range still further and bring their heavier batteries to bear. Zane and Trever, meanwhile, skirted the shoal waters on course for Sealark Channel. Ten minutes later, with the range at approximated 9,200 yards, the Japanese destroyers opened fire, and the running sea fight was on.

The Japanese - in view of their slated mission - were using bombardment ammunition instead of armor-piercing shells. Soon shells began landing disturbingly close to the zigzagging Trever and Zane; the latter, for example, observed one shell land just forward of her bow and one apiece on each side of the forecastle, off the bows. One enemy shell scored a direct hit on Zane, hitting the minesweeper's number 1 × 3 in (76 mm) gun, forward, killing three men instantly. Other shells cut away rigging, antennae, and every halyard except the one to the gaff. That one appropriately flew the national ensign.

Providentially, at 1040, the Japanese ships turned away to engage Seminole (AT-65) and a small patrol craft off Lunga Point. The respite offered the two high-speed minesweepers proved fatal to the fleet tug and the YP as the Japanese ships sank them summarily before retiring, harried by American planes from Henderson Field. Trever and Zane, meanwhile, continued to retire to the eastward. At 1055, the two minecraft changed course to the south and west of San Cristobal Island.

Zane remained in the forward areas of the Southwest Pacific theater through the end of 1942. Again in company with Trever, the high-speed minesweeper towed PT boats of Motor Torpedo Boat Squadron 2 from Nouméa to Espiritu Santo in mid-November. Zane later escorted a convoy from the New Hebrides to Tulagi and Guadalcanal before being sent to Sydney, Australia, in January 1943 for repairs and a rest for her crew.

==== 1943 ====
While at Sydney, Zane was called upon to perform a rescue mission. On 22 January 1943, the Japanese submarine I-21 (a craft with an impressive record of "kills" since scoring her first on Christmas Eve 1941) torpedoed and disabled the American steamship Peter H. Burnett. The next day, Zane received orders to proceed to the last reported position of the crippled steamer.

At 1255 on 25 January, Zane spotted a Royal Australian Air Force (RAAF) Catalina flying boat. She, in turn, led the minesweeper to the location of Peter H. Burnett's lifeboat number three. Apparently, the steamer's crew and passengers had thought the ship would sink as a result of the torpedo damage aft and abandoned her; their ship, however, was still afloat.

Zane took on board 14 men (12 crewmembers including the Master, Charles Darling, and two U.S. Army passengers) at 1330 and altered course to head for the last reported position of the ship from which the men had come. The RAAF Catalina then helpfully radioed the position of the derelict, enabling Zane to reach the scene at 1735. She then transferred, via motor whaleboat, 13 of the men back to their ship; one man had been retained on board Zane under medical treatment for his injuries suffered when the steamer had been torpedoed. The minesweeper then took Peter H. Burnett in tow and pulled her to Sydney, where they both arrived safely on the 27th.

Zane returned to Guadalcanal in late February. In her absence, there had been a change in the situation on that once bitterly contested isle - the Japanese had evacuated it on 7 February and 8 February, leaving it in American hands at last.

With Guadalcanal finally secured, American planners looked toward the Russells, 60 miles (97 km) west northwest of Guadalcanal. These isles were chiefly remembered by visitors for "rain, mud, and magnificent coconuts." The operation code-named Operation Cleanslate, was the first forward island-jumping movement made in the South Pacific.

Zane, as part of Task Unit (TU) 61.1.3, towed four landing craft (two LCVP's, one LCV and an LCM) to the objective area. As part of the "Spit Kit Expeditionary Force," the minesweeper thus put into action part of the troops slated to occupy the Russells. On 21 February 1943, Operation Cleanslate commenced but encountered no opposition from the enemy, who had only recently evacuated the islands. As Vice Admiral George C. Dyer wrote in his biography of Admiral Richmond K. Turner The Amphibians Came to Conquer "'Cleanslate' went off with precision, but without fanfare or publicity."

For Zane, her next amphibious operation was Operation Toenails, the assault and occupation of New Georgia. Zane and Talbot (APD-7) comprised TU 31.1.1, the "Onaiavisi Occupation Unit." Each picked up a company of the Army's 169th Infantry Regiment and an LCVP in the Russells on 29 June and headed for their objective, the two small islands guarding the most direct approach to Zanana Beach on New Georgia Island. That beach was slated to be the jump-off point for the flanking attack on strategic Munda airfield.

Bad weather (low ceilings, moderate showers with corresponding poor visibility, shifting and gusty winds, and choppy seas) hampered "Toenails" from the start; but Zane and Talbot reached the Onaiavisi channel entrance at around 0225 on 30 June to begin their task. However, shortly before 0300, Zane grounded during a heavy rain squall while disembarking her troops. Nevertheless, the mishap did not hamper the landing process; for both Zane and Talbot succeeded in putting both companies of the 169th Regiment ashore without loss on Dume (later known as Sasavele Island) and Baraulu Islands to hold the Onaiavisi entrance until the shore-to-shore movement could commence to Zanana Beach.

Zane remained aground forward until 0523, when she finally managed to back free. However, the high-speed minesweeper grounded aft almost immediately, damaging her propellers. Again she tried using her own power to get free but, despite aid by Talbot, could not do so. Zane's predicament was far from good: she was a sitting duck, only five miles from Japanese-held Munda airstrip. Providentially, as Admiral Dyer recounts, "no alert Japanese artillery man hauled up a battery to take Zane under fire."

After some four hours, Rail (AT-139) pulled Zane off the rocks. The fleet tug (a former minesweeper herself) then took Zane back to the Solomons for repairs, arriving at Tulagi on 2 July.

After enough temporary patching to permit the ship to leave Guadalcanal under her own power, Zane headed via Espiritu Santo and Pearl Harbor to the Mare Island Navy Yard for permanent repairs and alterations. The high-speed minesweeper again sailed westward on 23 September, departing Mare Island, bound for Pearl Harbor. Reaching Oahu on 30 September, she remained in the Hawaiian operating area for the rest of the year 1943 and through mid-January 1944.

==== 1944 to 1945 ====
Departing Pearl Harbor on 22 January 1944, Zane subsequently took part in Operation Flintlock, the invasion of the Marshall Islands. As part of the Southern Attack Force, Zane was assigned escort duties in the Southern Transport Screen, TU 52.7.1, in company with sistership Perry, four destroyers, and two subchasers (SC's). She screened transports during the Kwajalein phase of "Flintlock" and subsequently served as "sweep" ship and mine disposal vessel during the invasion and occupation of Eniwetok. In that part of the operation, she suffered minor damage from exploding mines, some of which exploded within 100 yards of the ship.

After returning to Pearl Harbor in March for availability, Zane during the summer participated in her last major operation, Operation Forager conducted in the Mariana Islands and Palau. Again working as mine disposal vessel, Zane was part of Task Group 12.13, the Minesweeping and Hydrographic Survey Group. Unit 2, to which the ship was attached, included three of her sisterships: Chandler (DMS-9), Palmer (DMS-5), and Howard (DMS-7).

During the landing phases of "Forager", which commenced on 15 June when Vice Admiral Turner's Task Force 52 (the Northern Attack Force) began sending ashore the marines under the command of Lieutenant General H. M. Smith, USMC, Zane laid down buoys and destroyed drifting mines with gunfire, working once more as mine-destruction vessel. She spotted several planes attacking the beachheads, but all were beyond the range of her guns.

Subsequently, when marines and Army troops under Major General Roy S. Geiger went ashore on Guam on 22 July under the covering gunfire of Rear Admiral Harry W. Hill's task force, Zane worked as an antisubmarine escort vessel, steaming in the vanguard of a reserve transport group, TG 53.19. Significantly, the Guam operation proved to be the last front-line tour for the veteran high-speed minesweeper; for, after remaining in the Marianas until 8 August, she reported to Commander, Service Squadron (ServRon) 10, at Ulithi, in the Carolines, for duty as a target-towing vessel.

Zane performed target-towing and local escort duties for the remainder of the war, touching in the Palaus, Marianas, Carolines, and Philippines before V-J Day in mid-August 1945 found her at anchor in San Pedro Bay, off Leyte. During those prosaic but necessary duties, she had been reclassified from a high-speed minesweeper to a miscellaneous auxiliary, AG-109, on 5 June 1945.

The ship departed the western Pacific in October, beginning her homeward voyage from Leyte on the 13th. After touching at Eniwetok, Pearl Harbor, and San Diego en route, Zane transited the Panama Canal on 25 November and ultimately reached Norfolk, Virginia, on 29 November. She was decommissioned there on 14 December 1945.

Struck from the Navy list on 8 January 1946, the ship was delivered to Luria Brothers and Company, on 22 October 1946; her hulk was scrapped on 3 March 1947.

Zane (DMS-14) received six battle stars for her World War II service from Pearl Harbor to the Marianas. In addition, she received the Navy Unit Commendation for her services at Guadalcanal in 1942 and 1943.

=== Postscript ===
As of 2012, no other ship has been named USS Zane.

Herman Wouk, author of the novel The Caine Mutiny, served as an officer aboard Zane from February 1943 to February 1945 before becoming executive officer of another Clemson class DMS, the USS Southard in May. Zane and her campaigns served as the model for a few of the incidents that took place on the fictional USS Caine (DMS-22), although the climax of the novel is influenced by his experiences as Executive Officer on the Destroyer/Minesweeper USS Southard after she ran aground at Okinawa due to a typhoon, two months after peace was declared with Japan. Wouk began writing his first novel, Aurora Dawn, while the Zane was at Tulagi in the Solomon Islands.
