= Dwight Agnew =

United States Navy officer (1902–1969)

Dwight Merle Agnew
- Born: January 1, 1902; Fredericktown, Ohio, U.S.
- Died: October 4, 1969 (aged 67)
- Spouse: Thelma Marie Agnew (née Biegler)
- Military career
- Allegiance: United States of America
- Branch: United States Navy
- Service years: 1926–1956
- Rank: Rear Admiral
- Commands: USS Trever; Destroyer Squadron 10 (United States Atlantic Fleet)
- Battles: World War II: Defense of Pearl Harbor; Guadalcanal Campaign; Battle of Iwo Jima
- Awards: Navy Cross; Bronze Star

Dwight Merle Agnew (January 1, 1902 – October 4, 1969) was a United States Navy officer from Fredericktown, Ohio. A destroyer commander during World War II, he was present during the attack on Pearl Harbor and later received the Navy Cross for his tactical acumen during the Guadalcanal Campaign. Post-war, he led Destroyer Squadron 10 and later worked at the National Security Agency. In 1956, he was moved to the Retired List and made a "tombstone admiral".

Agnew married Thelma Marie Biegler, the daughter of United States Army officer and Medal of Honor recipient George W. Biegler.

== Early life and education ==
Dwight Agnew was born in Fredericktown, Ohio, on January 1, 1902, to Murray Agnew and Emma Louise Agnew (née Follin). After graduating from Fredericktown High School he briefly attended Denison University before entering the United States Naval Academy. He graduated from the Naval Academy in 1926 and was commissioned an ensign.

== Career ==
=== Pre-War ===
Prior to World War II, Agnew held a variety of shipboard postings, serving aboard USS Gamble, USS Omaha, and USS Nevada. During his time on Nevada, its number four gun turret crew – under his leadership – won the Trenchard Medal for excellence in gunnery.

=== World War II ===
==== Attack on Pearl Harbor ====
During the Japanese attack on Pearl Harbor on December 7, 1941, most of the Agnew family – Dwight, his brother Henry, and both of their sisters and brothers-in-law (the latter who were also Navy officers) – were stationed in Hawaii. During this time, Agnew was serving as commanding officer of USS Trever, a destroyer minesweeper.

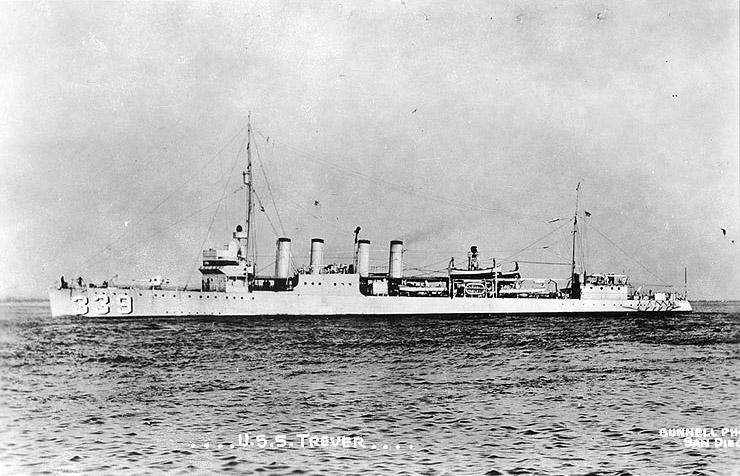
Agnew received the Navy Cross for his command of the destroyer minesweeper USS Trever (pictured) during the Guadalcanal Campaign.

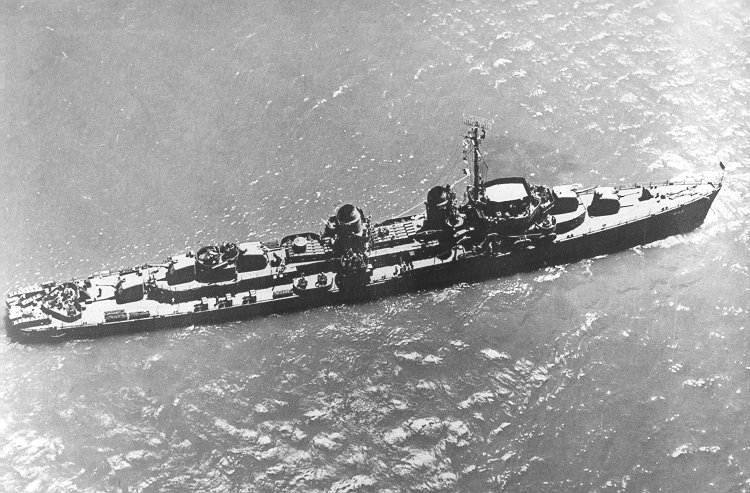
Agnew's second command was the destroyer USS Heermann (pictured).

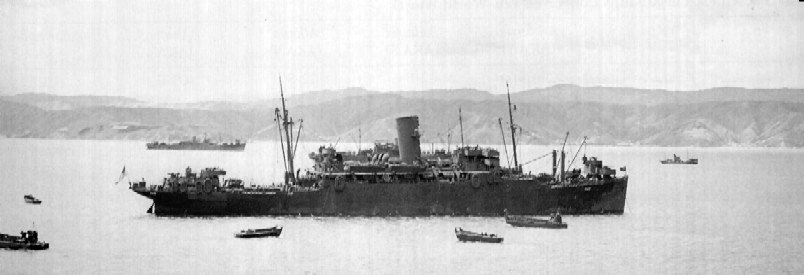
During the Battle of Iwo Jima, Agnew commanded the attack transport USS Harry Lee (pictured).

Like many American ship captains, Agnew was not aboard his vessel when the attack began at 0755 on December 7. Under command of junior officers, USS Trever sounded a General Alarm at 0757 and began returning fire against Japanese forces seven minutes later, successfully downing an Imperial Japanese Navy Air Service aircraft strafing the Pearl City Yacht Club as well as a second aircraft that was maneuvering to attack the ship. Frantic orders to sortie the fleet resulted in Agnew being left behind aboard USS Wasmuth, Trever instead putting to sea with the commander of USS Henley at her helm. Following the attack, Wasmuth rendezvoused with Trever and Agnew rejoined his ship. Trever's depth charges had already been armed and set, and Agnew ordered a magnetic sweep of the harbor before taking up a defensive station at the harbor's mouth to protect it from a feared second wave attack that did not materialize.

The following week, on December 14, Agnew led the Trever in the rescue of the crew and passengers of the torpedoed Norwegian freighter MS Høegh Merchant. The Høegh Merchant had been sunk by a Japanese submarine while attempting to navigate to a safe port following the outbreak of hostilities.

==== Pacific War ====
In August 1942 Agnew was promoted to Captain. Continuing as commanding officer of USS Trever, Agnew received the Navy Cross for his tactical brilliance in repelling an attack by the Imperial Japanese Navy upon Trever and a Task Unit he was leading during the Guadalcanal Campaign. According to his citation:

... his Unit was attacked by a force of three Japanese destroyers and during the ensuing battle he fought his ships with such brilliant success that none received serious damage and there was only small loss of personnel, while his vessels inflicted several hits on one enemy destroyer, setting it afire..."

In 1943 he was transferred to San Francisco, California, to oversee the outfitting of the new USS Heermann, subsequently commanding that ship during engagements in the Pacific for which he received the Bronze Star. Agnew was given command of the attack transport USS Harry Lee in 1945, and commanded it during the Battle of Iwo Jima.

=== Post-War ===
Following World War II, Agnew held a variety of staff assignments in the Navy – including as the naval representative to the Joint American Military Mission for Aid to Turkey – and, from January 1952 to February 1953, was commanding officer of Destroyer Squadron 10 in the United States Atlantic Fleet. During the final three years of his military career, before his 1956 retirement, he was assigned to the National Security Agency. Upon retirement he was advanced to the rank of Rear Admiral. He died on October 4, 1969.

== Personal life ==
In October 1929, Agnew married Thelma Marie Biegler, the daughter of Army officer George W. Biegler. Following the outbreak of World War II, Thelma Agnew and her son Dwight Agnew Jr, were evacuated to San Diego to stay with Dwight Agnew's mother, who was then living in the city.

Agnew's brother, Henry, was also an alumnus of the U.S. Naval Academy; he was an instructor at the academy and also held several shipboard assignments during World War II before being given command of USS Oglethorpe in the post-war period. His sisters were Dorothy and Elizabeth, both of whom married naval officers.
