= USS Buckingham =

Attack transport ship in United States Navy

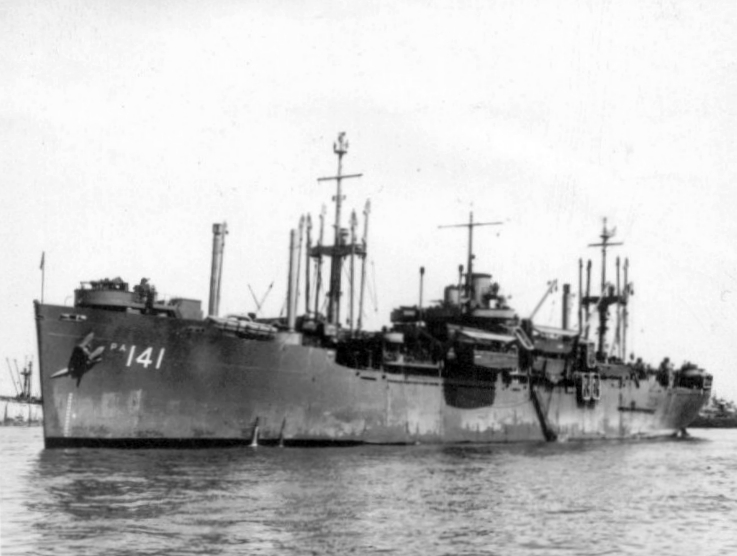

History

United States
- Name: USS Buckingham
- Namesake: Buckingham County, Virginia
- Builder: California Shipbuilding Corporation
- Laid down: 9 September 1944
- Launched: 13 November 1944
- Acquired: 23 January 1945
- Commissioned: 23 January 1945
- Decommissioned: 1 March 1946
- Stricken: 20 March 1946
- Fate: Sold for scrap, 23 January 1974

General characteristics
- Class & type: Haskell-class attack transport
- Displacement: 6,873 tons (lt), 14,837 t (fl)
- Length: 455 ft (139 m)
- Beam: 62 ft (19 m)
- Draft: 24 ft (7 m)
- Propulsion: 1 × geared turbine, 2 × header-type boilers, 1 × propeller, designed 8,500 shp (6,338 kW)
- Speed: 17 knots (31 km/h; 20 mph)
- Boats & landing craft carried: 2 × LCM; 12 × LCVP; 3 × LCPL
- Capacity: Troops: 86 officers, 1,475 enlisted; Cargo: 150,000 cu ft, 2,900 tons
- Complement: 56 officers, 480 enlisted
- Armament: 1 × 5"/38 dual-purpose gun; 4 × twin 40mm guns; 10 × single 20mm guns; late armament, add 1 × 40mm quad mount

USS Buckingham (APA-141) was a Haskell-class attack transport in service with the United States Navy from 1945 to 1946. She was scrapped in 1974.

== History ==
Buckingham (APA 141) was laid down on 9 September 1944 at Wilmington, Los Angeles, by the California Shipbuilding Corp. under a United States Maritime Commission contract (MCV hull 57); launched on 13 November 1944; sponsored by Mrs. S. J. Dickey; towed to Vancouver, Washington, for completion by the Kaiser Shipbuilding Co.; transferred to the Navy on 23 January 1945; and commissioned that same day.

=== World War II ===
The attack transport conducted shakedown training off San Pedro, Los Angeles, in February 1945 and then sailed to San Diego, California, for amphibious warfare training. She made numerous practice landings on beaches at Coronado, San Clemente, and Oceanside, California. Minor repairs of defects discovered during shakedown were corrected at Todd Shipyard in San Pedro. Buckingham then reported to the Commander, Western Sea Frontier, at San Francisco, California, for her first assignment, transportation of a cargo of ammunition and explosives to Pearl Harbor.

After loading her cargo at Port Chicago, California, the attack transport departed San Francisco Bay on 3 April and arrived at Pearl Harbor on 10 April. She waited at anchor there for nearly a week before putting to sea with a training group to practice fleet cruising, shiphandling, and amphibious landings at Maui. The ship returned to Pearl Harbor on the 28th, took on cargo, and embarked Army and Marine Corps troops for transportation to the Mariana Islands.

The attack transport sailed out of Pearl Harbor on 4 May in company with USS Clinton (APA-144), USS Pickaway (APA-222), SS Sea Sturgeon, and SS Evangeline. The convoy stopped at Eniwetok on 12 May for sailing directions, and Clinton and Buckingham, escorted by USS Southard (DMS-10), journeyed on to Guam. After discharging passengers there, the attack transport steamed eight hours northward to Saipan. Once again passengers disembarked, and new passengers, bound for Pearl Harbor, came on board. On 25 May, Buckingham sailed for Eniwetok and Hawaii, and arrived in Pearl Harbor on 4 June. Three days later the attack transport headed for San Francisco with a lighter load of passengers for repair of a split boiler. Its speed was limited to 7 knots and it was accompanied by one destroyer escort.

When Buckingham departed the United States on 28 June, she began a voyage that took her—via Pearl Harbor, Eniwetok, and Ulithi—to the Philippines and back to San Francisco, where she arrived on 17 August. News of the war's end reached the ship while she was still at sea, but she still had one more job to do. She hurriedly took on troops and cargo for passage to Pearl Harbor, continued on to Saipan and, on 22 September, steamed for Wakayama, Japan—carrying occupation forces—and landed her troops and cargo on Japanese soil on 27 September.

=== Operation Magic Carpet ===
The attack transport operated as part of the "Operation Magic Carpet" fleet on her return trip to San Francisco, carrying home over 1,800 veterans. In November, Buckingham made one more trip to Japan carrying occupation troops. She discharged some of her passengers at Sasebo on 25 November and proceeded to Nagasaki to disembark the rest. After embarking more than 1,500 returning servicemen, Buckingham crossed the Pacific Ocean for the last time.

=== Decommissioning and fate ===
Scheduled for inactivation, the ship made the long voyage to Norfolk, Virginia, early in 1946. She was decommissioned there on 1 March 1946 and was returned to the United States Maritime Commission on 5 March 1946. Her name struck from the Navy list on 20 March 1946. Placed in the Maritime Commission's National Defense Reserve Fleet at James River, Virginia, she remained there until January 1974 when she was sold to Consolidated Steel Corp., Brownsville, Texas, for scrapping.
