= USS Preble (DD-345) =

Clemson-class destroyer

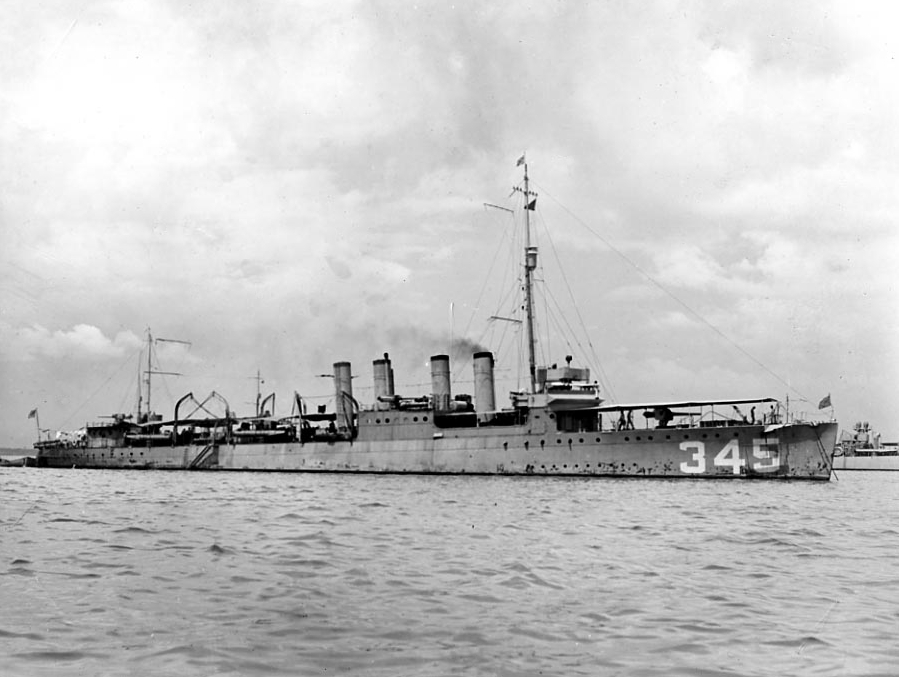
- USS Preble (DD-345) at anchor in the early 1920s.

History

United States
- Name: USS Preble (DD-345)
- Namesake: Edward Preble (1761–1807), American naval officer
- Operator: United States Navy
- Builder: Bath Iron Works, Bath, Maine
- Laid down: 12 April 1919
- Launched: 8 March 1920
- Sponsored by: Miss Sallie MacIntosh Tucker
- Commissioned: 19 March 1920
- Reclassified: Light minelayer (DM-22) 30 June 1937; Miscellaneous auxiliary (AG-99) 5 June 1945
- Decommissioned: 7 December 1945
- Stricken: 3 January 1946
- Fate: Sold 26 October 1946; Scrapped

General characteristics
- Class & type: Clemson-class destroyer
- Displacement: 1,700 tons (full)
- Length: 314 ft 4 in (95.81 m)
- Beam: 30 ft 8 in (9.35 m)
- Draft: 9 ft 3 in (2.82 m)
- Propulsion: 26,500 shp (19,761 kW) geared turbines, 2 screws
- Speed: 35 knots (65 km/h; 40 mph)
- Range: 4,900 nmi (9,100 km; 5,600 mi) at 15 knots (28 km/h; 17 mph)
- Complement: 129 officers and enlisted men
- Armament: 4 x 4 in (100 mm) guns, 1 x 3 in (76 mm) gun, 12 x 21 inch (533 mm) torpedo tubes

The fourth USS Preble (DD-345/DM-20/AG-99) was a United States Navy Clemson-class destroyer in commission from 1920 to 1945. She served in China, including on the Yangtze Patrol, and later saw combat in World War II as a minelayer. She was named for Commodore Edward Preble.

== Construction and commissioning ==
Preble was laid down by the Bath Iron Works at Bath, Maine, on 12 April 1919. She was launched on 8 March 1920, sponsored by Miss Sallie MacIntosh Tucker, and commissioned at the Boston Navy Yard in Boston, Massachusetts, on 19 March 1920, Cmdr. Harry A. Baldridge in command.

== Service history ==
=== 1920–1941 ===
After shakedown in Cuban waters, Preble was assigned special duty in Mexican waters, arriving at Vera Cruz, Mexico, on 13 June 1920. During the following weeks she made three voyages to Galveston, Texas, to obtain medical supplies including antiserum to fight bubonic plague, which had developed during the rebellion of the Sonora Triumvirate. In August 1920 she returned north to join the United States Atlantic Fleet in exercises along the United States East Coast and in the Caribbean. In January 1921 the Atlantic Fleet and the United States Pacific Fleet joined off the Panama Canal Zone and cruised to the west coast of South America. Separating on 23 February 1921, the Atlantic Fleet steamed back to the Caribbean.

Preble departed Newport, Rhode Island, on 20 June 1921 en route duty in the United States Asiatic Fleet, steaming via the Suez Canal with units of Destroyer Squadron 15. She arrived at Chefoo, China, on 26 August 1922, and for the next seven years cruised off the coast of Asia from Manchuria to Burma, in Japanese waters, and amongst the Philippine Islands, East Indies, and Mariana Islands. In September 1923 she assisted victims of the violent 1923 Great Kantō earthquake, which shook Japan on 1 September 1923. From 12 June to 2 July 1924 she was at Rangoon, Burma, and Calcutta, India, delivering aviation gasoline and lubricating oil for a flight of United States Army planes making the first aerial circumnavigation of the world. In 1927 Preble was assigned patrol duty in strife-torn China, taking aboard American and foreign refugees and escorting merchant vessels in the Yangtze and Huangpu Rivers. On several occasions Chinese factions fired on Preble from shore, but she suffered no casualties.

Preble departed Tsingtao, China, on 12 July 1929 and returned to the United States, arriving at San Diego, California, on 17 August 1929. For several years she was based at San Diego, cruising along the United States West Coast, with operations in the waters of Mexico and in the Caribbean. During her stay at San Diego, she was used for on-board location shooting of a 1931 RKO-Pathé Pictures film about World War I destroyers, Suicide Fleet, one of the three primary ships used for the filming of the movie. She was assigned to Rotating Reserve Destroyer Squadron 20 at the Mare Island Navy Yard at Mare Island in Vallejo, California, on 24 September 1932. In May 1934 Preble engaged in Fleet Problem XV off the Panama Canal and in Cuban waters, before returning to the Pacific. She participated in Fleet Problem XVI in May–June 1935 and Fleet Problem XVIII in April–May 1937, both in the Hawaiian area.

On 19 May 1937 Preble was transferred from Destroyers, Battle Force, to duty with Minecraft, Battle Force. Converted to a light minelayer, she was reclassified DM-20, effective 30 June 1937. She departed Pearl Harbor on 20 September 1937 for naval mine training operations on the U.S. West Coast and returned to Hawaii in December 1937. She remained in the Hawaiian area until the outbreak of World War II, engaging in scheduled mining exercises and fleet maneuvers.

=== World War II ===
On 7 December 1941 the United States entered World War II when the Japanese forces made their attack on Pearl Harbor, beginning the war's Pacific campaign. Preble was undergoing an overhaul at the Pearl Harbor Navy Yard when the Japanese attacked the base and was unable to get underway. As antiaircraft guns and ammunition were not aboard Preble, a large number of her crew handled ammunition, fought fires, and cared for the wounded aboard the battleship USS Pennsylvania (BB-38). On 30 January 1942, Preble completed her overhaul and joined the patrol operating just off the Pearl Harbor entrance. On 1 April 1942 she departed Pearl Harbor with units of Mine Division 1 to lay a large minefield at the French Frigate Shoals in the Northwestern Hawaiian Islands, 500 nautical miles (930 km; 580 mi) northwest of Oahu. In July 1942 she assisted in laying a defensive minefield around the base at Kodiak, Alaska, returning to Pearl Harbor via Seattle, Washington, for overhaul and patrol operations. On 6 December 1942 she departed Pearl Harbor for the Fiji Islands and Noumea on Grande Terre in New Caledonia, serving on escort duty in the New Hebrides during January 1943.

On the night of 31 January 1943, Preble and the light minelayers USS Montgomery (DM-17) and USS Tracy (DM-19) laid mines in the mouth of the Tenambo River on the coast of Guadalcanal in the Solomon Islands to prevent the evacuation of Japanese troops from Guadalcanal as the Guadalcanal campaign neared its end. During the next two months Preble performed escort duties to the New Hebrides and the Russell Islands.

On the night of 6 May 1943 Preble and the light minelayers USS Gamble (DM-15) and USS Breese (DM-18) in company with the destroyeer USS Radford (DD-446) laid mines in Ferguson Passage in the Solomon Islands between Gizo and Wanawana. On the night of 7–8 May 1943 these mines sank a Japanese destroyer and damaged two destroyers which were sunk the next day by torpedo bombers from Guadalcanal.

On 24 May 1943 Preble rescued 85 survivors from the torpedoed merchant steamer SS Stanvac Manila. On the night of 28 June 1943 Breese, Gamble, and Preble mined the waters near Shortland Island in the Shortland Islands to prevent units of the Japanese fleet based there from interfering with landing operations on Rendova Island in the New Georgia Group, which were to be carried out at dawn on 30 June `943. During July and August 1943 Preble again served as an escort vessel. On 9 September 1943 she departed Nouméa for San Francisco, California.

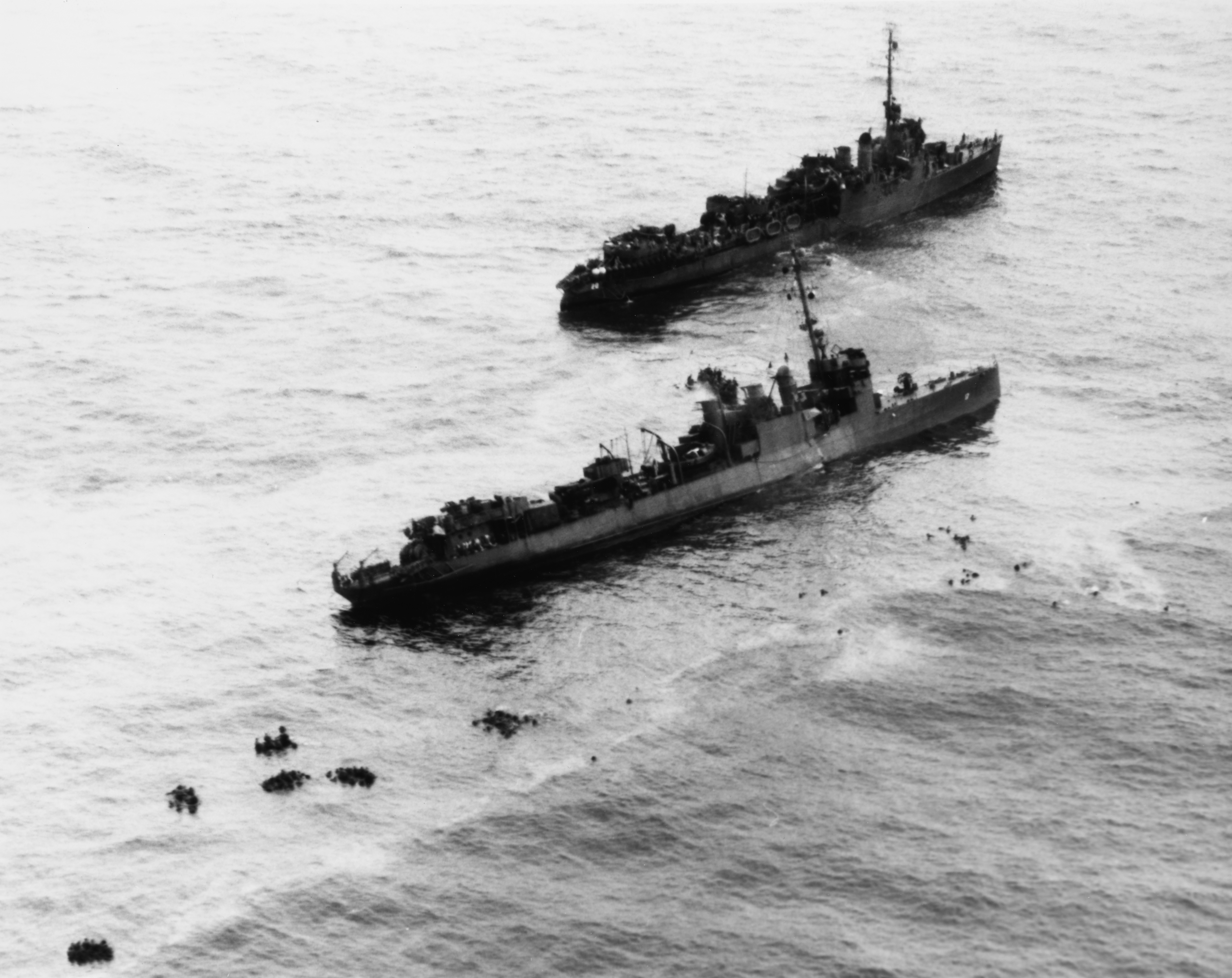
USS Preble comes alongside the sinking high-speed minesweeper USS Perry (DMS-17) on 13 September 1944.

After overhaul and duty escorting a convoy from the U.S. West Coast to Pearl Harbor, Preble reached Majuro Atoll in the Marshall Islands on 3 February 1944 where she served as antisubmarine screen and minelayer before returning to Pearl Harbor. She then made three escort voyages from Pearl Harbor to Marshall Islands ports. After minesweeping training, Preble departed Purvis Bay on Florida Island in the Solomon Islands on 6 September 1943 with minesweeping units of Rear Admiral Jesse B. Oldendorf's Task Group 32.5. Arriving off Peleliu in the Palau Islands in the early morning of 12 September 1944, while gunfire support ships began their bombardment of Peleliu, Preble separated to investigate the shoals between Angaur and Peleliu, where Allies suspected that the Japanese had planted acoustic mines. On 13 September 1944 she helped rescue survivors of the high-speed minesweeper USS Perry (DMS-17), which sank after striking a mine. As the Battle of Peleliu continued, she continued to perform various screening and minesweeping duties.

Preble arrived at Manus Island in the Admiralty Islands on 1 October 1944, where she joined minesweeping Task Group 77.5. The task group arrived off the entrance to Leyte Gulf on 17 October 1944, where Preble remained for six days, laying buoys and acting as mine destruction vessel while United States Army forces landed on Leyte in the Philippine Islands on 20 October 1944, beginning the Battle of Leyte. Preble departed Leyte Gulf on 23 October 1944 and returned to Manus. After training at Manus, she deployed to San Pedro Bay, an arm of Leyte Gulf, on 1 January 1945. A month later she departed for much-needed repairs in the United States. After a stop at Pearl Harbor, she arrived at San Francisco on 8 March 1945.

Returning to Pearl Harbor on 8 May 1945, Preble was redesignated as a "miscellaneous auxiliary" (AG-99) on 5 June 1945. She was assigned to duty escorting aircraft carriers engaged in training, acting as an antisubmarine patrol vessel and plane guard during flight operations. She reached Guam in the Mariana Islands with the escort aircraft carrier USS Vella Gulf (CVE-111) on 20 July 1945 an subsequently escorted Vella Gulf to Okinawa in the Ryukyu Islands. After returning to Guam, she escorted the escort carrier USS Sitkoh Bay (CVE-86) to Samar in the Philippine Islands, arriving there on 20 September 1945. Meanwhile, Japan had surrendered to the Allies on 2 September 1945, bringing World War II to an end.

== Decommissioning and disposal ==
Preble steamed for the United States on 9 October 1945, arriving at Norfolk, Virginia, on 20 November 1945. She decommissioned at Norfolk Naval Shipyard in Portsmouth, Virginia, on 7 December 1945. Her name was struck from the Navy List on 3 January 1946 and she was sold for scrap to Luria Brothers of Philadelphia, Pennsylvania, on 26 October 1946.

== Honors and awards ==
- Navy Expeditionary Medal
- Yangtze Service Medal
- Asiatic-Pacific Campaign Medal with eight battle stars
- World War II Victory Medal
- Navy Occupation Service Medal with "Asia" clasp

Preble received the Navy Expeditionary Medal for her operations at Shanghai from 4 to 31 August 1925.

Preble received the Yangtze Service Medal for operations on the Yangtze Patrol from 20 to 28 October 1926, from 24 February to 30 May 1927, and from 27 June to 4 August 1927.

Pruitt earned eight battle stars during World War II for her operations during the attack on Pearl Harbor (7 December 1941), the capture and defense of Guadalcanal (31 January–2 February 1943), the consolidation of the southern Solomons (6–7 and 12–13 May 1943), the New Georgia–Rendova–Vangunu occupation (29–30 June and 8–25 August 1943), the occupation of Kwajalein and Majuro Atolls (29 January–8 February 1944), the capture and occupation of the southern Palau Islands (6 September–14 October 1944), the Leyte landings (12–20 October 1944), and the Lingayen Gulf landings (4–18 January 1945).

Pruitt received the Navy Occupation Service Medal with "Asia" clasp for the period 25 to 28 September 1945.

== In media ==
Preble appeared a number of times in film and television:

- During the first hour of the 1931 film Suicide Fleet, starring William Boyd, Robert Armstrong, James Gleason, and Ginger Rogers, Preble is seen as one of several ships assisting in rescuing survivors of a sinking ship. Later shipboard scenes are shot aboard Preble, providing a good look at the ship as she looked in 1931. One scene includes a shot of Preble passing within 50 feet (15 m) of a sailing ship.
- Preble was featured in the 1937 movie Charlie Chan at the Olympics.
- Not named but clearly marked "345," her pre-1937 hull number when she was DD-345, Preble appears in the 1942 movie The Navy Comes Through starring Desi Arnez and Jackie Cooper.
- In the episode "Long Live the King" from the first season (1964–1965) of the television series Voyage to the Bottom of the Sea, the long-since-scrapped Preble is plainly visible in stock footage used in the final quarter of the episode, and the Captain Lee Crane character played by David Hedison indicates that the footage is showing the advanced units of the United States Seventh Fleet during the 1970s, the time period in which the first season is set.
