= USS Montgomery (DD-121) =

Wickes-class destroyer

Coordinates: 10°56′N 125°12′E

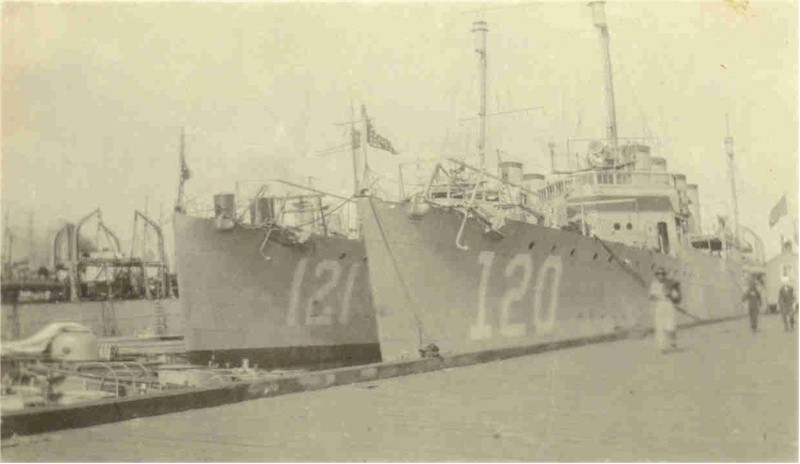
- Montgomery (left) alongside one of her sister ships, USS Radford

History

United States
- Name: Montgomery
- Namesake: John B. Montgomery
- Builder: Newport News Shipbuilding & Dry Dock Company
- Laid down: 2 October 1917
- Launched: 5 April 1918
- Commissioned: 30 September 1918
- Decommissioned: 6 June 1922
- Reclassified: Light minelayer (DM-17), 5 January 1931
- Commissioned: 20 August 1931
- Decommissioned: 7 December 1937
- Recommissioned: 25 September 1939
- Decommissioned: 23 April 1945
- Stricken: 28 April 1945
- Fate: Sold for scrap 11 March 1946

General characteristics
- Class & type: Wickes-class destroyer
- Displacement: 1,060 tons
- Length: 314 ft 5 in (95.8 m)
- Beam: 31 ft 8 in (9.7 m)
- Draft: 8 ft 8 in (2.6 m)
- Speed: 35 knots (65 km/h)
- Complement: 113 officers and enlisted
- Armament: 4 × 4 in (102 mm)/50 guns; 2 × 3 in (76 mm)/23 guns; 12 × 21 in (533 mm) torpedo tubes; 1 × depth charge protector; 2 × depth charge tracks

USS Montgomery (DD–121) was a Wickes-class destroyer in the United States Navy during World War I, later reclassified DM-17. She was the fifth ship named Montgomery and was named for Rear Admiral John B. Montgomery.

== Construction and commissioning ==
Montgomery was built by Newport News Shipbuilding & Dry Dock Company. The ship was launched on 23 March 1918, sponsored by Mrs. Andrew Jones, a descendant of Admiral Montgomery. The destroyer was commissioned on 26 July 1918.

== Service history ==
Following an east coast shakedown, Montgomery left Hampton Roads on 25 August 1918 for her first anti-submarine patrol, alternating such patrols with coastal escort duty until the close of World War I. She conducted training and fleet maneuvers from Maine to Cuba until 19 July 1919, when she departed Hampton Roads for west coast duty.

Montgomery arrived at San Diego on 7 August to join Destroyer Squadron 4, Pacific Fleet. For the next 3 1/2 years she took part in fleet operations from Alaska to Panama, then on 17 March 1922 began inactivation at San Diego, where she decommissioned on 6 June 1922.

Re-designated DM-17 on 5 January 1931, Montgomery was converted to a light minelayer and recommissioned on 20 August 1931. In December she sailed to Pearl Harbor, her base until 14 June 1937, when she returned to San Diego, there to decommission on 7 December 1937 and go into reserve.

=== World War II ===
With world tension increasing on the eve of World War II, Montgomery reactivated, recommissioning on 25 September 1939. She trained for possible war service and completed several towing assignments on the west coast until 3 December 1940 when she sailed for her new home port, Pearl Harbor.

At Pearl Harbor during the Japanese attack on 7 December 1941, Montgomery immediately began anti-submarine patrols in the approaches to the vital base, as well as inter-island convoy duty. Departing Hawaii on 11 April 1942 for Suva, Fiji, Montgomery began 16 months operating from Suva, Espiritu Santo, and Nouméa for escort and minelaying operations in the southwest Pacific, aiding in the struggle for the Solomons. One interruption to this service was 22 September to 12 November, when she sailed north to lay mines in the Aleutians in preparation for the recapture of Attu and Kiska.

While laying a minefield off Guadalcanal on the night of 24 to 25 August 1943, Montgomery collided with Preble, losing 20 feet (6 m) of her bow. She made temporary repairs at Tulagi and Espiritu Santo, then sailed on 1 October for San Francisco, arriving on 19 October.

Repairs completed, Montgomery began ten months of activity which included two convoy escort voyages between San Francisco and Hawaii (8 December 1943 to 5 February 1944), defensive minelaying around Kwajalein (17 March to 4 April), convoy escort to Majuro (May 1944), and local convoy escort in the Hawaiians. Montgomery attacked an enemy submarine contact on 25 June 1944 without evident result. After an escort voyage to Eniwetok and return (28 June to 16 July), she sailed for Guadalcanal to prepare for the invasion of the Palaus.

Getting underway for the assault on 6 September, Montgomery took station off Peleliu on 12 September to destroy mines swept from the Japanese minefields. On 17 September she screened transports landing assault troops on Angaur, and two days later sailed for mine destruction and patrol duties at Ulithi until 14 October. She bombarded Ngulu on 15 October and acted as mother ship for small minelayers during the capture of the atoll.

While anchored off Ngulu on 17 October, with her engines secured, Montgomery sighted a mine floating close aboard to port. The wind swung the ship down onto the mine before she could get underway or destroy it. The resulting explosion flooded both engine rooms and one fireroom, ruptured fuel tanks, and killed four of her crew. Salvage efforts kept her afloat until she could be towed to Ulithi for repairs. Underway on her own power on 12 January 1945, Montgomery arrived at San Francisco on 14 February. There it was recommended that she be decommissioned, which she was on 23 April 1945. Montgomery was sold for scrapping on 11 March 1946.

== Awards ==
Montgomery received four battle stars for World War II service.
