= Randolph Zane =

Purple Heart Marine Recipient

Randolph Talcott Zane
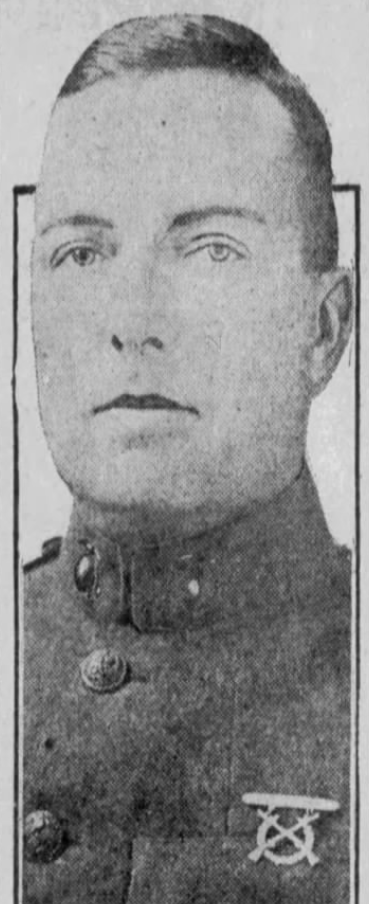
- Born: August 12, 1887; Philadelphia, Pennsylvania
- Died: October 24, 1918 (aged 31); Died of wounds from Belleau Wood
- Burial place: Somme American Military Cemetery, France.
- Military career
- Allegiance: United States of America
- Branch: United States Marine Corps
- Service years: 1909–1918
- Rank: Major
- Unit: 2nd Battalion, 6th Marines
- Conflicts: World War I: Battle of Belleau Wood
- Awards: Navy Cross; Distinguished Service Cross; Purple Heart

Randolph Talcott Zane (August 12, 1887 – October 24, 1918) was an officer in the United States Marine Corps during World War I. He was awarded the Navy Cross and the Distinguished Service Cross for his actions while holding the town of Bouresches, France against an enemy force of superior numbers on the night of June 7–8, 1918. The United States Navy's USS Zane is named in his honor.

== Military career ==
=== Early years ===
Randolph Zane was born on August 12, 1887, in Philadelphia. He was appointed a second lieutenant in the United States Marine Corps on January 6, 1909, and, a month later, reported for duty to the Headquarters, United States Marine Corps in Washington, D.C. After instruction at the Marine Officers' School, Port Royal, South Carolina, Zane joined the Marine detachment on the battleship New Hampshire at Guantánamo Bay, Cuba, on December 27, 1909.

Detached from New Hampshire in the summer of 1911, Zane next served ashore at the Naval Prison, Portsmouth, New Hampshire, until December. Reporting to the Marine Barracks, Washington, D.C., on Christmas Day 1911, Zane became post quartermaster on January 1, 1912, and held the post until February 15, 1913.

Zane then saw temporary expeditionary service in early 1913, sailing from Norfolk, Virginia, with Company "I", 2nd Regiment, 2nd Provisional Brigade of Marines, on board auxiliary cruiser Prairie and disembarked at Guantanamo Bay on February 27. Reembarked in Prairie exactly three months later, Zane returned to Washington on June 2.

After subsequent shore duty at the Marine Barracks at Puget Sound, Washington, and at Mare Island, California, and sea duty in the armored cruisers South Dakota and West Virginia, Zane joined the 4th Marine Regiment at San Diego, California, on December 29, 1914. He next served two more tours ashore — at Pearl Harbor, Hawaii, and at Quantico, Virginia, before he embarked in the transport Henderson on January 19, 1918, bound for France.

=== World War I ===
In 1918, with the United States having entered the fighting in World War I, now-Major Zane began his first tour of duty in Europe at the Bourmont, France training area, with the 6th Marine Regiment. He then went to the front lines, southeast of the famous battlefield at Verdun, where he remained from mid-March to mid-May. In command of the 79th Company, 2nd Battalion, 6th Marines, he moved with his unit to Vitry-le-François and then to Gisors-Chaumont-en-Vexin, where Zane and his companions received urgent orders sending them to the Château-Thierry sector.

Major Zane participated in the fighting in the vicinity of Belleau Wood, when the untried Marines came up against the 461st Imperial German Infantry, a unit that Colonel Robert D. Heinl called "the largest single body of combat-seasoned regular troops which Marines had confronted since Bladensburg" (1814). Zane took part in the second phase of the assault, when the 2nd Battalion 6th Marines and 3rd Battalion 6th Marines entered the wood, and remained in action through the entire period of fighting.

Zane was wounded and shell shocked on June 26, 1918. He never recovered from his injuries and died on October 24, 1918. He is buried at the Somme American Military Cemetery, Bony, France.

==== Distinguished Service Cross citation ====
The President of the United States of America, authorized by Act of Congress, July 9, 1918, takes pleasure in presenting the Distinguished Service Cross to Captain Randolph Talcott Zane (MCSN: 0-3689), United States Marine Corps, for extraordinary heroism while serving with the Seventy-Ninth Company, Sixth Regiment (Marines), 2d Division, A.E.F., in action while holding the town of Bouresches, France, on the night of June 7–8, 1918. Captain Zane displayed such bravery as to inspire the garrison to resist successfully a heavy machine-gun and infantry attack by superior numbers.

==== Navy Cross citation ====
The President of the United States of America takes pride in presenting the Navy Cross (Posthumously) to Captain Randolph Talcott Zane (MCSN: 0-3689), United States Marine Corps, for extraordinary heroism while serving with the 79th Company, 6th Regiment (Marines), 2d Division, A.E.F. in action while holding the town of Bouresches, France, on the night of June 7–8, 1918. Captain Zane displayed such bravery as to inspire the garrison to resist successfully a heavy machine-gun and infantry attack by superior numbers.

==== Silver Star citation ====
By direction of the President, under the provisions of the act of Congress approved July 9, 1918 (Bul. No. 43, W.D., 1918), Captain Randolph Talcott Zane (MCSN: 0-3689), United States Marine Corps, is cited (Posthumously) by the Commanding General, American Expeditionary Forces, for gallantry in action and a silver star may be placed upon the ribbon of the Victory Medals awarded him. Captain Zane distinguished himself while serving with 79th Company, 6th Regiment (Marines), 2d Division, American Expeditionary Forces at Chateau-Thierry, France, 6 June to 10 July 1918.

== Personal life ==
His widow, Barbara Stephens Zane (daughter of California governor William D. Stephens). His daughter, Marjorie Zane christened the USS Zane.

== Namesake ==
The United States Navy's USS Zane, a Clemson-class destroyer, was named in his honor.

== See also ==
- Dan Daly, also recipient of Navy Cross for same battle
