= George W. Biegler =

- Born: May 31, 1868; Terre Haute, Indiana, US
- Died: April 2, 1929 (aged 59); San Francisco, California, US
- Burial place: Hollywood, California
- Military career
- Allegiance: United States
- Branch: Indiana National Guard; United States Army
- Service years: 1889–1898 (National Guard); 1898–1929 (Army)
- Rank: Lieutenant colonel
- Commands: B Company, 159th Indiana Volunteers; Company G, 28th Volunteer Infantry
- Conflicts: Spanish–American War; Philippine–American War; Pancho Villa Expedition; World War I
- Awards: Medal of Honor

George Wesley Biegler (May 31, 1868 – April 2, 1929) was a United States Army Captain who received the Medal of Honor for actions during the Philippine–American War on October 21, 1900.

== Biography ==
George Biegler was born May 31, 1868, in Terre Haute, Indiana. He joined the Indiana National Guard in 1889, and was mustered into service with the 159th Indiana Volunteer Infantry in April 1898. He mustered out the following November, and joined the 28th US Volunteer Infantry in July 1899.

He was serving as a captain with the 28th US Volunteer Infantry near Loac, Luzon, Philippines on October 21, 1900, the date of his Medal of Honor action. His citation was issued on March 11, 1902. However, some accounts indicate that the award was not presented to Biegler until October 17, 1927, by then-Secretary of War Dwight F. Davis.

Biegler was commissioned in the regular army in February 1901, and later served on the Mexican border in the search for Pancho Villa and in World War I. He later reached the rank of lieutenant colonel and served in the army until his death.

Biegler died at Letterman Hospital in San Francisco, California, and was buried in Hollywood, California. His funeral service was held on April 7, 1929, at the post Chapel at the Presidio of San Francisco. His grave can be found in Section 6, Lot 170.

Following his death, Biegler's daughter – Thelma Marie – married Dwight Agnew.

== Medal of Honor citation ==
Rank and Organization: Captain, 28th Infantry, U.S. Volunteers. Place and Date: Near Loac, Luzon, Philippine Islands, October 21, 1900. Entered Service At: Terre Haute, Ind. Birth: Terre Haute, Ind. Date of Issue: March 11, 1902.

Citation:

With but 19 men resisted and at close quarters defeated 300 of the enemy.

== See also ==
- List of Medal of Honor recipients
- List of Philippine–American War Medal of Honor recipients
