= USS Wasmuth =

Clemson-class destroyer

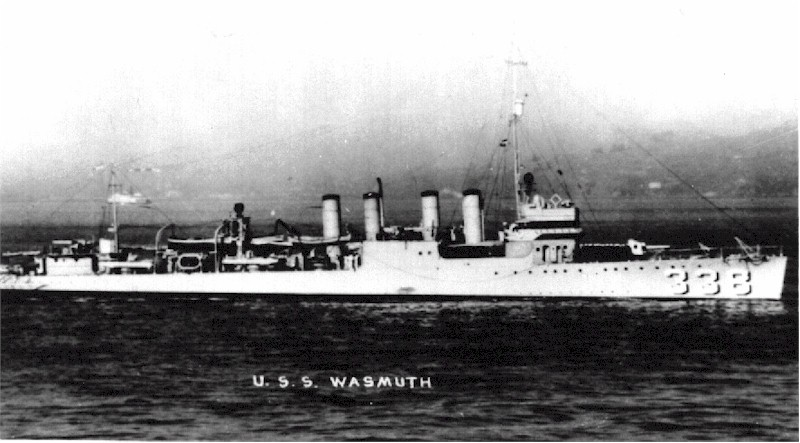

History

United States
- Name: Wasmuth
- Namesake: Henry Wasmuth
- Builder: Mare Island Naval Shipyard
- Laid down: 12 August 1919
- Launched: 15 September 1920
- Commissioned: 16 December 1921
- Stricken: 3 September 1943
- Fate: Sank during a storm, 29 December 1942

General characteristics
- Class & type: Clemson-class destroyer
- Displacement: 1,215 tons
- Length: 314 ft 4 1/2 in (95.822 m)
- Beam: 30 ft 11 1/2 in (9.436 m)
- Draft: 9 ft 4 in (2.84 m)
- Propulsion: 26,500 shp (19,800 kW); Geared turbines; 2 screws
- Speed: 35 knots (65 km/h; 40 mph)
- Range: 4,900 nmi (9,100 km; 5,600 mi) at 15 knots (28 km/h; 17 mph)
- Complement: 122 officers and enlisted
- Armament: 4 × 4 in (102 mm)/50 guns; 1 × 3 in (76 mm)/25 gun; 12 × 21 in (533 mm) torpedo tubes

USS Wasmuth (DD-338/DMS-15) was a Clemson-class destroyer in the United States Navy following World War I.

== Namesake ==
Henry Wasmuth was born c. 1840 in Germany. He enlisted in the United States Marine Corps on 11 June 1861. Ultimately attached to the Marine detachment of the sidewheeler Powhatan, Wasmuth took part in the assault on Fort Fisher, North Carolina, on 15 January 1865. During the battle, Ensign Robley Dunglison Evans fell wounded from a Confederate sharpshooter's bullet. Private Wasmuth picked up the seriously wounded young officer and carried him to a place of comparative safety-—a shell hole on the beach. Wasmuth stayed with Evans, ignoring the latter's urgings to take cover, until a sharpshooter's bullet pierced Wasmuth's neck, cutting the jugular vein. Within a few minutes, Wasmuth dropped in the edge of the surf and died. Evans later wrote: "He was an honor to his uniform."

== History ==
Wasmuth was laid down on 12 August 1919 at the Mare Island Navy Yard, Vallejo, California and designated DD-338 on 17 July 1920. The destroyer was launched on 15 September 1920, sponsored by Miss Gertrude E. Bennet, stepdaughter of Lieutenant Colonel R. H. Davis, USMC, an officer on duty at Mare Island. Wasmuth was commissioned on 16 December 1921. Wasmuth was fitted out at Mare Island until 27 February 1922, when she sailed for Richmond, California, to commence her shakedown cruise. Operating off Sausalito and Mare Island, the new destroyer completed her trials on 14 March, putting into her builder's yard on that day for post-shakedown repairs. She sailed for San Francisco, California on 1 May and calibrated her sound signal apparatus at that port until the 4th, when she shifted to San Pedro. Wasmuth then spent the next month operating in connection with battleship torpedo practices, a duty broken on 7 May by dispatch service to San Diego. Returning to that port from San Pedro on 8 June, she commenced preparations for decommissioning soon thereafter.

Placed out of commission at San Diego on 26 July 1922, Wasmuth remained in reserve for nearly eight years during the 1920s, when treaty restrictions and cuts in operating funds reduced the Navy's active seagoing forces. Recommissioned on 11 March 1930, Lt. Cmdr. Ingram C. Sowell in command, Wasmuth operated as a destroyer for the next decade, participating in an intensive slate of tactical exercises and maneuvers, varying that routine with upkeep and training. She also operated with the Battle Force's Destroyer Flotilla 2 from the western seaboard into the Caribbean. Only for one brief period, in the autumn of 1934, was Wasmuth not fully active, being then assigned to Rotating Reserve Squadron 10.

With the construction of newer, more heavily armed and far-ranging destroyers, the need for the old "flush-deckers" in their designed destroyer role diminished. While, of course, a great many of those World War I-authorized ships lay in reserve on both coasts, the Navy was expanding as the 1930s had progressed and, in view of ominous developments in Europe and the Far East, was broadening its operational horizons. Aviation-oriented and mine-warfare types of ships - seaplane tenders and fast minesweepers and minelayers - were needed. Accordingly, some of the old "flush-deckers" were converted to other roles. Wasmuth, a unit of the fleet in Hawaiian waters since the permanent basing of the ships there in April 1940, was among the Clemson-class ships chosen for conversion to high-speed minesweepers of the Chandler class. Wasmuth, reclassified as DMS-15 on 19 November 1940, underwent the metamorphosis at the Pearl Harbor Navy Yard. Retaining her full four-gun main battery and an antiaircraft battery of .50-caliber machine guns, as well as depth charge tracks, the ship lost her torpedo capability when minesweeping gear replaced her dozen 21-inch (533 mm) torpedo tubes.

Upon completion of that conversion at the Pearl Harbor Navy Yard on 5 April 1941, Wasmuth sailed for Palmyra Island and operated there until 19 April, when she set course to return to Pearl Harbor. The high-speed minesweeper subsequently remained in Hawaiian waters until 10 June, when she sailed for the west coast of the United States. Returning to Hawaii in early July, Wasmuth operated out of Pearl Harbor through the autumn of 1941, as tensions increased in the Far East. She operated on local patrol and minesweeping exercises during that time, as the fleet maintained an intensive training schedule.

=== World War II ===
Shortly before 0800 on 7 December 1941, planes from six Japanese aircraft carriers swept down upon the fleet units present at Pearl Harbor, in a surprise attack. Wasmuth (among the ships in port that Sunday) lay at buoys D-7 and D-7S inboard in a nest with three sister ships of Mine Division (MineDiv) 4: Trever, Zane, and Perry, at the mouth of Pearl Harbor's Middle Loch and just off Pearl City.

Wasmuth went to general quarters at once and Lt. (jg.) J. R. Grey (in the absence of both the commander and executive officer) assumed command of the ship. Within three minutes, her gunners had all of the .50-caliber Browning machine guns ready for action while the ship prepared to get underway. Inside the nest, however, the high-speed minesweeper could only bring her aftermost machine guns to bear against the approaching planes.

Shortly after 0900, about midway through horizontal bomber attacks (carried out by Nakajima B5N bombers), Aichi D3A's (later code-named "Vals") began glide- and dive-bombing attacks on the ships and shore installations, kicking off the fourth phase of the raid. Those planes, coming from a westerly direction, were targets for the eager gunners in the minesweepers and minelayers moored in Middle Loch. Wasmuth's gunners (who expended 6,000 rounds of .50-caliber ammunition in the action) opened fire whenever the planes came within range. One man, Seaman 1st Class James P. Hannon, was given credit for shooting down an Aichi that crashed in a portion of Pearl Harbor on Waipio Peninsula, near Middle Loch just North of Mamala Bay in South Central Oahu. The ship damaged several other planes as they came by.

Lt Cmdr. L. M. LeHardy (Zane's commanding officer and the senior officer present of MineDiv 4) ordered the ships to get underway, Trever leading the pack at 0932. Five minutes later, Lt. J. W. Leverton, Wasmuth's executive officer, arrived as his ship edged out of Middle Loch, and took command, relieving Lt. (jg.) Grey who had fought the ship since the outset of the attack. Shortly thereafter, Trever's commander reported on board too, since his own ship was steaming down the channel without him. Proceeding out of her harbor herself soon thereafter, Wasmuth took up patrols off the channel entrance. Meanwhile, while the attack itself had ceased, jittery sailors, marines, and soldiers were not so sure. At sea, the forces searching for the retiring Japanese suspected the presence of enemy submarines, real or otherwise. At 1023, Wasmuth dropped one depth charge "on suspicious water" but came up with only a negative result. At 1036, the high-speed minesweeper dropped another depth charge, but only achieved the same result as the first attack - nothing. Although it brought up "large quantities of oil" there was no wreckage. Later that afternoon, Wasmuth and Zane swept the Pearl Harbor entrance channel before the former anchored at the coal docks when her sweep wire parted. After she retrieved the sweep gear, she headed back to the open sea, where her commanding officer, Lt. Cmdr. J. L. Wilfong, reported aboard. Trever's commanding officer, Lt. Comdr. D. M. Agnew, rejoined his own ship at 1635. MineDiv 4 soon resumed its patrol operations.

Wasmuth operated in the Hawaiian chain between Johnston Island and Pearl Harbor into the spring of 1942. She departed Pearl Harbor on 31 May 1942, and escorted Convoy 4111 to San Francisco, reaching her destination on 10 June. Departing there on the last day of July, Wasmuth returned to Pearl Harbor with Convoy 2113, arriving on 12 August.

Departing Pearl Harbor on 14 August, Wasmuth left Hawaii in her wake for the last time, bound for the Aleutian Islands. Reaching Kodiak, Alaska, on 20 August, the high-speed minesweeper spent the remainder of her career in this region as part of Task Force 8, performing screen and escort duties for the supply ships necessary to bear the "beans, bullets, and black oil" to that theater. In the course of her operations that autumn and winter, the ship visited such picturesquely named places as Women's Bay, Dutch Harbor, Nome, and Kodiak.

=== Fate ===
Two days after Christmas of 1942, Wasmuth was escorting a convoy through a heavy Alaskan storm when two depth charges were wrenched from their tracks by the pounding sea, fell over the side, and exploded beneath the ship's fantail. The blasts carried away part of the ship's stern and the ship began to founder; in the gale, the pumps could not make headway against the inexorably rising water below. Despite the heavy sea, Ramapo came alongside the foundering Wasmuth. For three and a half hours, the tanker remained with the sinking high-speed minesweeper, battling the waves while successfully transferring her crew and two passengers. After completing that rescue, Ramapo pulled away; Wasmuth eventually sank early on 29 December 1942. Her name was struck from the Navy list on 3 September 1943.

== Honors and awards ==
Wasmuth (DMS-15) received one battle star for her part in the defense of the fleet at Pearl Harbor on 7 December 1941.
