= Fredericktown High School =

Fredeericktown High School

Location
- 111 Stadium Drive; Fredericktown, Ohio 43019
- Coordinates: 40°28′33″N 82°33′11″W

Information
- Type: Public, coeducational
- School district: Fredericktown Local School District
- Principal: Ryan Shoemaker
- Teaching staff: 17.00 (FTE)
- Grades: 9–12
- Student to teacher ratio: 19.47
- Colors: Scarlet and gray
- Athletics conference: Knox Morrow Athletic Conference
- Sports: Football
- Mascot: Freddie Bird
- Team name: Freddies
- Rival: Centerburg Trojans
- Accreditation: Ohio Department of Education
- Website: hs.fredericktownschools.com

Fredericktown High School is a public high school in Fredericktown, Ohio. It is the only high school in the Fredericktown Local School District. The school's athletic teams are known as 'The Freddies', with school colors of red and gray.

== Notable alumni ==
- Dwight Agnew, U.S. Navy officer
- Luke Perry, actor, best known for his roles on 8 Seconds portraying Lane Frost, Beverly Hills, 90210 and Riverdale
- Ollie Cline, professional football player in the National Football League (NFL)
- Thomas Caputo, 2020 OHSAA state cross country champion in the Division III boys race.
