= USS Clinton (APA-144) =

1944 Haskell-class attack transport

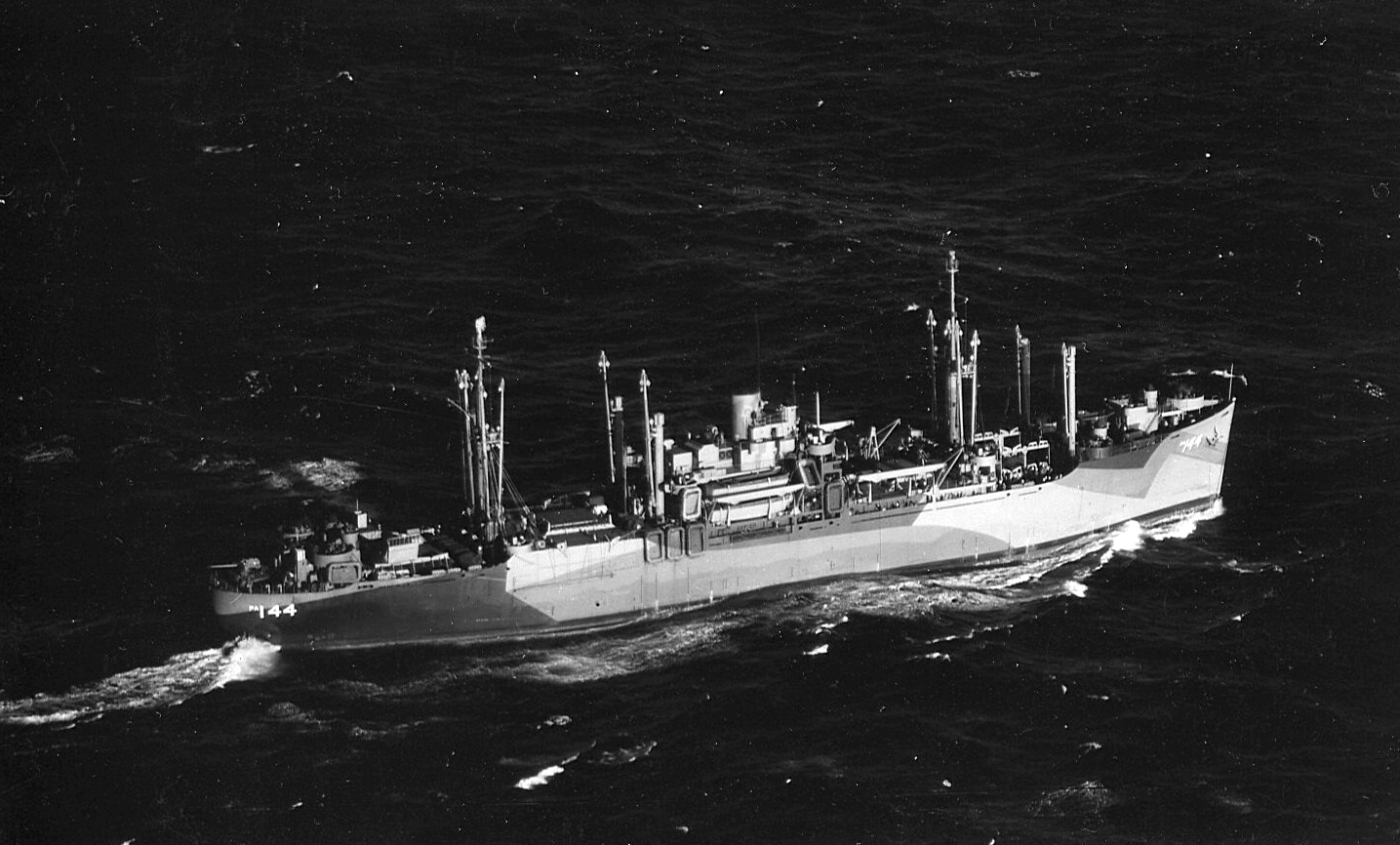

History

United States
- Name: USS Clinton
- Namesake: Clinton County, Illinois; Clinton County, Indiana; Clinton County, Iowa; Clinton County, Kentucky; Clinton County, Michigan; Clinton County, Missouri; Clinton County, New York; Clinton County, Ohio; Clinton County, Pennsylvania
- Builder: California Shipbuilding Corporation
- Laid down: 27 September 1944
- Launched: 29 November 1944
- Acquired: 1 February 1945
- Commissioned: 1 February 1945
- Decommissioned: 2 May 1946
- Stricken: 1 October 1958
- Fate: Sunk as a target, 1 August 1984

General characteristics
- Class & type: Haskell-class attack transport
- Displacement: 6,873 tons (lt), 14,837 t (fl)
- Length: 455 ft (139 m)
- Beam: 62 ft (19 m)
- Draft: 24 ft (7 m)
- Propulsion: 1 × geared turbine, 2 × header-type boilers, 1 × propeller, designed 8,500 shp (6,338 kW)
- Speed: 17 knots (31 km/h; 20 mph)
- Boats & landing craft carried: 2 × LCM; 12 × LCVP; 3 × LCPL
- Capacity: Troops: 86 officers, 1,475 enlisted; Cargo: 150,000 cu ft, 2,900 tons
- Complement: 56 officers, 480 enlisted
- Armament: 1 × 5"/38 dual-purpose gun; 4 × twin 40mm guns; 10 × single 20mm guns; late armament, add 1 × 40mm quad mount

USS Clinton (APA/LPA-144) was a Haskell-class attack transport in service with the United States Navy from 1945 to 1946. She was sunk as a target in 1984.

== History ==
Clinton was launched 29 November 1944 by California Shipbuilding Co., Wilmington, California, under a Maritime Commission contract; sponsored by Mrs. L. N. Green; transferred to the Navy 1 February 1945; converted at U.S. Naval Station, Astoria, Oregon; and commissioned 1 February 1945.

Clinton cleared San Francisco, California, 17 April 1945 and sailed to land Marine replacement troops and equipment on Okinawa between 27 and 31 May. She transferred battle casualties to Guam where she embarked ground forces of the 7th Bomber Command for transportation to Okinawa, arriving 2 July. When she sailed 6 days later she was carrying over 1,000 Okinawan and Korean prisoners of war for internment in the Hawaiian Islands. Clinton cleared Honolulu 5 August carrying replacement troops to Saipan.

She sailed on to Manila to embark Army occupation troops whom she landed at Qingdao, China, 11 October 1945. Arriving at Haiphong, French Indo-China, 26 October, she loaded Chinese troops and equipment and carried them to Chinwangtao and Taku for the reoccupation of northern China. Based on an anecdotal description of one of its crew members, the ship may have also been assigned to transport troops to Yokohama to assist in the post-war occupation there. Assigned to "Operation Magic Carpet" duty, Clinton embarked homeward-bound servicemen at Manila and sailed 28 November for San Francisco, California, arriving 18 December. She continued to the U.S. East Coast, arriving at Norfolk, Virginia, 2 February 1946.

=== Decommissioning and fate ===
Clinton was decommissioned 2 May 1946 and transferred to the Maritime Commission for disposal 1 October 1958. She was redesignated as an Amphibious Transport (LPA-144) on 1 January 1969. Withdrawn from the National Defense Reserve Fleet, 9 November 1983, the ex-Clinton was sunk as a fleet exercise target off the Virginia Capes, 1 August 1984.

== Awards ==
Clinton received one battle star for World War II service.
