= USS Henry T. Allen =

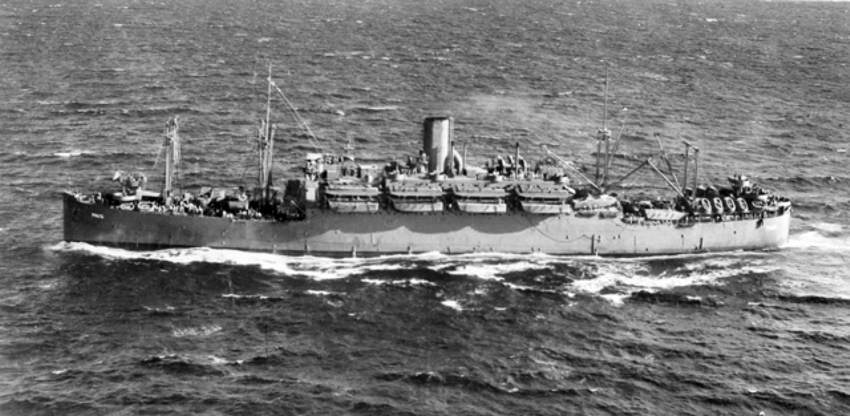
- Henry T. Allen on 11 February 1944

History

United States
- Name: Wenatchee; President Jefferson; Henry T. Allen
- Namesake: Probably Henry Tureman Allen, commander of the US 90th Infantry Division
- Builder: New York Shipbuilding
- Laid down: 15 June 1918
- Launched: 24 May 1919
- Christened: Wenatchee
- Completed: February 1921
- Acquired: (by the Navy) 6 December 1941
- Commissioned: (As AP-30) 22 April 1942
- Decommissioned: 5 February 1946
- Renamed: Henry T. Allen (1940)
- Reclassified: AP-30 to APA-15, 1 February 1943; to AG-90 January 1945
- Honours and awards: Four battle stars for World War II service
- Fate: Sold for scrap, March 1948

General characteristics
- Class & type: EFC Design 1029 ship; (Navy) Harris-class attack transport
- Displacement: 13,529 tons (lt), 21,900 t.(fl)
- Length: 535 ft 2 in
- Beam: 72 ft 4 in
- Draft: 31 ft 3 in
- Propulsion: 2 x Westinghouse geared turbine drive, 8 x Babcock & Wilcox header-type boilers, 2 propellers, designed shaft horsepower 12,000.
- Speed: 16 knots
- Capacity: Troops: 107 Officers, 1,417 Enlisted; Cargo: 409,400 cu ft, tonnage unknown
- Complement: Officers 52, Enlisted 673
- Armament: 4 x 3"/50 caliber dual-purpose gun mounts, 2 x twin 40mm gun mounts, 2 x quad 1.1"/75 caliber gun mounts, 15 x single 20mm gun mounts.

USS Henry T. Allen was a Harris class attack transport in service with the United States Army from 1940 to 1941. She was then transferred to the United States Navy where she served until 1946. She was scrapped in 1948. The ship was originally built as an Emergency Fleet Corporation Design 1029 ship in 1919 and operated in commercial service as Wenatchee and President Jefferson until being laid up in 1938.

== Construction ==
Wenatchee, hull 240 laid down at New York Shipbuilding Corporation, Camden, New Jersey 15 June 1918, was one of three hulls intended to become Army transports already under construction at the yard, the others being hull 241 Sea Girt and hull 242 Koda when the armistice ended World War I and the design was modified to a civilian passenger and cargo configuration, the Emergency Fleet Corporation Design 1029 ships that were known in commerce as the "535's" for their overall length. Of those one had been launched and a second was ready for launch when the USSB changed plans from troop transports to completion as passenger ships. At some point Wenatchee may have been assigned the name Beaver State by USSB in conformance with the majority of the ships of the design but the three ships begun as Army transports when the design changed to passenger-cargo ships remained the only ones not formally assigned the state nicknames. (Note: The Pacific Marine Review shows Beaver State being renamed President Jefferson in a group that includes the other two ships, American Legion and Southern Cross (ex Sea Girt) started when the design changed. McKellar shows the ship with C. M. Schwab as the contract name. References prior to the mass renaming of the "State" ships to "President" names sometimes associate the name Beaver State with the ship launched as Wenatchee. The "State" names were assigned to new construction of this type intended from the start as commercial ships and Beaver State may have been briefly assigned. Contemporary sources make it clear the ship was launched as Wenatchee and remaining so into 1922 when the "President" names became effective. A close look at the period shows proposed names existing only on paper in a number of cases.)

Wenatchee was launched 24 May 1919 and completed during February 1921, the first of the group to be finished. (Note: The Nautical Gazette, 12 February 1921 shows the ship "undergoing finishing touches" and due to sail for Seattle in late February. The origin of the June completion date in some references is not known.) The ship departed New York 12 March 1921 for Seattle, Washington to be the third USSB "535" for the Pacific and first transpacific liner to be based in Seattle in six years.

== Commercial service ==
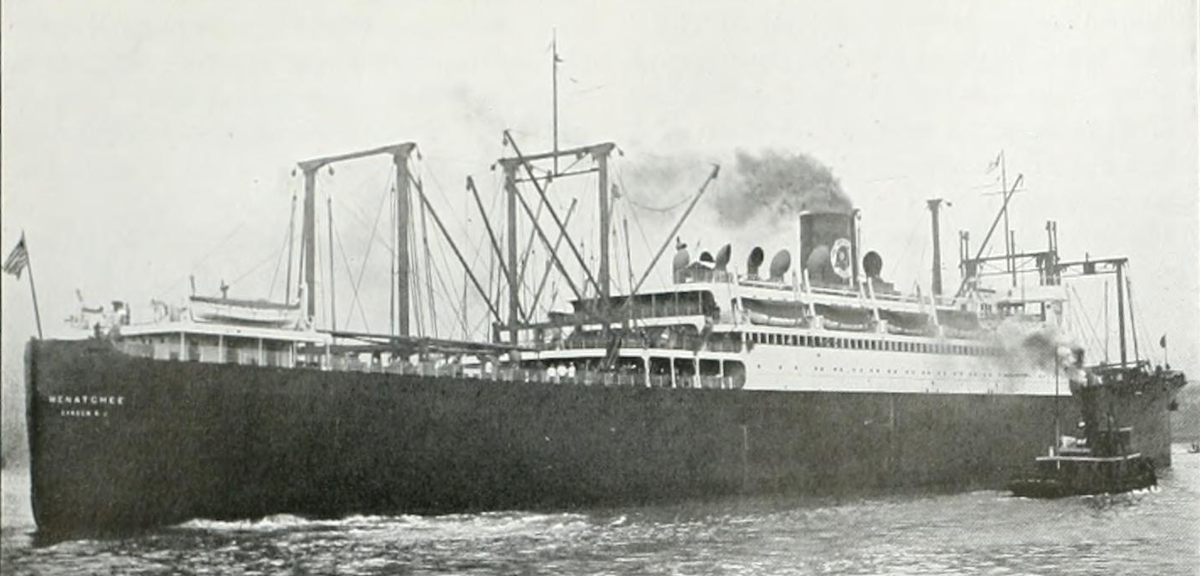
Wenatchee, operated by the Pacific Steamship Company, arrives in Seattle harbor.

The USSB allocated the ship to the Pacific Steamship Company which placed her in its Admiral Line for operation on its service to Yokohama, Japan, Shanghai and Hong Kong, China and Manila. With the sailing of Wenatchee on 9 April 1921 the line inaugurated that service. She was followed by sister "535's" Silver State on 9 July and Keystone State on 30 July. Wenatchee was briefly removed from service for repairs and improvements at Todd Shipyard in Seattle during which she was replaced for one voyage by Matson's Hawkeye State. With eventual allocation of five "535's" the company was able to match Nippon Yusen Kaisha transpacific service with United States flag vessels sailing on fourteen day schedules for

By May 1922 all the "State" ships of the Design 1095 and Design 1029 were renamed for United States presidents with Wenatchee (possibly briefly Beaver State on some list between sailing for Seattle in March) being renamed President Jefferson.

In December 1922 the USSB announced that its ships operated by Pacific Steamship Company's Admiral Line would be operated by a new line under Robert Stanley Dollar, son of Robert Dollar, to be known as the Admiral Oriental Line. The Pacific Steamship Company operated its own, company owned ships in a coastwise trade and the USSB determined the transpacific operation of its ships required full attention. Dollar, a large stockholder in Pacific Steamship and an experienced operator of transpacific steamships, took up residence in Seattle to form the new operating company. President Jefferson, along with sisters now named President Grant, President Jackson (ex Silver State), President Madison and President McKinley (ex Keystone State) effective 14 October 1922 began operation as Admiral Oriental Line vessels. By April 1926 the USSB had sold the "535" ships for $4,500,000 to the Dollar Steamship Company.

President Jefferson was returned to the U.S. Maritime Commission in 1938 to be laid up in the reserve fleet at Seattle.

== U.S. Army service ==
President Jefferson was acquired by the U.S. Army Transport Service (A.T.S.) 1 November 1940 and renamed USAT Henry T. Allen for service with the A.T.S. Pacific Fleet home ported at Fort Mason, California under Captain James McPherson (Note: Army transports were under the command of civilian merchant mariners employed by the Army.) from 11 November 1940 until 6 December 1941.

== U.S. Navy service ==
The ship was then acquired by the Navy 6 December 1941 and placed in partial commission for conversion to Navy use at Moore Dry Dock of Oakland, California. The ship was at the Mare Island Navy Yard on 7 December 1941. Henry T. Allen commissioned in full 22 April 1942, Captain P. A. Stevens commanding.

== World War II service ==
After completion of outfitting, Henry T. Allen made one troop carrying voyage to Honolulu and return. Arriving San Diego 18 June 1942, she took part in amphibious landing exercises until August, helping to mold the potent American assault forces which would be a decisive factor in the Pacific war. The ship sailed 22 August via the Canal Zone for Norfolk, Virginia, where she arrived 11 September for more landing training on the Maryland coast.

=== Invasion of North Africa ===
Henry T. Allen departed 23 October for North Africa and Operation Torch as part of the Northern Attack Force under Brig. Gen. Lucian K. Truscott Jr. and serving as flagship in that phase of the operation with headquarters remaining aboard during the landing of troops until it could be set up ashore. The force arrived off Mehedia, near strategic Port Lyautey, 7 November and Henry T. Allen began that morning to unload her Army troops from the transport area. She remained off the beaches occasionally subjected to fire from shore batteries until 15 November. She then helped consolidate the successful landing by mooring at Casablanca to unload cargo. The transport sailed 17 November and arrived Norfolk the 30th.

=== Pacific Theater ===
Following the important North Africa landings, during which much was learned about amphibious operations, Henry T. Allen was assigned to the Pacific, a theater in which amphibious assaults were to play a central role. Carrying Marines, she sailed 17 December and arrived Tutuila, Samoa group, via the Canal Zone, 13 January 1943. The ship also transported troops to Noumea and Espiritu Santo and while at the latter port 1 February 1943 was redesignated an attack transport, APA-15.

On 17 March 1943 Allen was assigned as flagship, Commander Amphibious Force, Seventh Fleet, but was in poor condition and urgently needed for training and transport. She was assigned to critical amphibious training for troops of Amphibious Force, Southwest Pacific reporting at Sydney. The ships condition was such that on 10 April 1943 she had to be withdrawn from training for five weeks overhaul availability at Sydney.

Until March 1944 Henry T. Allen operated between New Guinea and Australian ports, carrying both American and Australian troops in support of the Allied offensive in New Guinea and the Solomons. She made many passages through the dangerous waters of the Coral Sea, and on one occasion, 13 July 1943 detected a torpedo track approaching her port bow. Alert action brought the transport around and out of danger, the torpedo passing a scant 50 yards ahead.

==== Invasion of New Guinea ====
Henry T. Allen sailed from Buna 26 March for training exercises on Goodenough Island with the U.S. 24th Infantry Division, completing 16 April. The ship then got underway 17 April for the important Hollandia operation, the joint attack on Central New Guinea. Henry T. Allen joined Admiral Barbey's group for the landings at Tanahmerah Bay 22 April and after their success was assured steamed to Cape Sudest, New Guinea, 24 April.

The ship spent the next few weeks transporting troops into Hollandia to consolidate gains and prepare for the next step in the westward advance toward the Philippines. Henry T. Allen anchored at Aitape 15 May to load troops for the Wakde-Sarmi landings, and got underway the next day for a run of 120 miles undetected by the Japanese. Under a brisk naval bombardment the transport unloaded on the 17th and returned to Hollandia.

==== Flagship ====
The veteran transport spent the rest of her career as a flagship for various amphibious commands. Until September 1944 she performed training exercises on Bougainville and New Guinea, and after a voyage to Queensland, Australia, arrived Hollandia 3 October 1944. There she received additional equipment and supplies to allow her to better perform her headquarters function. With Leyte approaching and USS Blue Ridge destined to be the flagship for that operation on 7 October 1944 Captain H. J. Nelson, USN, Commander Administrative Command, Seventh Amphibious Force, established the Administrative Group of the Staff of Commander Seventh Amphibious Force aboard Allen. Henry T. Allen remained at Hollandia until January 1945 as the administrative base of the famous 7th Amphibious Force. She shifted her base to Leyte Gulf as American forces swept north and west, arriving 28 January 1945. She was reclassified AG-90 in January 1945.

=== Decommissioning ===
After the final surrender of Japan Henry T. Allen steamed to Manila 3 September and departed for the United States 15 November. She arrived 10 December 1945, decommissioned 5 February 1946 and was redelivered to the War Department. After a period in the National Defense Reserve Fleet at Suisun Bay, Benicia, California, she was sold to Boston Metals of Baltimore, Maryland, and scrapped in March 1948.

== Bibliography ==
- Clay, Steven E. (2011). U. S. Army Order Of Battle 1919-1941. Volume 4. The Services: Quartermaster, Medical, Military Police, Signal Corps, Chemical Warfare, And Miscellaneous Organizations, 1919-41. Fort Leavenworth, KS: Combat Studies Institute Press.
- Marine Review (1922). "1921 Construction Record of U.S. Yards". The Marine Review. 52 (February). New York: 77.
- McKellar, Norman L. "Steel Shipbuilding under the U. S. Shipping Board, 1917-1921, Part III, Contract Steel Ships". Steel Shipbuilding under the U. S. Shipping Board, 1917-1921. ShipScribe. p. 140b.
- Naval History And Heritage Command. "Henry T. Allen". Dictionary of American Naval Fighting Ships. Naval History And Heritage Command.
- Navsource. "USS Henry T. Allen (AG-90)". NavSource.
- U.S. Navy. "Seventh Amphibious Force—Command History—10 January 1943 – 23 December 1945". U.S. Navy.
- "New York Shipbuilding Corporation/Wenatchee on Way". Pacific Marine Review. 18 (April). San Francisco: J.S. Hines: 239, 251. 1921.
- "Admiral Line Expansion". Pacific Marine Review. 18 (August). San Francisco: J.S. Hines: 489. 1921.
- "Shipping Briefs/Todd Dry Docks, Inc". Pacific Marine Review. 18 (September). San Francisco: J.S. Hines: 550, 560. 1921.
- "What's In a Name: United States Shipping Board Emergency Fleet Corporation". Pacific Marine Review. 19 (January). San Francisco: J.S. Hines: 28. 1922.
- "Cost of U.S.S.B. Vessels". Pacific Marine Review. 19 (July). San Francisco: J.S. Hines: 434. 1922.
- "The Admiral-Oriental Line". Pacific Marine Review. 19 (December). San Francisco: J.S. Hines: 663. 1922.
- "Freights, Charters, Sales (reported 14 April 1926)". Pacific Marine Review. 23 (May). San Francisco: J.S. Hines: 235. 1926.
- Thompson, George Raynor; Harris, Dixie R.; Oakes, Pauline M.; Terrett, Dulany (1957). The Technical Services—The Signal Corps: The Test (December 1941 to July 1943). United States Army In World War II. Washington, DC: Center Of Military History, United States Army. LCCN 56-60003.
- Villard, Harold G., ed. (1921). "Wenatchee to Leave Soon for the Pacific". The Nautical Gazette. 100 (12 February 1921). New York: The Nautical Gazette, Inc.: 222.
- War Department (1919). War Department Annual Reports, 1919; Transports Building at Camden Yard. Washington: Government Printing Office. pp. 4994–4995.
