= SS President Garfield =

A number of ships were named President Garfield, including:

- SS President Garfield (1921)
- SS President Garfield (1940)
