= Design 1095 ship =

Design for a troop transport

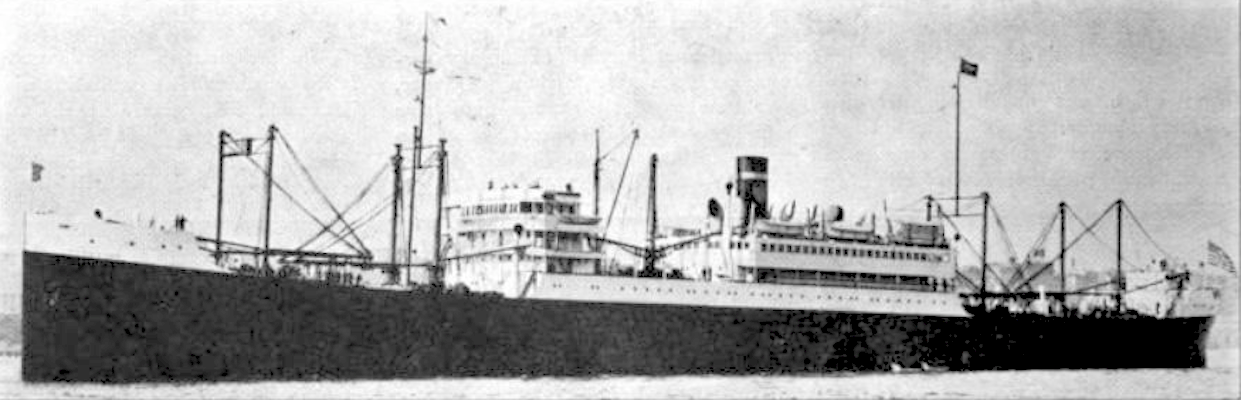
- Old North State

Class overview
- Builders: New York Shipbuilding Corporation
- Planned: 13 (6 changed to Design 1029 from keel)
- Building: 7
- Completed: 7
- Lost: 3
- Scrapped: 4

General characteristics
- Tonnage: 10,500 GRT 12,000 DWT
- Length: 522 ft 5 in (159.2 m) LOA; 502 ft (153.0 m) LBP
- Beam: 62 ft (18.9 m) (molded)
- Draft: 31 ft 9 in (9.7 m) (summer)
- Depth: (to "A" deck) 42 ft (12.8 m)
- Installed power: Six oil fired, single end Scotch boilers 13 ft 3 in (4.0 m) diameter by 11 ft 6 in (3.5 m) in length each with burners.
- Propulsion: Twin 16 ft 6 in (5.0 m) diameter screws driven by four cylinder triple expansion inverted, reciprocating engines with cylinders 24 in (0.61 m), 40.5 in (1.03 m), 54 in (1.37 m), and 54 in (1.37 m) with 45 in (1.14 m) stroke.
- Speed: 14 knots (16 mph; 26 km/h)
- Capacity: Passengers: 78 first class (later modified after going into service); Cargo: Total: 465,940 cubic feet (13,194.0 m^{3}) (bale); Cold storage: 52,300 cubic feet (1,481.0 m^{3})
- Crew: 115

The Design 1095 ship was an Emergency Fleet Corporation (EFC) design for a troop transport to be built at New York Shipbuilding Corporation and delivered to the United States Shipping Board (USSB) that, at the end of World War I hostilities, was modified to a combined passenger and cargo vessel. The contract was for thirteen ships, EFC hulls 2579 though 2591, but later adjusted to seven ships with the remainder being changed during construction to the slightly larger ships of EFC Design 1029 built from the start as passenger and cargo ships rather than being modified from the troop ship plan.

After initial service as USSB owned ships operated by agents, United States Lines in Atlantic service between New York and Europe with five ships and two ships with Swayne and Hoyt with the Pacific Argentine Brazil Line, the ships were sold in 1923 to Robert Dollar Company which initiated the Dollar and successor American President Lines' tradition of naming ships after presidents. The ships inaugurated Dollar's "Round-the-World" service which was continued by American President Lines with additional ships.

During World War II the seven ships were used as troop transports, three being converted to hospital ships (2 Army and 1 Navy) and three were lost. The three ships built as Old North State, Panhandle State and Blue Hen State became hospital ships and survived the war. Creole State served as a transport and began conversion to a hospital ship in the closing days of the war but the conversion stopped with peace upon which she was reconverted to become an Army transport for dependent repatriation. Two, President Taylor, built as Granite State and President Grant, built as Centennial State, became total losses after groundings. The ship built as Wolverine State and President Harrison at the time, was on a second voyage to evacuate Marines and civilians from China sailing after 7 December 1941, was grounded in an attempt to deny use by the Japanese, but salvaged and named Kachidoki Maru. While transporting British prisoners of war Kachidoki Maru was torpedoed and sunk by USS Pampanito on 12 September 1944.

== Initial design ==
All of the 10,500 GRT/12,000 DWT ships were modified over their operational life that extended into the post World War II years for the four that survived the war. The initial design was a modification of the original troop transport concept as part of a USSB program to increase overseas passenger and cargo capability with all first class accommodations on the "A", bridge and promenade decks for 78 passengers, a crew of 115 and significant cargo capacity. That plan changed for four of the ships assigned to North Atlantic routes even before commercial operation with addition of steerage, or Third Class, accommodations for carriage of immigrants. Those immigrant accommodations were of two types, one for tropical routes and one for North Atlantic routes with more stringent requirement for enclosed quarters due to the colder passage.

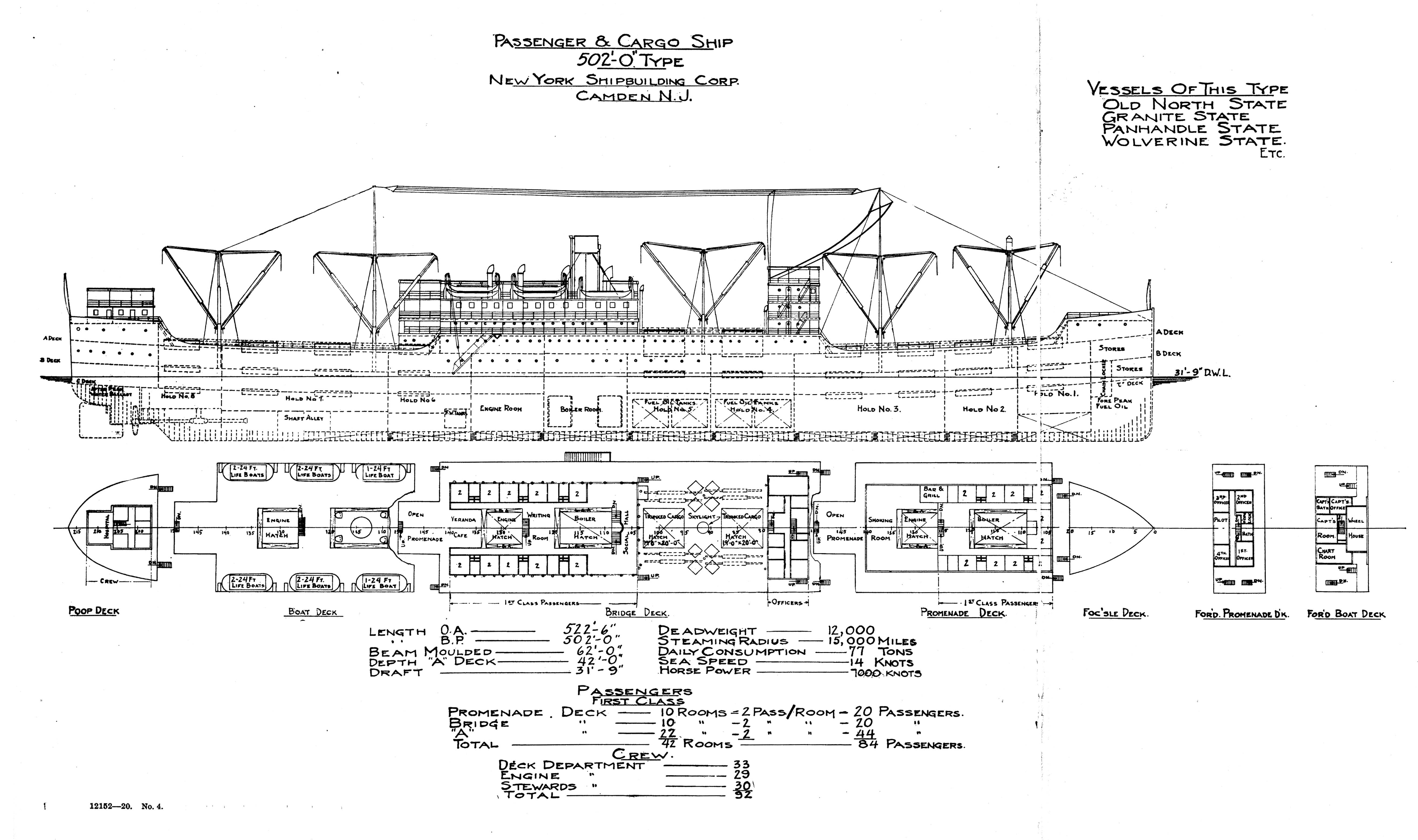
Outboard profile & deck plan

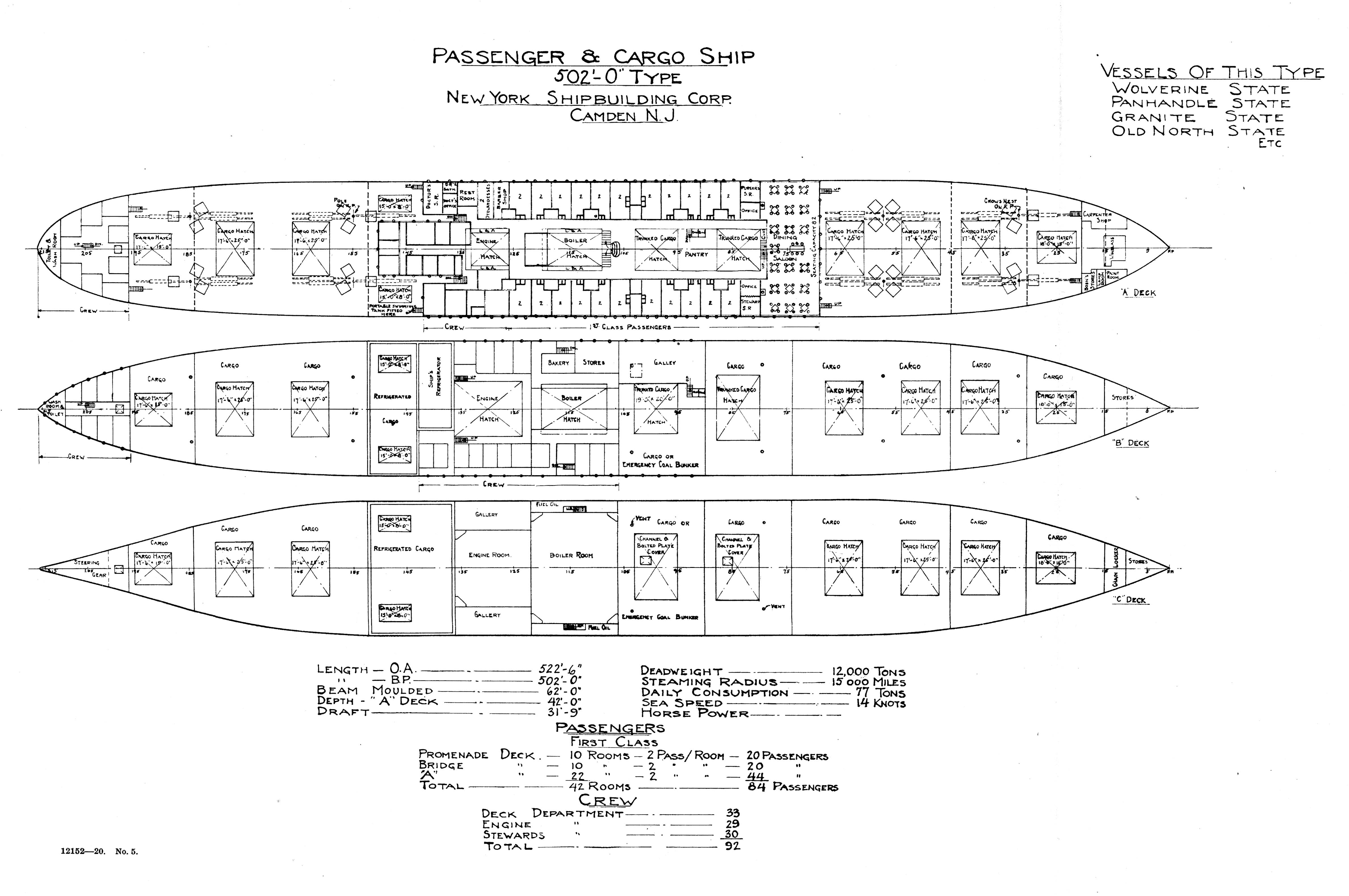
Deck plans

The transverse framed, 522 ft 5 in (159.2 m) length overall, 502 ft (153.0 m) length between perpendiculars double bottomed hull was divided into fourteen watertight compartments by watertight bulkheads extending up to "A" deck.

The cargo specifications for the seven ships were a bale cargo capacity of 465,940 cubic feet (13,194.0 m^{3}) of which 52,300 cubic feet (1,481.0 m^{3}) was cargo cold storage with separate meat and vegetable compartments insulated by layers of wood and cork. Under tropical conditions meat compartment was to maintain a temperature of 20 °F (−7 °C) and the vegetable compartment at 40 °F (4 °C). Multiple different sized hatches provide general cargo area. Cargo service was by means of thirty-two six ton booms and one thirty ton boom with ten kingpost.

Twin 16 ft 6 in (5.0 m) screws were driven by two triple expansion engines with four cylinders of 24 in (0.6 m), 50.5 in (1.3 m), 54 in (1.4 m) and 54 in (1.4 m) with 45 in (1.1 m) stroke provided steam from six oil fired Scotch boilers 11 ft 6 in (3.5 m) long and 15 ft 3 in (4.6 m) in diameter each fired by three 45 in (1.1 m) corrugated furnaces. Fuel capacity was 3,476 tons. The engines developed 6,000 indicated horsepower for a design service speed of 14 knots (16 mph; 26 km/h).

== Construction ==
All the Design 1095 and Design 1029 hulls were launched or completed, after numerous design changes, with the nicknames of states, resulting in an early "class" name of "State ships." By May 1922 the USSB renamed all the ships and all but four for United States presidents. The Design 1095 ships, all renamed for presidents, were:

- Old North State, hull #244, launched 29 February 1920, O/N 220709, President Van Buren, President Fillmore then United States Army Hospital Ship USAHS Marigold until scrapped as President Fillmore 1948.
- Creole State, hull #245, launched 2 April 1920, O/N 220858, President Hayes, President Tyler, became War Shipping Administration troop transport, acquired by War Department for conversion to a hospital ship to be named Howard A. McCurdy, conversion incomplete when war ended with President Tyler name retained, converted to carry dependents, scrapped 1957.
- Granite State, hull #246, launched 31 July 1920, O/N 221054, President Polk, President Taylor, became War Shipping Administration troop transport until stranded while landing troops to protect Canton (Kanton) Island 14 February 1942.
- Panhandle State, hull #247, launched 9 March 1920, O/N 220325, President Monroe, President Buchanan, then United States Army Hospital Ship Emily H. M. Weder then converted to an Army troop transport reusing the name President Buchanan.
- Wolverine State, hull #248, launched 16 September 1920, O/N 220952, President Harrison, chartered by United States Army to evacuate 4th Marines and lost on return trip for additional evacuation, salvaged by Japanese to become Kachidoki Maru sunk, while transporting British prisoners of war, by USS Pampanito on 12 September 1944.
- Centennial State, hull #249, launched 11 December 1920, O/N 221203, President Adams, President Grant then converted to United States Army troop transport, lost off Milne Bay 27 February 1944.
- Blue Hen State, hull #250, launched 23 February 1921, O/N 221426, President Garfield, President Madison, acquired by United States Navy, commissioned Kenmore then converted to hospital ship USS Refuge, returned to Maritime Commission 1946 and scrapped 1948.

== Service history ==
The nickname "State ships" covered both designs but they were also commonly known in the trade throughout their careers by names related to their length with the Design 1095 ships commonly being termed the "502s" for their length between perpendiculars and less frequently as "522s" for their length overall. In a switch for the basis for a common name the larger Design 1029 ships took the length overall for the "535s" name often used in the trade.

The ships were initially owned by the USSB and operated by shipping lines as agents. By September 1921 Centennial State, Old North State and Panhandle State were operated on an Atlantic route between New York, Queenstown, Boulogne and London with Blue Hen State and Centennial State being modified to carry steerage passengers in North Atlantic service. Only two of those ships would operate regularly between New York and London with Old North State and Panhandle State operating between New Orleans, Cuba and Spain carrying Spanish immigrants on the westbound voyage in "open" or "tropical" steerage accommodations. Creole State, Granite State and Wolverine State were being operated between San Francisco and India with calls at Honolulu, Manila, Saigon and Singapore before Colombo and Calcutta.

The "State" names were changed to the "President" names and in 1923 five of the ships President Adams (ex Centennial State), President Garfield (ex Blue Hen State), President Monroe (ex Panhandle State), President Polk (ex Granite State) and President Van Buren (ex Old North State) were being operated by United States Lines in Atlantic service between New York and Europe for the USSB. The other two, President Hayes (ex Creole State) and President Harrison (ex Wolverine State) were being operated by Swayne & Hoyt Lines as agent on a service connecting the United States West Coast to Brazil and Argentina with the Pacific-Argentine-Brazil Line. By September 1923 all the Design 1095 ships had been sold by the USSB to the Robert Dollar Company.The acquisition of these "President" ships started the Dollar and successor American President Lines' tradition of naming ships after presidents.

Dollar inaugurated a "Round-the-World" service using the seven ships with the sailing of President Harrison scheduled for 5 January 1924 out of San Francisco and President Adams on 7 February out of New York. The maintenance of a two-week schedule was to be established on the route of New York, Havana, Colon, Balboa, Los Angeles, San Francisco, Honolulu, Kobe, Shanghai, Hong Kong, Manila, Singapore, Penang, Colombo, Suez, Port Said, Alexandria, Naples, Genoa, Marseilles and Boston before return to New York with scheduled inaugural sailings of President Garfield from New York 21 February, President Polk 6 March, President Monroe 20 March, President Harrison 3 April after completing maiden around the world trip, President Van Buren 17 April and President Hayes departing again 1 May 1924. The service was expanded with acquisition of the larger Design 1029, the "535s", in 1926.

In 1938 the United States Maritime Commission, successor to the USSB, judged the Dollar company unsound and took over the assets including the ships to be operated by a new company, American President Lines. The seven "502s" were to remain on the Round the World service while the five "535s" along with larger and newer ship President Coolidge were to go into New York-San Francisco-Asiatic service.

== Bibliography ==
- APL (American President Lines). "APL History" (PDF). APL (American President Lines). Archived from the original (PDF) on September 23, 2015.
- Charles, Roland W. (1947). Troopships of World War II (PDF). Washington: The Army Transportation Association. LCCN 47004779. Archived from the original (PDF) on October 30, 2020.
- Faulkner, Paul (1923). "Pacific-Argentine-Brazil Line". Pacific Marine Review. 20 (February). San Francisco: J.S. Hines: 90–91.
- Faulkner, Paul (1923). "Old Glory Around the World!". Pacific Marine Review. 20 (December). San Francisco: J.S. Hines: 37.
- Hoffman, Gene (1938). "Full Steam Ahead for the American President Lines Round the World". Pacific Marine Review. 35 (November). San Francisco: J.S. Hines: 22–28.
- Marine Engineering (1920). "502-Foot Passenger and Cargo Vessels". Marine Engineering. 25 (April). New York: Aldrich Publishing Company: 265–269.
- Marine Review (1921). "1920 Construction Record of U.S. Yards". The Marine Review. 51 (February). New York: 99.
- Marine Review (1921). "American Liners for North Atlantic to Have Third Class Accommodations". The Marine Review. 51 (July). New York: 298–299.
- Marine Review (1921). ""Balance the Fleet" Adds Passenger Liners/Finish 23 Troop Ships After Armistice". The Marine Review. 51 (September). New York: 398–399.
- McKellar, Norman L. "Steel Shipbuilding under the U. S. Shipping Board, 1917–1921, Part III, Contract Steel Ships". Steel Shipbuilding under the U. S. Shipping Board, 1917–1921. ShipScribe.
- McKellar, Norman L. "Steel Shipbuilding under the U. S. Shipping Board, 1917–1921, Part V, Contract Steel Ships". Steel Shipbuilding under the U. S. Shipping Board, 1917–1921. ShipScribe.
- Naval History And Heritage Command. "Refuge". Dictionary of American Naval Fighting Ships. Naval History And Heritage Command.
- Pacific American Steamship Association; Shipowners Association of the Pacific Coast (1921). "Launchings". Pacific Marine Review. 18 (February). San Francisco: J.S. Hines: 113.
- Pacific American Steamship Association; Shipowners Association of the Pacific Coast (1921). "The New York Shipbuilding Corporation". Pacific Marine Review. 18 (April). San Francisco: J.S. Hines: 201–204.
- Pacific American Steamship Association; Shipowners Association of the Pacific Coast (1922). "Photo (caption)". Pacific Marine Review. 19 (March). San Francisco: J.S. Hines: 173.
- Pacific American Steamship Association; Shipowners Association of the Pacific Coast (1922). "Cost of U.S.S.B. Vessels". Pacific Marine Review. 19 (July). San Francisco: J.S. Hines: 434.
- Pacific American Steamship Association; Shipowners Association of the Pacific Coast (1923). "United States Lines". Pacific Marine Review. 20 (February). San Francisco: J.S. Hines: 81.
- Pacific American Steamship Association; Shipowners Association of the Pacific Coast (1923). "Ship Charters and Sales on the Pacific Coast". Pacific Marine Review. 20 (September). San Francisco: J.S. Hines: 37.
- Villard, Harold G., ed. (1921). "Launching of the Blue Hen State". The Nautical Gazette. 100 (March 5, 1921). New York: The Nautical Gazette, Inc.: 314.
