= SS American Legion =

American naval vessel

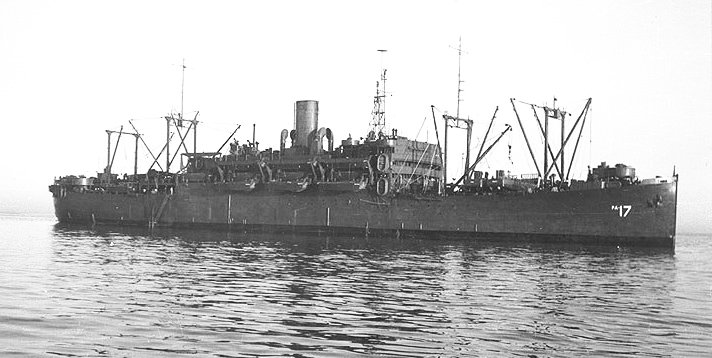
- As USS American Legion c. 1944–45

History

United States
- Name: American Legion
- Namesake: The American Legion, a patriotic organization
- Builder: New York Shipbuilding
- Cost: $7,309,189.37
- Yard number: 242
- Launched: 11 October 1919
- Sponsored by: Mrs. Joseph S. Frelinghuysen
- Christened: American Legion
- Acquired: (by the Navy) 22 August 1941
- Commissioned: (Navy) 26 August 1941
- Decommissioned: (Navy) 20 March 1946
- Maiden voyage: 23 July 1921
- Reclassified: AP-35 to APA-17, 1 February 1943
- Stricken: (Navy) 20 March 1946
- Identification: United States official number: 221478
- Honors and awards: Two battle stars for World War II service
- Fate: Sold for scrap, 5 February 1948

General characteristics
- Class & type: EFC Design 1029 ship; (Navy) Harris-class attack transport
- Displacement: 13,529 tons (lt), 21,900 t.(fl)
- Length: 535 ft 2 in (163.12 m)
- Beam: 72 ft (22 m)
- Draft: 31 ft 3 in (9.53 m)
- Propulsion: 2 × Westinghouse geared turbine drives, 8 × Babcock & Wilcox header-type boilers; 2 propellers, designed 12,000 shp (8,900 kW)
- Speed: 18 knots (33 km/h; 21 mph)
- Capacity: Troops: 107 Officers, 1,537 Enlisted; Cargo: 120,000 cu ft, 2,500 tons
- Complement: Officers 43, Enlisted 639
- Armament: 4 × 3"/50 cal. DP gun mounts, 2 × twin 40 mm gun mounts, 2 × quad 1.1"/75 caliber gun mounts, 10 × single 20 mm gun mounts.

American Legion was a United States Navy ship first launched on 11 October 1919 and decommissioned on 20 March 1946. She was built for the United States Shipping Board (USSB), one of the planned World War I troop transports converted before construction into passenger and cargo vessels, the Emergency Fleet Corporation Design 1029 ships. The ship was laid down as Koda and perhaps assigned the name Badger State at one point, but renamed American Legion before launch and one of only a few of the design not taking a state nickname. Originally operated by the USSB's agents and the Munson Steamship Line the ship saw commercial service until laid up 13 March 1939.

American Legion was formally transferred to the War Department for use as a United States Army transport on 19 December 1939 operating as USAT American Legion until transfer to the United States Navy 22 August 1941. The Navy commissioned the ship USS American Legion initially classifying the ship a transport with hull number AP-35. On 1 February 1943 the Navy reclassified the ship as an attack transport (Harris class) with hull number APA-17. American Legion decommissioned on 28 March 1946 and was sold for scrap 5 February 1948.

== Construction ==
American Legion was a steel-hulled, twin-screw passenger and cargo steamship, laid down as yard hull number 242 on 10 January 1919 under a United States Shipping Board (USSB) contract at Camden, New Jersey, by the New York Shipbuilding Corporation. The name was the result of efforts by William J. Brown, an Emergency Fleet Corporation inspector and member of the American Legion, who inspected the hull, proposed its name change to the Pennsylvania American Legion conference with passage of a resolution which was immediately publicized. A week from that publication the ship was launched as American Legion on 11 October 1919 with Emily Frelinghuysen, wife of New Jersey senator Joseph S. Frelinghuysen christening the ship. The ship, a type known in commercial service as "535's" for their length overall, was assigned the United States official number 221478.

The ship was one of three intended to become United States Army transports already under construction at the yard: hull 240 Wenatchee, hull 241 Sea Girt and hull 242 Koda. Of those one had been launched and a second was ready for launch when the USSB changed plans from troop transports to completion as passenger ships. At some point American Legion may have been assigned the name Badger State by USSB in conformance with the majority of the ships of the design but the three ships begun as Army transports when the design changed to passenger-cargo ships remained the only ones not formally assigned the state nicknames. (Note: McKellar only shows Koda and that name is shown along with two other ships, hull 240, Wenatchee (apparently initially C. M. Schwab) and hull 241, Sea Girt that was completed as Southern Cross, of the early New York Shipbuilding group of this type. Later references begin associating the name Badger State with the ship launched as American Legion and a few mention Badger State being the name at launch. The "State" names were assigned to new construction of this type intended from the start as commercial ships and Badger State may have been briefly assigned retroactively before efforts of the American Legion resulted in the name given for the organization. Contemporary sources make it clear the ship was launched as American Legion. A close look at the period shows proposed names existing only on paper in a number of cases.) In any case, the ship was launched as American Legion, a name exceptionally kept throughout the ship's career, and was delivered to the USSB upon completion on 15 July 1921.

Before delivery American Legion and Sea Girt, soon to become Southern Cross, were modified for tropical service carrying about 300 first class passengers.

== Commercial service ==
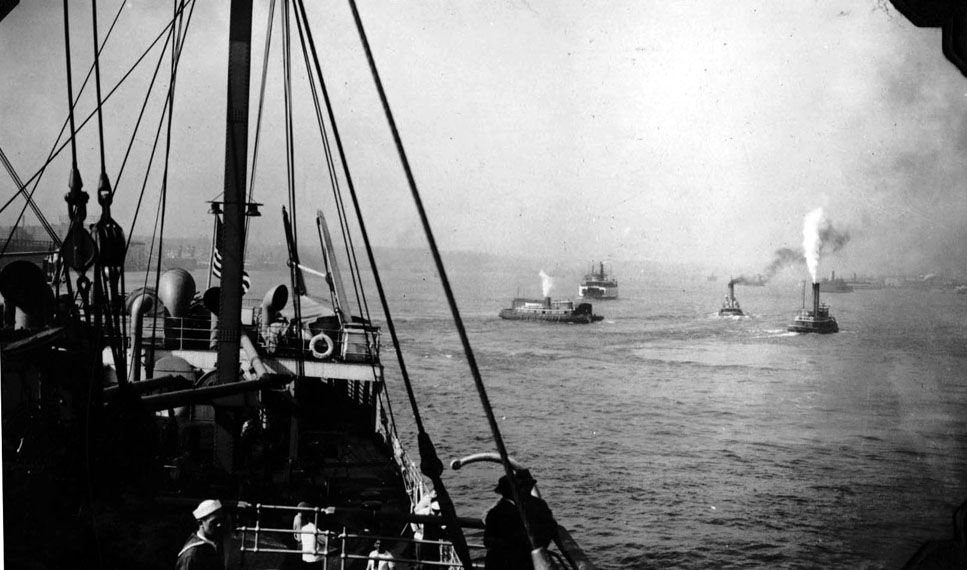
SS American Legion being towed up the River Plate transporting the 2nd Captain Marshall Field Paleontological Expedition in 1926

American Legion, flying the Munson Steamship Line's flag which had been allocated the ship for operation in fast passenger service to South American ports, left the Camden yards at five-thirty on the afternoon of 16 July 1921 for the one-day voyage to Hoboken, New Jersey with cabins filled with dignitaries. The line's founder and owner, Frank C. Munson, and his wife were hosts to a party composed of executives of New York Shipbuilding, USSB Commissioners, members of Congress and prominent members of the American Legion. Both National and regional officials of the American Legion had been guests at a dinner aboard prior to sailing and had passed a resolution expressing appreciation for the naming of the ship after the organization and resolved to present a plaque bearing the American Legion's emblem to the ship. The plaque, to hang in the ship's dining room, was presented in New York in 1922. At four-thirty on the afternoon of 17 July American Legion arrived at Pier 3, Hoboken. On 23 July 1921 the ship departed on her maiden voyage to South America.

American Legion, along with sister ship Southern Cross and the seized Norddeutscher Lloyd ships Aeolus and Huron allocated to Munson by the USSB after the war, began operating as the Pan America Line serving a New York-to-Rio de Janeiro, Montevideo, and Buenos Aires route with Santos, added during return voyages. On 31 August 1922, American Legion suffered a mishap in which she rammed several Argentine Navy ships; she split the despatch boats Azopardo in two and sank her and damaged the despatch boats Gaviota and La Pampa, the survey ship Alfarez Mackinlay, the troopship Patagonia, and the gunboat Patria.

By 1924 Aeolus and Huron had dropped off the New York-Rio de Janeiro-Montevideo-Buenos Aires route to be replaced by sister "535's" Pan America and Western World. The addition of the relatively fast "535's" on the direct route between New York and South America resulted in the British Lamport and Holt Line cutting its first class rates to South America, from $415 to $315 New York-Rio de Janeiro fare, and the USSB then cutting its rates to $295 for the same route and offering a round trip to Rio de Janeiro at $450.

As the USSB sold off its vessels the Munson Steamship Line bought the four vessels operating for its Pan America Line service in February 1926. Each ship, including American Legion, was purchased for a price of $1,026,000. For the next fourteen years, American Legion and her running-mates were familiar sights on that particular passenger-and-cargo route. By 1931 American Legion and her sister "535's" had been taken off the South American service and were running between New York and Bermuda. Financial difficulties forced foreclosure of the Munson Steamship Line on 13 March 1939 and American Legion was then laid up in the Patuxent River.

== Army troopship service ==
Her enforced idleness did not last long. A little under three months after the German invasion of Poland, triggering World War II in Europe, the Maritime Commission (the successor to the USSB) transferred American Legion to the War Department on 28 November 1939 for use as a troop transport. On 19 December 1939, the ship was formally transferred, and taken to New York for rehabilitation and conversion by the Atlantic Basin Iron Works of Brooklyn, New York.

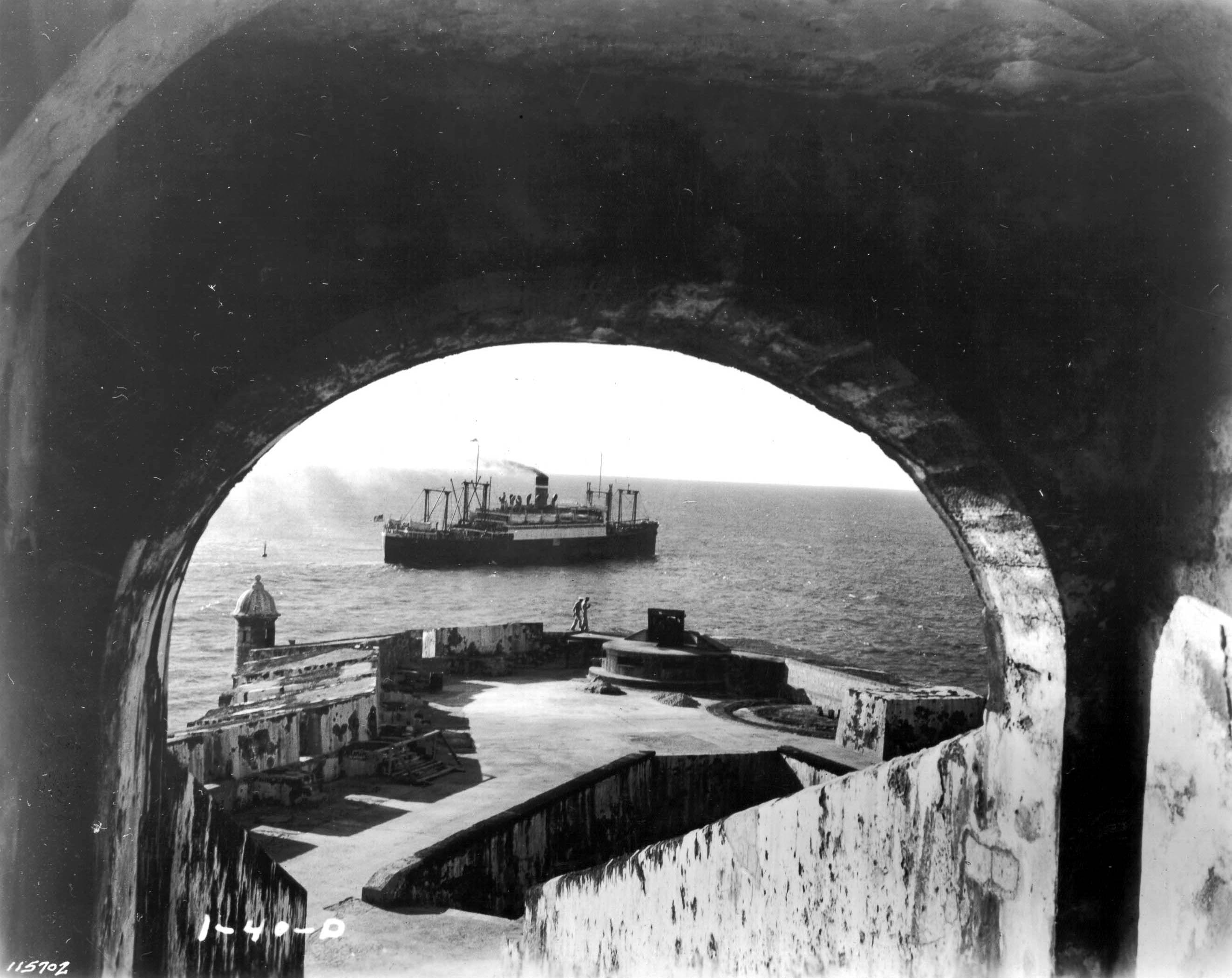
USAT American Legion departing San Juan Bay (part of El Morro Castle in foreground). 1940

USAT American Legion departed New York City early in February 1940, on her maiden voyage, bound for Panama. Over the next few months, the ship made five round-trip voyages to the Canal Zone, with stops at Charleston, South Carolina, and San Juan, Puerto Rico, carrying civilian and military passengers. The worsening situation in Europe, though, soon resulted in the ship's receiving a special mission.

=== Vital mission to Petsamo ===
President Franklin D. Roosevelt directed that American Legion leave New York immediately and proceed to Petsamo in northern Finland. There, she was to embark the Crown Princess Märtha of Norway and her party and bring them to the United States, their homeland having fallen to the Germans the previous spring. Further, as Acting Secretary of State Sumner Welles reported to the United States Minister in Sweden, the President also desired that Mrs. J. Borden Harriman, the former American Minister to Norway, return in the same vessel. The transport would "likewise bring back to this country such Americans in Scandinavian countries as can be accommodated and as may not be able to return safely in any other way."

American Legion — her neutrality shown clearly by the U.S. flags painted prominently on her sides — sailed for Finland on 25 July, and reached Petsamo on 6 August, as scheduled. On the 15th, she embarked Crown Princess Märtha, and her three children, the Princesses Ragnhild and Astrid, and Prince Harald. The Army troopship also embarked a host of American nationals and refugees from a variety of countries: Poland, Finland, Estonia, Latvia, Lithuania, Sweden, Norway, Denmark, Germany, and the Netherlands, the total number of people being 897. Among the passengers was a young Danish comedian and musician, Victor Borge. The American Legation in Stockholm, Sweden, also consented to the embarkation of 15 "prominent nationals of American republics...including the Mexican minister..."

Unbeknownst to probably all but a handful of individuals, American Legion also took on board an important cargo during her brief stay at Petsamo. Before she sailed on the 16th, after an almost Herculean effort involving taking this special cargo by truck the entire length of Sweden, the transport loaded a twin-mount 40-millimeter Bofors antiaircraft gun, "equipped with standard sight, and accompanied by spare parts and 3,000 rounds of ammunition." The State Department had obtained the cooperation of no less than three governments to make possible the shipment of the Bofors gun: British, Swedish, and Finnish. The move had been made none too soon, for American Legion was the last neutral ship permitted to leave Petsamo.

American Legion sailed for the United States on 16 August, and reached New York, 12 days later, escorted the final leg of the voyage by several American destroyers. The transport unloaded the Bofors brought from Petsamo, whence it was shipped to Dahlgren, Virginia, where it would be tested, and ultimately adopted by the US Navy and produced domestically. Its installation in American warships from late 1942 proved a significant upgrading to the antiaircraft capability of the ships of the US Navy.

=== Other transport missions ===
American Legion soon returned to the more prosaic calling she had pursued since earlier in the year, that of an Army transport, and resumed the regularly scheduled service between New York and the Panama Canal Zone. Ultimately, as the United States expanded her defense perimeter, American Legion supported this movement, transporting men and cargo to such ports as Hamilton, Bermuda, and Port-of-Spain, Trinidad, as well as to Cristóbal, in the Canal Zone.

As the United States began assuming a greater share of the Battle of the Atlantic, to aid the hard-pressed British, the 6th Marine Regiment was taken to Iceland, where it relieved a British garrison of defense duties. A second troop and supply movement followed. American Legion from New York on 27 July 1941, as part of a convoy which included within its escort the aircraft carrier USS Wasp.

American Legion — whose cargo included Army Air Corps gear earmarked for use by the 33rd Pursuit Squadron (whose Curtiss P-40 fighters were flown off from Wasp) — reached Reykjavík, Iceland, on 6 August. Unable to enter the inner harbor because of her deep draft, American Legion discharged her cargo and disembarked her passengers into tank lighters and motor launches over the days that followed, the cargo movement facilitated by marines and sailors from the ships.

== Navy commission ==
Having delivered the men and goods to Reykjavik, the convoy sailed on the 12th with its heavy escort and reached New York on 21 August. The next day, American Legion was acquired by the Navy and classified as a transport, AP-35. She was placed in commission on the afternoon of 26 August 1941.

American Legion, having shed her white Army transport livery for a more businesslike and somber dark gray, was towed to Pier 3, Army Transport Service Pier of Embarkation, Brooklyn, by four tugs, on 12 September, and commenced taking on cargo that afternoon. Shortly before noon the following day, she began embarking civilian passengers for her maiden voyage as a Navy transport.

=== Transport missions ===
Underway for the Gravesend Bay Explosive Anchorage soon afterwards, American Legion loaded a cargo of ammunition — under the supervision of a detail of Coast Guardsmen from USCGC Arundel — early that afternoon, and, after loading the balance of the cargo the following day, weighed anchor for Charleston, South Carolina, at 14:12. She reached her destination on the afternoon of 18 September.

There, she embarked contingents of troops slated for garrison duties, and sailed for Bermuda on the morning of 19 September. On the afternoon of 22 September, as she neared her destination, her local escort — two Army planes — arrived overhead and accompanied the ship on the last leg of her voyage. Ultimately, at 19:45 on 22 September, she moored in Hamilton harbor. She disembarked troops the following morning, and, the following afternoon, sailed for Puerto Rico.

American Legion reached San Juan three days later, mooring at Pier 7, Puerto Rico Dock Company, shortly after noon. There, she debarked civilian passengers as well as 33 Army officers and 176 men, and embarked passengers for the rest of the voyage. Underway on the afternoon of 29 September, the transport reached "Ceriseport" — the code name for St. John's, Antigua — the next morning. The ship there discharged more cargo and took on board another group of passengers on 2 October before she sailed on the morning of 4 October for Puerto Rico.

=== Taken in tow after breakdown ===
American Legion returned once more to San Juan on 8 October, mooring at 09:56 and disembarking naval enlisted passengers brought from Trinidad. Once more, her turnaround was comparatively swift, for she was underway again on the morning of 10 October, bound for Hamilton. late that afternoon, though, the ship's port main engine and steering engine proved troublesome. As American Legion limped back to San Juan, two Navy tugboats came out to assist, as did the lighthouse tender, USCGC Acacia. Ultimately, though, it was the small seaplane tender USS Thrush that came to the rescue, passing a line to the crippled transport at 16:50 and taking her in tow back to San Juan.

Following repairs, American Legion sailed for Hamilton on the morning of 18 October. Anchoring in Murray's Anchorage on the morning of the 21st, she embarked New York-bound passengers and took departure the same day. Ultimately, on 23 October, American Legion reached Pier 2, Army Base, Brooklyn, and disembarked her passengers — civilian workers and naval dependents evacuated from Puerto Rico. Underway soon afterwards, the transport anchored off Staten Island that same afternoon.

=== Overhaul and repairs ===
American Legion weighed anchor on the morning of the 24th and moored at the New York Navy Yard. Initially slated for repair work at the Morse Dry Dock Company, Brooklyn, the transport was taken, instead, to the Bethlehem Steel Company yard in Brooklyn, for completion of an overhaul. She remained there into January 1942.

Assigned to the Naval Transportation Service (NTS) on 6 February American Legion embarked men slated for duty at a destroyer base being established at Derry, Northern Ireland, and sailed, in convoy, on the first leg of her voyage, bound for Halifax. Engineering difficulties, however, soon came to the fore again, and "engineering unreliability" caused her to be sent to the Boston Navy Yard for repairs. Accordingly, escorted by the destroyers USS Nicholson and USS Lea, American Legion reached Boston on 4 March after a two-day passage from Nova Scotia. Ultimately deemed ready for service once more, American Legion reported for duty with the NTS on 28 March 1942.

=== Transfer to Pacific Theater ===
On 9 April 1942, American Legion sailed from New York for the Panama Canal Zone, bound, ultimately, for Tongatapu, in the Tonga, or Friendly Islands, which she reached on 8 May 1942. There she disembarked her passengers — Army officers, nurses, and enlisted men who were to establish a field hospital on Tongatapu — and proceeded on to Wellington, New Zealand, arriving there on 29 May. American Legion remained at Wellington through mid-July, earmarked for participation in the United States' first offensive landing operation in the Pacific War — the invasion of Guadalcanal, in the Solomons.

=== Invasion of Guadalcanal ===
Three days before she was to sail from Wellington, she received an augmentation of her antiaircraft battery — a dozen Oerlikon 20 mm cannon. Under the direction of the ship's executive officer, Comdr. Ratcliffe C. Welles, and the gunnery officer, Lt. Comdr. Elmore S. Pettyjohn, USNR, American Legion's ship's force installed the battery on the ship's former sun deck in 48 hours, laboring continuously in inclement weather and having the battery in firing order by the time the ship upped-anchor and sailed on 18 July. Rendezvousing with Task Force 44 (TF-44) on the following day, the transport, with elements of the 5th Marine Regiment embarked, proceeded to Koro Island, in the Fiji Islands, for rehearsals for Operation Watchtower. During that training and practice evolution, the ship embarked war correspondent Richard Tregaskis, whose experiences would later be chronicled in the book, Guadalcanal Diary.

Assigned to Task Group "X-ray", ten attack transports and five attack cargo ships, American Legion proceeded thence to the Solomon Islands. On the morning of 7 August 1942, she went to general quarters at 05:45 and manned "ship to shore" stations fifteen minutes later. At 06:14, attending cruisers and destroyers opened fire on the beachheads, softening up the beaches for the impending landing. American Legion and USS Fuller soon landed the first troops to go ashore on Guadalcanal.

That afternoon, while the landings proceeded apace, American Legion joined in the antiaircraft barrage that repelled the initial Japanese air attacks on the invasion fleet, as she did the next day. Discharging cargo at "Red" Beach on the morning of 8 August, the transport got underway as a wave of Japanese twin-engined bombers came after the shipping off Guadalcanal. At noon, American Legion sighted the incoming planes, which dropped their bombs near the supporting cruisers and destroyers before heading toward the amphibious ships.

During the action, one Mitsubishi G4M1 Type 97 land attack plane ("Betty") passed from starboard to port directly over American Legion's stern, at 100 feet (30 m). The after 20-millimeter guns and .50-caliber machine guns — as well as the larger 3-inch (76 mm) guns — all opened up in a deadly fusillade, while men on board the transport could see the Japanese aircrew using their own machine guns to sweep the decks with gunfire. Some of this return fire fatally wounded Seaman 1st Class Charles Kaplan. Riddled from practically all quarters, the "Betty" crashed into the water close aboard on the port quarter.

==== Rescue mission ====
American Legion, still lay off "Red" Beach in the predawn hours of the 9th, too, and began observing heavy gunfire commencing at 01:48 to the northwestward. Lookouts also saw flares and tracers, with parachute flares brightly lighting up the area to the northeastward. Transport Group "X-ray" ceased discharging cargo and darkened ship, remaining shut down for the rest of the night, crews at general quarters. American Legion's men did not know it at the time, but they were witnessing the disastrous Battle of Savo Island, in which three American heavy cruisers were sunk, one American heavy cruiser damaged and an Australian heavy cruiser sunk.

The next morning, the transport began embarking survivors from the sunken heavy cruiser USS Quincy and from the destroyer USS Ellet, completing the transfer by 14:00. Within a half-hour, American Legion got underway, the majority of her cargo having been unloaded by her busy boat crews who had labored almost continuously since the 7th with almost no sleep and subsisting only on sandwiches and coffee. She left behind one officer and 19 enlisted men as part of the burgeoning naval base at Guadalcanal, having transferred them on the evening of the 8th.

American Legion, with the rest of the amphibious ships of TF 62, then proceeded to Nouméa, New Caledonia, which she reached on 13 August. Soon afterwards she transferred her Quincy survivors to the auxiliary USS Argonne and the transport USS Wharton.

==== Supply runs ====
Over the next several months, American Legion carried out a series of supply runs, including as ports of call Guadalcanal;Tulagi; Auckland, New Zealand; Nouméa; Brisbane, Australia; and Espiritu Santo, in the New Hebrides. She arrived at Brisbane on New Year's Day 1943 and sailed soon afterwards for Melbourne, Australia; thence she proceeded to Tongatapu, Pago Pago, Espiritu Santo, and Guadalcanal. Early in this period, on 1 February 1943, the ship was reclassified to an attack transport APA-17. She then carried out a series of training landings at Naval Base Upolu, Upolu, American Samoa, between 9 April and 10 May 1943, and then later at New Zealand, at Paekākāriki, between 13 and 16 June. While there, a landing accident claimed the lives of one officer and nine enlisted men when one of American Legion's landing boats capsized in a heavy surf.

=== Invasion of Bougainville ===
Troop and cargo runs then followed, between Auckland, New Zealand; Nouméa, New Caledonia; and Guadalcanal, before she put into Efate, in the New Hebrides, on 22 October 1943, in preparation for the invasion of Bougainville, Solomon Islands.

Arriving off Cape Torokina, Bougainville, on the morning of 1 November 1943, American Legion proceeded into the earmarked transport area in Empress Augusta Bay and anchored at 06:46. Japanese planes arriving in the vicinity prompted the ships to get underway, the transport's men observing Aichi D3A2 Type 99 "Val" carrier attack planes attacking nearby destroyers and losing two or three of their number in the process. "Zeke" (Mitsubishi A6M "Zero") fighters then strafed the beach area; sinking an LCPL from American Legion.

==== Temporarily grounded ====
Securing from general quarters at 09:37, American Legion anchored in the transport area a few moments later, observers on board noting beaches Red 2 and 3 littered with broached landing craft, two LCMs and four LCVPs from American Legion among them. Ordered to cease unloading off Beach Red 2 and to proceed to Beach Blue 3, the transport got underway and proceeded thence, soon noting the presence of shoal water. At 12:46, the ship's war diary recounts "several slight shocks to hull" as American Legion grounded. Ten minutes later, enemy planes were reported approaching, as the ship began using her engines in an attempt to work herself free of her predicament. While the other ships in the task unit got underway and stood out, American Legion remained fast aground. The ship, assisted in the effort by USS Sioux and USS Apache, fired on "Vals" attacking the beachhead, and eventually worked free by 15:06. After standing out to sea during the night, the transport returned to the transport area the following morning and completed discharging cargo.

Following the landings at Cape Torokina, American Legion returned to the United States via Pago Pago, Samoa, and reached San Francisco on 8 December 1943, having traveled 83,140 nautical miles (153,980 km; 95,680 mi) since leaving New York the previous spring. She then underwent repairs at San Francisco into the spring of 1944.

=== Amphibious warfare training ship ===
Departing San Francisco on 12 April 1944, American Legion proceeded to San Diego where she became part of the Transport Training Division, Amphibious Training, Pacific. Based at the Amphibious Training Case at Coronado, California, American Legion operated in the training capacity for the duration of World War II, exercising off Coronado, off Aliso Canyon, near Oceanside, California, and the Marine Corps Base, Camp Pendleton, and at Pyramid Cove, near San Clemente Island.

Departing San Diego on 7 September 1945, American Legion proceeded to San Francisco, stopping there only briefly before sailing on 11 September for Pearl Harbor and Guam. Returning to San Pedro on 24 October, American Legion sailed for her second Pacific voyage on 8 November, bound for the Philippines. After calling at Manila and Tacloban, the veteran transport returned to the United States, reaching San Francisco on 12 December 1945.

=== Decommission ===
Clearing that port for the last time on 6 March 1946, she reached Olympia, Washington, on the 9th. She was decommissioned there on 28 March 1946 and was turned over to the War Shipping Administration for disposal. Her name was struck from the Naval Vessel Register the same day. She was ultimately sold for scrap on 5 February 1948 to Zidell Ship Dismantling Company, of Portland, Oregon.

=== Awards ===
- American Defense Service Medal
- American Campaign Medal
- European-African-Middle Eastern Campaign Medal
- Asiatic-Pacific Campaign Medal with two battle stars
- World War II Victory Medal

== Bibliography ==
- American Legion Weekly (1920). "The American Legion Ready Soon". The American Legion Weekly. 2 (8 October 1920). New York: The Legion Publishing Corporation: 22.
- American Legion Weekly (1921). "Aboard the American Legion". The American Legion Weekly. 3 (29 July 1921). New York: The Legion Publishing Corporation: 19.
- American Legion Weekly (1922). "The Spirit That Goes to Sea". The American Legion Weekly. 4 (26 May 1922). New York: The Legion Publishing Corporation: 15.
- Charles, Roland W. (1947). Troopships of World War II (PDF). Washington: The Army Transportation Association. p. 7. LCCN 47004779. Archived from the original (PDF) on 2 April 2015.
- Larsson, Björn (15 November 2009). "Munson Line". Maritime Timetable Images. Björn Larsson.
- Marine Engineering (1921). "Steamship American Legion on Maiden Voyage After Trial Trip". Marine Engineering. 26 (August). New York: Aldrich Publishing Company: 643.
- Marine Review (1922). "1921 Construction Record of U.S. Yards". The Marine Review. 51 (February). New York: 77.
- McKellar, Norman L. "Steel Shipbuilding under the U. S. Shipping Board, 1917-1921, Part III, Contract Steel Ships". Steel Shipbuilding under the U. S. Shipping Board, 1917-1921. ShipScribe. p. 140b.
- Naval History And Heritage Command. "American Legion". Dictionary of American Naval Fighting Ships. Naval History And Heritage Command.
- "What's In a Name: United States Shipping Board Emergency Fleet Corporation". Pacific Marine Review. 19 (January). San Francisco: J.S. Hines: 28. 1922.
- "Cost of U.S.S.B. Vessels". Pacific Marine Review. 19 (July). San Francisco: J.S. Hines: 434. 1922.
- Villard, Harold G., ed. (1921). "First 535's For Munson Line". The Nautical Gazette. 100 (12 February 1921). New York: The Nautical Gazette, Inc.: 222.
- Villard, Harold G., ed. (1922). "Drastic Cut in S. American Rates". The Nautical Gazette. 102 (29 April 1922). New York: The Nautical Gazette, Inc.: 527.
- United States Shipping Board (1926). Tenth Annual Report of the United States Shipping Board. Washington.
- War Department (1919). War Department Annual Reports, 1919; Transports Building at Camden Yard. Washington: Government Printing Office. pp. 4994–4995.
