= USS Harris =

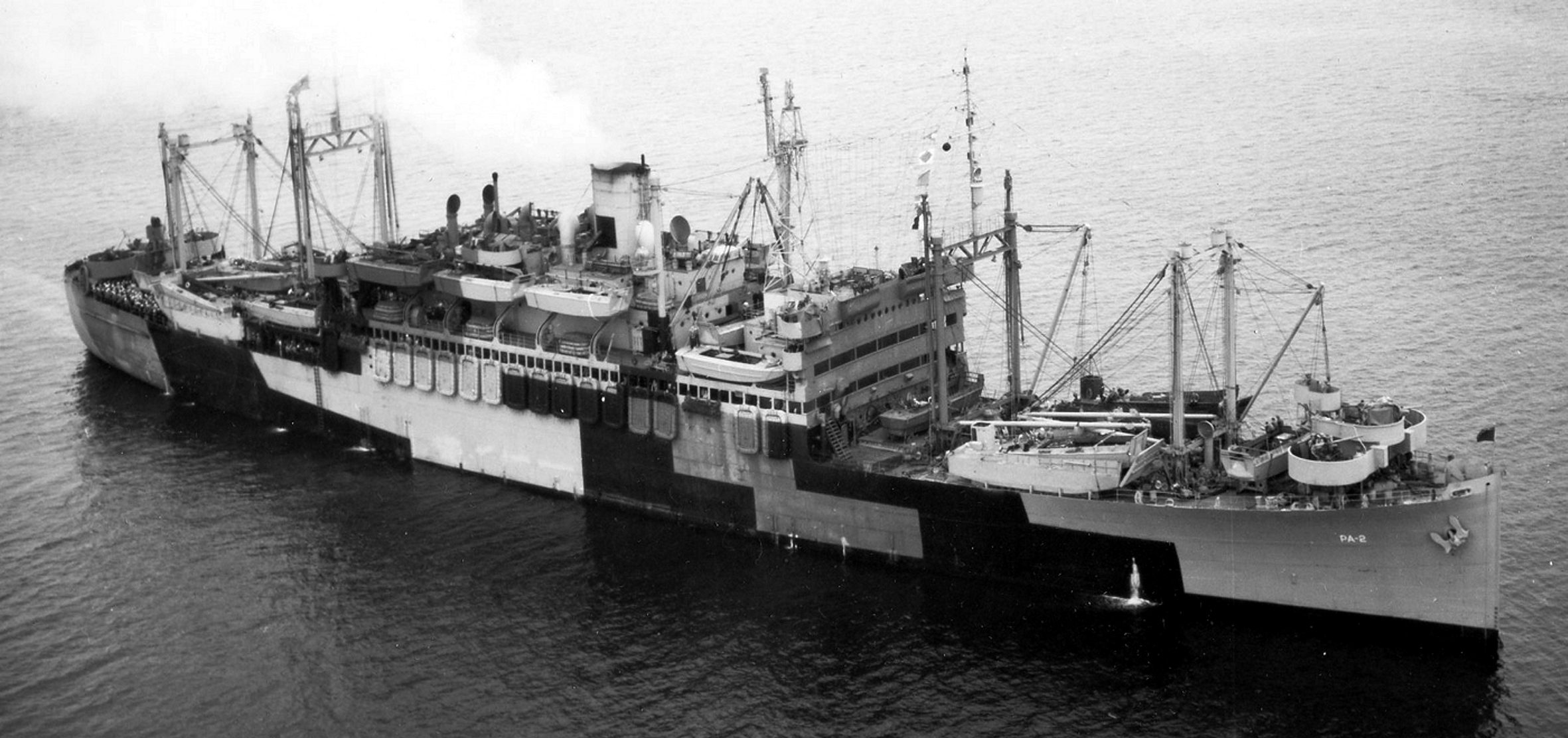
- Harris on 2 May 1944

History

United States
- Name: Pine Tree State; President Grant; Harris
- Namesake: Colonel John Harris of the United States Marine Corps
- Builder: Bethlehem Steel
- Launched: 19 March 1921
- Christened: Pine Tree State
- Acquired: Delivered: 3 November 1921; By Navy: 17 July 1940
- Commissioned: (As AP-8) 19 August 1940
- Decommissioned: 16 April 1946
- Reclassified: AP-8 to APA-2, 1 February 1943
- Stricken: 12 April 1946
- Identification: U.S. official number: 221633
- Honours and awards: Ten battle stars for World War II service
- Fate: Sold for scrap, 20 July 1948

General characteristics
- Class & type: EFC Design 1029; (Navy) Harris-class attack transport
- Displacement: 13,529 tons (lt), 21,900 t.(fl)
- Length: 535 ft 2 in
- Beam: 72 ft 4 in
- Draft: 31 ft 3 in
- Propulsion: 2 x Curtis type turbines, 8 x Yarrow header-type boilers, 2 propellers, designed shaft horsepower 12,000.
- Speed: 17 knots
- Capacity: Troops: 126 Officers, 1,557 Enlisted; Cargo: 190,000 cu ft, 2,200 tons
- Complement: Officers 37, Enlisted 585
- Armament: 4 x 3"/50 caliber dual-purpose gun mounts, 2 x twin 40mm gun mounts, 10 x single 20mm gun mounts.

USS Harris (APA-2) was an Emergency Fleet Corporation Design 1029 ship launched for the United States Shipping Board (USSB) on 19 March 1921 by Bethlehem Shipbuilding Corporation, at Sparrows Point, Maryland as Pine Tree State. After operation by commercial lines for the USSB during which the ship was renamed President Grant it was laid up in the late 1930s.

After Navy acquisition in July 1940 the ship was first classified as a transport, hull number AP-8 and then reclassified to Harris-class attack transport, hull number APA-2, that served with the U.S. Navy during World War II. She was the lead ship in her class.

== Construction ==
Pine Tree State was an Emergency Fleet Corporation (EFC) Design 1029 ship launched 19 March 1921 by the Bethlehem Shipbuilding Corporation, at Sparrows Point, Maryland. The ship was delivered 3 November 1921 and assigned the U. S. official number 221633.

== Commercial service ==
She served as a passenger ship, Pine Tree State, and was renamed President Grant in 1922. She operated to the Orient for American Orient Lines, later American Mail Lines, and was one of America's fastest and best Pacific liners until the introduction of newer ships in the thirties. President Grant was idled by the 1936-37 Maritime strike, and lay at Seattle until being taken over by the Navy from the Maritime Commission 17 July 1940.

== World War II ==
Converted to a troopship (hull ID no. AP-8) at Todd's Seattle yard, she was renamed Harris and commissioned 19 August 1940.

Harris spent the first few months of her commissioned service carrying troops to Pearl Harbor and acting as a troop training ship at San Diego. She sailed 13 April 1942 for the South Pacific, carrying Marines to occupy strategic points outside the Japanese perimeter of conquest. Her task group arrived Wallis Island 31 May 1942 and unloaded troops for the defense of the New Caledonia area. Harris then returned to the United States and operated out of Monterey Bay, California, in amphibious training. This vital work was completed 22 August 1942, and she sailed from San Diego for Norfolk, Virginia.

=== North African landings ===
After suffering collision damage which necessitated her drydocking until 14 October, Harris loaded troops at Norfolk to begin training for landings in North Africa. She departed 23 October with the Southern Attack Force, and acted as flagship for the transport force. This invasion, skillfully executed, increased the pressure on Axis forces in Africa, and prepared a springboard for invasion of Southern Europe. Harris arrived offshore early on 8 November 1942 and after the destroyers Bernadou and Cole boldly entered the harbor with raider forces, debarked her Army troops to consolidate the landing. One of the first transports to complete disembarkation, Harris returned to Norfolk 13 November.

=== Pacific operations ===
==== Aleutians ====
She got underway 5 December with combat troops for the Pacific, arriving San Diego 17 December. There she trained and was redesignated APA-21 before sailing from San Francisco for Alaska 24 April 1943 to take part in the recapture of Attu.

Harris arrived Cold Harbor 30 April and 4 days later shaped course for the barren Aleutian Islands. She skillfully debarked her troops during the assault 11 May. She remained in the Adak-Dutch Harbor area until 10 June 1943, when she returned to San Diego. After training off California, Harris and other ships of the Northern Pacific Force sailed 29 July for the occupation of another Aleutian Island, Kiska. Landings were made without opposition 15 August, as the Japanese had evacuated under cover of fog. Harris completed her unloading by 21 August and returned to San Francisco 31 August.

==== Invasion of Tarawa ====
As United States power mounted in the Western Pacific Harris sailed 8 September for New Zealand via Nouméa. Arriving Wellington, New Zealand on 30 September, she loaded Marines and trained out of Wellington and Efate, New Hebrides, until 13 November 1943. Harris then sailed with the Southern Attack Force for the invasion of Tarawa, Gilbert Islands, as the Navy began its resistless push across Micronesia to Japan. Harris arrived the day after the initial landings on 20 November. Despite fire from shore batteries she discharged her troops and cargo during the days that followed. She remained off the stubbornly defended island caring for casualties and unloading until 2 December, when she sailed for Pearl Harbor.

==== Invasion of Kwajalein ====
Arriving Pearl Harbor 14 December 1943, Harris took part in amphibious drills for the next step toward Japan, the invasion of the Marshalls. She sailed 22 January 1944 and arrived off Kwajalein 31 January. After a week of bloody fighting in this highly successful assault troops and casualties were reembarked on board Harris 8 February and arrived Pearl Harbor 15 February.

==== Invasion of Saipan ====
Harris sailed to San Pedro for needed repairs, and returned to Pearl Harbor 9 May 1944. She immediately began loading troops and equipment for another important Pacific operation, the invasion of the Marianas. She arrived off Saipan 16 June, one day after the initial landings, and remained in the transport area until 20 June. With the Marianas won, and Japanese air power dealt a crippling blow in the Battle of the Philippine Sea, Harris sailed for Eniwetok, arriving 24 June.

==== Invasion of Palau Islands ====
The veteran transport returned to the Hawaiian Islands and the Solomons 21 July to 8 September, in order to prepare for the next assault. She then sailed from Guadalcanal for the invasion of the Palaus, wanted as staging bases for later air attacks. Harris conducted a diversionary landing 15 September on Babelthuap while the main forces stormed Peleliu, and after standing ready with her reserve troops for several days, sailed for Ulithi. Arriving 23 September, Harris put her troops ashore to occupy this atoll, ideal for a fleet anchorage, and departed 2 days later for Manus.

==== Invasion of the Philippines ====
The invasion of the Philippines followed. Harris embarked elements of the 1st Cavalry Division and sailed for Leyte Gulf 12 October. After having to leave the formation temporarily to free her paravane from a dangerous live mine, Harris regained position and unloaded her troops and cargo, 20 October. Following the decisive Battle of Leyte Gulf, Harris took on board survivors of the gallant fight off Samar between heavy Japanese forces and light U.S. carriers and destroyers. She departed 28 October, arriving Guam 3 days later, and returned to Leyte Gulf with reinforcements. Harris then sailed for Guadalcanal and Bougainville for additional troops and spent December 1944 in landing exercises in Huan Gulf.

Harris departed Manus 31 December to rendezvous with the assault forces steaming toward Lingayen Gulf. The convoys encountered some of the heaviest air attacks of the war en route, and Harris's gunner were busy, especially 8 to 9 January 1945, the days immediately preceding the assault. She debarked her troops under heavy smoke screen, and departed for Leyte Gulf. Here she embarked more landing forces that she soon landed at La Paz without opposition as the invasion of Luzon gathered momentum. She returned to Leyte Gulf 1 February.

==== Invasion of Okinawa ====
Loading again, Harris prepared to take part in the final step in the steady drive to victory, the invasion of Okinawa. She sailed 27 March and arrived offshore for the initial landings 1 April, a member of Rear Admiral Hall's Southern Attack Force. Fierce enemy suicide attacks soon developed, and again Harris's gunners fought off numerous attacks as ships around her were hit. She completed her unloading under these hazardous conditions by 3 April and departed for Pearl Harbor 6 April.

Harris continued to San Francisco, arriving 30 April, but soon returned to the fighting, bringing fresh troops to Okinawa 28 May. After another round trip from Pearl Harbor to Okinawa, the ship arrived Ulithi 10 August, having narrowly missed the great August typhoon.

=== After hostilities ===
Assigned to assist in carrying occupation troops to Japan, Harris sailed to the Philippines 17 August, and arrived Tokyo Bay 8 September. After disembarking her troops Harris made another voyage to Samar for occupation troops, finally departing Japan 12 October. The ship made its final occupation voyage to Taku Bar, China helping to stabilize the volatile situation there, and sailed 16 November for Guam and the West Coast.

=== Decommission ===
Harris transited the Panama Canal, arrived Boston 2 February 1946 and decommissioned 16 April. She was sold to American Ship Breakers, Inc., 20 July 1948 and scrapped.

Harris received ten battle stars for World War II service.

== Bibliography ==
- Colton, T. (5 October 2014). "Bethlehem Steel Company, Sparrows Point MD". Shipbuilding History. T. Colton. Archived from the original on 3 March 2016.
- Marine Review (1922). "1921 Construction Record of U.S. Yards". The Marine Review. 52 (February). New York: 75.
- Naval History And Heritage Command. "Harris". Dictionary of American Naval Fighting Ships. Naval History And Heritage Command.
- McKellar, Norman L. "Steel Shipbuilding under the U. S. Shipping Board, 1917-1921, Part III, Contract Steel Ships". Steel Shipbuilding under the U. S. Shipping Board, 1917-1921. ShipScribe.
- Wright, Christopher C. (1998). "Question 17/97: Screen of Convoys that Includes USS McCawley, April–May 1942". Warship International. XXXV (3). International Naval Research Organization: 307–313. ISSN 0043-0374.
