= MacGillivray Milne =

U.S. Navy officer and governor (1882–1959)

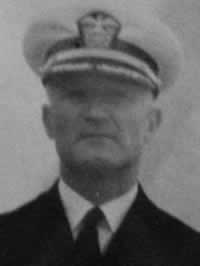

Governor of American Samoa
- In office January 20, 1936 – June 3, 1938
- Preceded by: Thomas Benjamin Fitzpatrick
- Succeeded by: Edward Hanson

Personal details
- Born: August 19, 1882 Gauley Bridge, West Virginia
- Died: 26 January 1959 (aged 76) Naval Hospital Oakland in Oakland, California
- Spouse: Natalie Elise Blauvelt
- Education: United States Naval Academy
- Occupation: Naval officer

Military service
- Allegiance: United States
- Branch/service: United States Navy
- Rank: Captain
- Commands: USS Tulsa (PG-22); USS Arizona (BB-39); Modern Languages Department of the United States Naval Academy

MacGillivray Milne (August 19, 1882 – January 26, 1959) was a United States Navy captain, and the governor of American Samoa from January 20, 1936, to June 3, 1938. After graduating from the United States Naval Academy, Milne served many posts in the Navy, including heading the Department of Modern Languages at the Naval Academy. He was a veteran of a large numbers of conflicts, including the Philippine–American War, the United States occupation of Veracruz, and both World War I and World War II. Milne commanded a number of ships, but his last one was the battleship USS Arizona (BB-39). After the ship struck a private fishing vessel and killed two civilians, Milne was court-martialed and stripped of three grades which determined his eligibility for promotion. As governor, Milne pushed for the modernization of American Samoa, and sought increased federal aid for the islands; his efforts to obtain additional funding for the island largely ended in failure. He died in 1959 at the Naval Hospital Oakland, and was buried in Sparkill, Rockland County, New York.

== Early life ==
Milne was born on August 19, 1882, in Gauley Bridge, West Virginia. He married Natalie Elise Blauvelt on June 2, 1917. He lived most of his ashore life in Newport, Rhode Island. Because of his difficult to spell and overly-long given name, Milne always signed official letters "M. Milne".

== Naval service ==
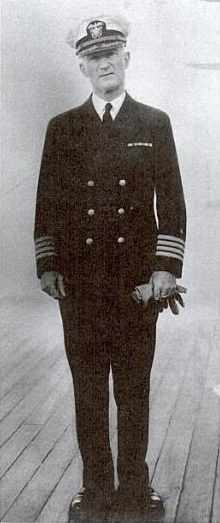
Milne aboard the USS Arizona.

Milne graduated from the United States Naval Academy in 1903, and served as a naval officer in multiple different wars, including the Philippine–American War, the United States occupation of Veracruz, and both World War I and World War II. He served a post at the United States Naval Academy. While there, he joined a panel of three other officers in researching the scholarship of student athletes at the Academy over a period of thirty years. The panel found that these athletes were likely to stay in the United States Navy for long periods of time, and were often career minded. At the Academy, Milne also served as head of the modern languages department.

In 1932, Milne was one of few American military officers chosen to travel to Italy to inspect a number of war veterans alongside Italian dictator Benito Mussolini. Mussolini had invited officers from numerous countries in an effort to improve relations.

Milne then commanded the USS Arizona when, in 1934, the battleship collided with the private fishing vessel Umatilla off the coast of Neah Bay, Washington, on July 26, 1934. The collision split the Umatilla in half, and two of its crew drowned. Milne underwent a court martial, where the blame for the crash was placed upon him. The court stripped him of three grades of seniority within his rank, making it very difficult for him to be promoted. Milne had been ranked 149th in the Navy register, but retired with the rank he had at this time, that of Captain. Officials stated that the real punishment came from the "black mark" the court martial left upon Milne's record. His position on the Arizona ended soon after his conviction.

== Governorship ==
Milne became the Governor of American Samoa on January 20, 1936, relieving Thomas Benjamin Fitzpatrick from command. He took steps in modernizing American Samoa; his wife appealed directly to First Lady of the United States Eleanor Roosevelt to help improve the state of the islands' indoor plumbing and sanitation systems. Among his projects, Milne tried to have a library built for use by the Samoans. Despite these efforts, neither of the two were able to acquire federal aid for the improvement of infrastructure. During his term, the inhabitants of American Samoa became increasingly Americanized.

During Governor MacGillivray Milne’s tenure, major advances in Pacific air travel occurred. On March 17, 1937, a Pan American flying boat, the Pan American Clipper (later Samoan Clipper), inaugurated the San Francisco–Kingman Reef–Pago Pago–Auckland route. It reached Pago Pago Bay on March 24, 1937, on the first leg from Hawaiʻi to Auckland. The aircraft continued transoceanic service until it exploded near Pago Pago on January 11, 1938.
