= Thomas Benjamin Fitzpatrick =

United States naval officer (1896–1974)

Governor of American Samoa
- In office January 15, 1936 – January 20, 1936
- Preceded by: Otto Carl Dowling
- Succeeded by: MacGillivray Milne

Personal details
- Born: 1896
- Died: 1974 (aged 77–78)
- Spouse: Pauline Case Fitzpatrick (1894-1977)
- Occupation: Naval officer

Military service
- Allegiance: United States
- Branch/service: United States Navy
- Rank: Commander
- Commands: USS Zeilin

Thomas Benjamin Fitzpatrick (1896 – 1974) was a United States Navy Commander and the governor of American Samoa for a brief time from January 15, 1936, to January 20, 1936. During World War II, Fitzpatrick commanded USS Zeilin, which landed troops and sustained damage during the Battle of Tarawa.
