= USS Zeilin (APA-3) =

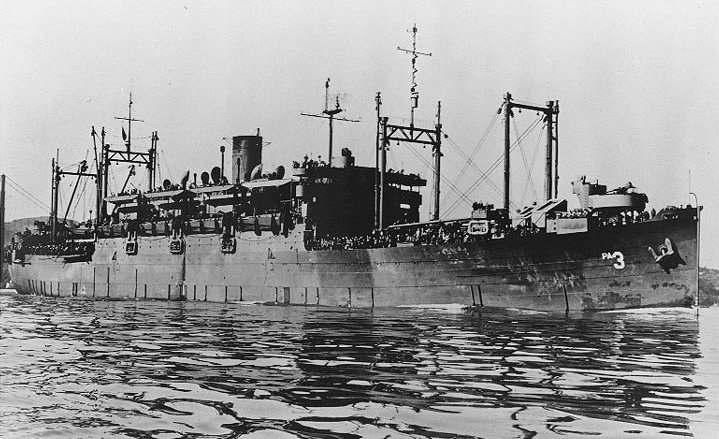
- USS Zeilin (APA-3) in San Francisco Bay, late 1945.

History

United States
- Name: Zeilin
- Namesake: Brigadier General Jacob Zeilin, USMC
- Builder: Newport News Shipbuilding and Drydock Company, Newport News, Virginia
- Laid down: 1920
- Launched: 11 December 1920
- Acquired: July 1940
- Commissioned: 3 January 1942
- Decommissioned: 19 April 1946
- Stricken: 5 June 1946
- Nickname(s): "The Mighty Z"
- Fate: Scrapped

General characteristics
- Class & type: Harris-class attack transport
- Displacement: 21,350 long tons (21,693 t)
- Length: 535 ft 2 in (163.12 m)
- Beam: 72 ft 6 in (22.10 m)
- Draft: 31 ft 3 in (9.53 m) (mean)
- Propulsion: 8 Yarrow header-type boilers; 2 Curtis type turbines; 2 shafts; 12,000 shp (8,948 kW)
- Speed: 17.5 knots (32.4 km/h; 20.1 mph)
- Capacity: 190,000 cu. ft., 2,000 t
- Troops: 121 Officers and 1558 Enlisted
- Complement: 29 Officers, 638 Enlisted
- Armament: 4 × 3"/50 caliber guns; 1 × quad 1.1"/75 caliber gun; 1 × twin 40 mm gun mount; 10 × twin 20 mm gun mounts

USS Zeilin (APA-3) was an Emergency Fleet Corporation Design 1029 ship launched for the United States Shipping Board (USSB) on 19 March 1921 by Newport News Shipbuilding and Drydock Company in Newport News, Virginia as Silver State. After operation by commercial lines for the USSB, during which the ship was renamed President Jackson, the ship was purchased and operated commercially until laid up in the late 1930s.

During World War II, the U.S. Navy acquired the ship in July 1940 and classified the ship as a transport, hull number AP-9. On 3 January 1942 the ship was commissioned USS Zeilin. On 26 November 1942 Zeilin was reclassified to Harris-class attack transport, hull number APA-3. Zeilin served throughout the war and was decommissioned on 19 April 1946 at Portsmouth, Virginia. The ship was delivered for scrapping on 4 May 1948.

== Construction ==
The Silver State was constructed by the Newport News Shipbuilding and Drydock Company in Newport News, Virginia for delivery to the United States Shipping Board as an Emergency Fleet Corporation Design 1029 combination passenger and cargo ship. The design was a modification of a World War I troop transport design upon the end of the war. Commercially the ships were known as "535's" due to their length overall of 535 ft (163 m).

The ship had accommodations for 280 first class passengers and 194 third class.

== History ==
=== Commercial Service ===
Silver State operated between Seattle, Washington, and the Far East with the Admiral Orient Line a subsidiary of the Pacific Mail Steamship Company. On 23 June 1922 the SS Silver State was renamed the SS President Jackson when the ship was purchased by the Dollar Line owned by Robert Dollar. In 1938 the SS President Jackson was transferred to the American President Lines.

Starting in 1937, the U.S. Navy studied converting the Dollar Line 535-foot (163 m) class ships to troop transports.

=== Commissioning ===
The SS President Jackson was acquired by the United States Navy in July 1940 and was renamed the Zeilin with the designation AP-9 after Brigadier General Jacob Zeilin (16 July 1806–18 November 1880) who was the first United States Marine Corps general.

The Todd Pacific Shipyards in Seattle, Washington, reconfigured the Zeilin as a troop transport. Commissioning occurred on 3 January 1942.

=== World War II ===
After a shakedown cruise and training along the west coast of the United States, the Zeilin left San Diego on 13 April 1942 transporting troops to Samoa for garrison duty and returning to San Diego on 17 June.

==== South Pacific Force and Guadalcanal ====
On 8 July 1942, Zeilin again departed San Diego and traveled via Pearl Harbor to Suva in Fiji. At Suva, Zeilin prepared for the invasion of the Solomon Islands. Zeilin was flagship of Transport Division Two (Note: Other ships of the division were: Crescent City (AP-40), President Hayes (AP-39), President Adams (AP-38), President Jackson (AP-37), Alhena (AK-26) and Betelgeuse (AK-28).) with the Amphibious Force, South Pacific Force under Rear Admiral Kelly Turner designated Task Force 62, re-designated from Task Group 61.2 under Operation Order 1—42 of 28 July issued by Vice Admiral Frank Jack Fletcher. Zeilin, with Betelgeuse part of Transport Division Two, was ordered to sail on or about 20 July 1942 for the South Pacific.

Early on the morning of 7 August 1942 Zeilin arrived off Guadalcanal with Task Force 62. On 8 August Marines from the 3rd Defense Battalion were landed by Zeilin on Tulagi, Gavutu, and Tanambogo. After completing disembarkation of the Marines, Zeilin traveled to Nouméa, New Caledonia.

For the next two months, Zeilin traveled a route between Nouméa; Espiritu Santo, New Hebrides, and Wellington, New Zealand. On 9 October, Zeilin departed Nouméa to carry troops and supplies to the Solomon Islands.

Arriving off Guadalcanal on 11 October, Zeilin began unloading at Lunga Point. On 13 October, Zeilin was attacked by a Japanese shore battery; but the ship did not receive any damage. Zeilin returned to Nouméa on 17 October and then proceeded to Espiritu Santo before returning to Lunga Point on 11 November.

At 09:00, the task group received a report that nine carrier bombers and 12 fighters were approaching from the northwest and would reach their vicinity at about 09:30. At about 09:20, Atlanta (CL-51) led the Zeilin and two other auxiliaries to the north, in column, with destroyers spaced in a circle around them. Fifteen minutes later, nine Japanese Aichi D3A "Val" dive bombers from the Hiyō emerged from the clouds over Henderson Field.

At 09:40 the Zeilin opened fire. The Japanese airplanes dove on the Zeilin and released bombs at 1,200 feet (370 m). One aircraft was set on fire by Zeilin's guns There were three near misses registered on the ship; two on the port side - one about amidships, the other aft; and one on the starboard side at about frame 45 opposite No. 8 hatch, depth about 15–30 feet. The ship suffered severely from this bomb. The number 8 hold was flooded to the third deck; number 7 to the fourth deck. The starboard shaft was carried away. Zeilin took on approximately 2,000 tons of water. Examination by diver later disclosed cracked and ruptured hull plating as the cause of the flooding.

A second attack at 10:55 by 27 Mitsubishi G3M bombers was repulsed with anti-aircraft fire and fighter aircraft from Henderson Field.

Though damaged and listing, Zeilin carried casualties to Espiritu Santo and then sailed via Tutuila, Samoa to San Pedro, California. Zeilin arrived at the Terminal Island Naval Shipyard (later known as the Long Beach Naval Shipyard) on 22 December 1942 for repair. This repair work was completed in March 1943.

==== Aleutian Islands ====
On 17 April 1943, Zeilin left San Diego, California, for the Aleutian Islands. After a six-day stop in San Francisco, California, Zeilin continued on and arrived at Cold Bay, Alaska on 1 May. Cold Bay was the rendezvous point for the Attu Island invasion force. By 11 May the Zeilin was located off the south coast of Attu Island, at Massacre Bay. After the initial landings, Zeilin remained off Attu Island until 16 May. On 17 May, Zeilin stopped at Adak, Alaska, before leaving on 22 May and arriving at San Diego, California, on 31 May.

On 15 June 1943 Zeilin was designated as relief flagship, the battleship Pennsylvania being the flagship, for Commander Amphibious Force, Pacific Fleet. In June and July 1943, Zeilin operated along the west coast of the United States before returning to Adak on 5 August to participate in the invasion of Kiska, Alaska. Zeilin left Adak on 26 August, arriving at San Diego, California on 2 September.

==== Tarawa ====
The Zeilin traveled to Pearl Harbor, Hawaii, in mid-September 1943. After a five-day stay at Pearl Harbor Zeilin continued to Wellington, New Zealand, via Funafuti and Espiritu Santo arriving on 17 October. The ship remained at Wellington before departing on 1 November and proceeding to Efate in the Vanuatu where the attack force concentrated and practiced for the invasion of Tarawa.

On 13 November, Zeilin departed Efate and arrived off Betio on 19 November. Early the following morning, Marines from 2nd Battalion 2nd Marines were offloaded into landing craft from Zeilin for their assault. During the unloading operation Zeilin was under fire from Japanese shore guns. The ship did not sustain any damage from the attack. During this operation, Commander Thomas Benjamin Fitzpatrick was in command of the ship.

==== Kwajalein Atoll ====
Zeilin returned to Pearl Harbor at the beginning of December 1943 to reload for the Marshall Islands operation leaving on 22 January 1944 with the Southern Attack Force. Zeilin arrived at Kwajalein Atoll on 31 January. Unloading elements of the Army's 7th Infantry Division, Zeilin departed on 2 February arriving at Funafuti, on 8 February.

==== Southwest Pacific and the Solomon Islands ====
For the next three months, Zeilin carried troops and supplies for units operating in the Solomon Islands and in New Guinea. During this time period Zeilin visited Guadalcanal and Bougainville in the Solomon Islands, Espiritu Santo, Milne Bay and Cape Sudest on New Guinea, and the newly conquered Admiralty Islands. On 10 May 1944, Zeilin returned to Guadalcanal to prepare for the invasion of the Mariana Islands.

==== Mariana Islands ====
Task Force 53, including Zeilin, departed the Solomon Islands on 4 June carrying Marines of the 1st Provisional Marine Brigade. Zeilin initially waited east of Guam during the Battle of the Philippine Sea. Later the Marines on Zeilin functioned as a floating reserve. Leaving the Marianas Islands on 30 June, Zeilin arrived at the Eniwetok Atoll in the Marshall Islands on 3 July. After 15 days, Zeilin left Eniwetok and joined other transports carrying troops from Hawaii. Zeilin arrived off Guam on 22 July and unloaded the Marines over four days departing on 26 July.

Zeilin stopped overnight at Eniwetok again on 29 July before arriving at Pearl Harbor on 7 August. Then after three days, Zeilin departed for the west coast of the United States arriving at San Francisco, California for a three-month overhaul.

==== Southwest Pacific ====
On 21 October 1944, Zeilin departed San Francisco arriving at Finschhafen on the west coast of New Guinea on 6 November. Zeilin visited Langemak Bay and Hollandia (now known as Jayapura) before arriving at Nouméa on 22 November.

==== Philippine Islands ====
Zeilin loaded elements of the Army's 25th Infantry Division at Nouméa and departed for Guadalcanal in the Solomon Islands in December 1944. At Guadalcanal, the task group including the Zeilin conducted training exercises. The task group left Guadalcanal on 25 December arriving at Manus in the Admiralty Islands on 29 December.

On 2 January 1945, Zeilin left Manus and arrived off San Fabian, Luzon, in the Philippine Islands on 11 January. After offloading Zeilin departed on 12 January in convoy. The next morning, a single Japanese kamikaze aircraft attacked the convoy missing the amphibious command ship Mount Olympus (AGC-8) and striking Zeilin. The right wing of the Japanese aircraft struck cargo loading equipment next to the number 6 cargo hatch. The fuselage crashed into the starboard side of the housetop. Incendiary weapons carried by the aircraft exploded and started several fires on the ship. Topside damage to the Zeilin was extensive. The superstructure deck was destroyed, deck framing was damaged, and several staterooms were destroyed. The aircraft's engine pierced the deck, the outboard bulkhead and landed in a landing craft carried by the Zeilin. Seven crew members were killed, three crew members were declared missing, and 30 crew members were injured. After the attack Zeilin continued with the convoy and arrived at Leyte island in the Philippines. After receiving temporary repairs at Leyte, Zeilin departed on 16 February arriving at Ulithi Atoll in the Caroline Islands on 18 February.

==== Iwo Jima ====
Zeilin traveled to Iwo Jima Island arriving on 9 March with reinforcements. On 16 March Zeilin departed Iwo Jima arriving at Pearl Harbor on 12 April. Zeilin left Pearl on 17 April and arrived in San Francisco, California, on 23 April.

==== Ulithi ====
Following two months of repairs in San Francisco, Zeilin departed on 30 June 1945 arriving at San Diego, California on 1 July. On 8 July, Zeilin departed San Diego for Seattle, Washington. Departing from Seattle on 23 July, Zeilin arrived at Eniwetok Atoll on 4 August. Zeilin stayed until 7 August before moving on to Ulithi Atoll.

=== Post World War II Service ===
==== Philippine Islands and Korea ====
After hostilities ceased on 15 August 1945 Zeilin departed Ulithi Atoll on 17 August arriving at Okinawa Island on 21 August. Zeilin left Okinawa on 29 August bound for Leyte. During September, Zeilin transported cargo and passengers within the Philippine Islands. In October, Zeilin was tasked to carry the Army's 106th Regimental Combat Team to occupation duty at Jinsen, Korea.

==== West Coast ====
Departing from Jinsen, Zeilin made stops at Ulithi and Guam before arriving at San Francisco on 14 November. For the remainder of 1945 and through January 1946, Zeilin traveled between San Diego, San Francisco, San Pedro, Bremerton, Washington, and Seattle.

=== Decommissioning ===
On 4 February 1946, Zeilin departed San Pedro and transited the Panama Canal on 14 February before arriving on 21 February at Hampton Roads, Virginia. Zeilin was decommissioned at Portsmouth, Virginia, on 19 April 1946.

=== Disposal ===
Zeilin was struck from the Navy List on 5 June 1946. Zeilin was transferred to the United States Maritime Commission on 3 July 1946 for disposal. On 4 May 1948 she was delivered to American Shipbreaker, Inc., for scrapping.

== Awards ==
- Zeilin earned eight battle stars for her World War II service.

== Bibliography ==
- Dyer, George Carroll (1972). The Amphibians Came to Conquer: The Story of Admiral Richmond Kelly Turner (PDF). Fleet Marine Force Reference Publication (FMFRP 12-109-11). Vol. 1. Washington: Department of the Navy. LCCN 71603853.
- Dyer, George Carroll (1972). The Amphibians Came to Conquer: The Story of Admiral Richmond Kelly Turner (PDF). Fleet Marine Force Reference Publication (FMFRP 12-109-11). Vol. 2. Washington: Department of the Navy. LCCN 71603853.
- Marine Review (1921). "1920 Construction Record of U.S. Yards". The Marine Review. 51 (February). New York: 99.
- McKellar, Norman L. "Steel Shipbuilding under the U. S. Shipping Board, 1917-1921, Part III, Contract Steel Ships". Steel Shipbuilding under the U. S. Shipping Board, 1917-1921. ShipScribe.
- Naval History And Heritage Command. "Zeilin". Dictionary of American Naval Fighting Ships. Naval History And Heritage Command.
- Wright, Christopher C. (1998). "Question 17/97: Screen of Convoys that Includes USS McCawley, April–May 1942". Warship International. XXXV (3). International Naval Research Organization: 307–313. ISSN 0043-0374.
