= SS Keystone State =

At least two ships have been named SS Keystone State, a nickname for the US state of Pennsylvania;

- SS Keystone State (1920), a cargo ship launched in 1920 that operated in the Pacific. The ship was later renamed SS President McKinley before being acquired by the United States Navy during World War II and renamed USS J. Franklin Bell and used as a troopship. The vessel was sold for scrap in 1948.
- SS Keystone State (T-ACS-1), the lead ship of the Keystone State-class crane ships of the United States Navy launched in 1965 and in ready reserve since 1984.
