= Pacific Marine Review =

American monthly magazine

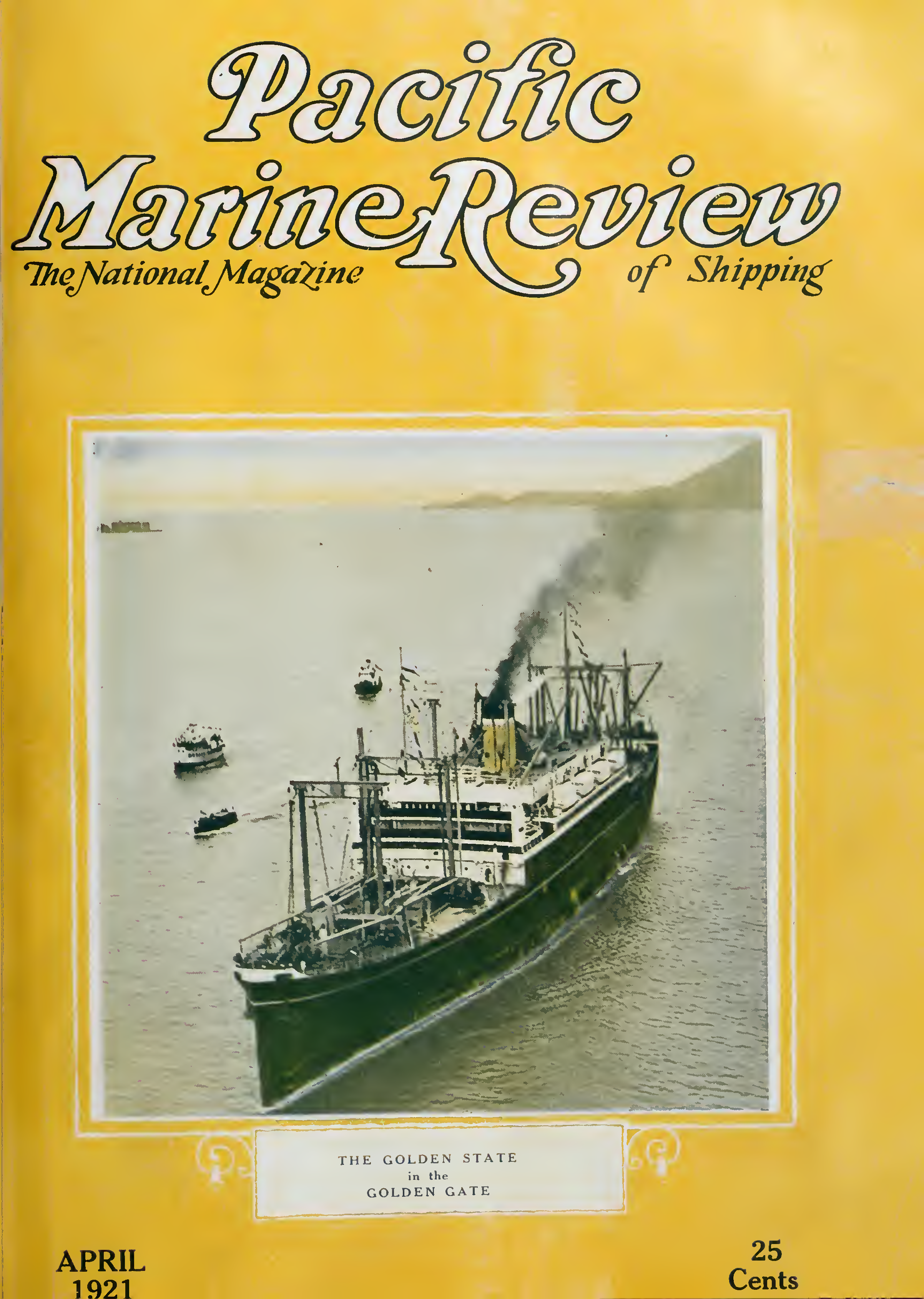
- The cover of April, 1921 issue
- Editor: H.B. Jayne (founding editor 1904–1913); then F.M. Dickie, Alexander J. Dickie, and T. Douglas MacMullen
- Frequency: monthly
- Publisher: 1904–1913 Pacific Marine Review Publishing Company, Seattle; 1913–1950 J.S. Hines, San Francisco
- Paid circulation: 4083 (1950)
- First issue: April 1, 1904; 121 years ago
- Final issue: December 10, 1950
- OCLC: 2449383

The Pacific Marine Review was an American monthly magazine dedicated to marine and shipping news that was published from 1904 to 1950. The magazine, which focused on Seattle, Portland, Tacoma, Vancouver, Victoria, San Francisco, and other ports in the North Pacific Ocean, aimed to cover marine affairs impartially, without preference for any particular port.

== History ==
The Pacific Marine Review was established in Seattle, Washington, on April 1, 1904. The magazine was published by the newly organized Pacific Marine Review Company, which was housed at 1311 Third Avenue in Seattle. At the time of the first publication, regional newspapers, including The Seattle Post-Intelligencer and The Vancouver Province, complimented the Pacific Marine Review for its illustrations, "handsome design," and quality of editing. Over the next nine years, the magazine's paid circulation grew to 1,500. In April 1913, the magazine was sold to James S. Hines, a publisher from San Francisco.

Its new home became 24 California Street. The new publisher lowered the subscription from $3 to $2 and almost doubled the magazine's paid circulation, which reached 2,255 by 1914. By 1930, the magazine's headquarters had moved to 576 Sacramento Street, and its paid circulation reached 3,473. The subscription price remained $2, and advertising rates varied from $100 to $160 per page.

By 1940, Pacific Marine Review's paid circulation decreased to 3,050, and the publisher lowered the subscription price to $1.50. By 1950, the subscription price was back at $2, and the magazine's headquarters moved again, this time to 580 Market Street. Paid circulation peaked at 4,083. The December issue of 1950 was the last in the magazine's history.

Pacific Marine Review historical covers
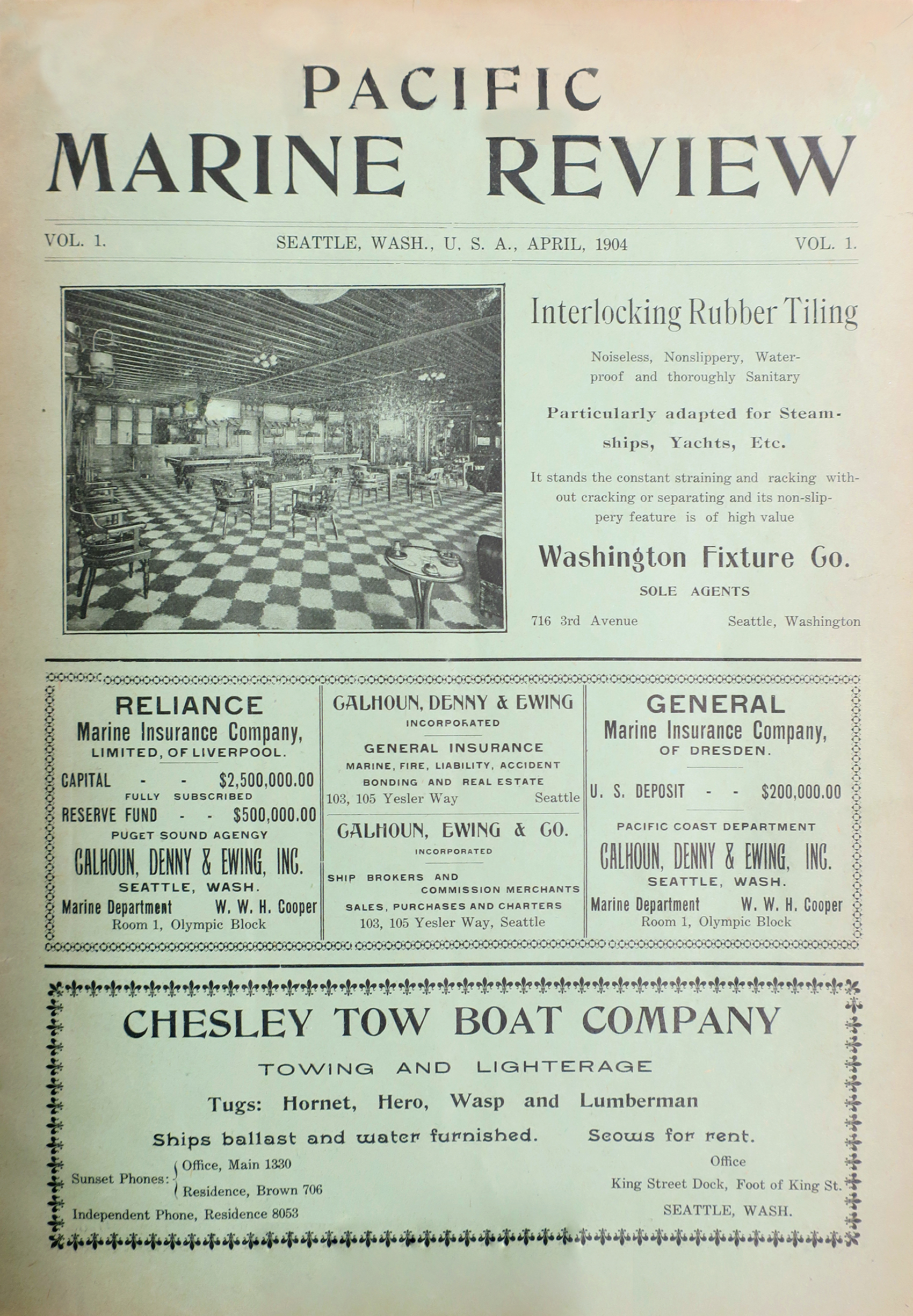
The first issue (April, 1904)

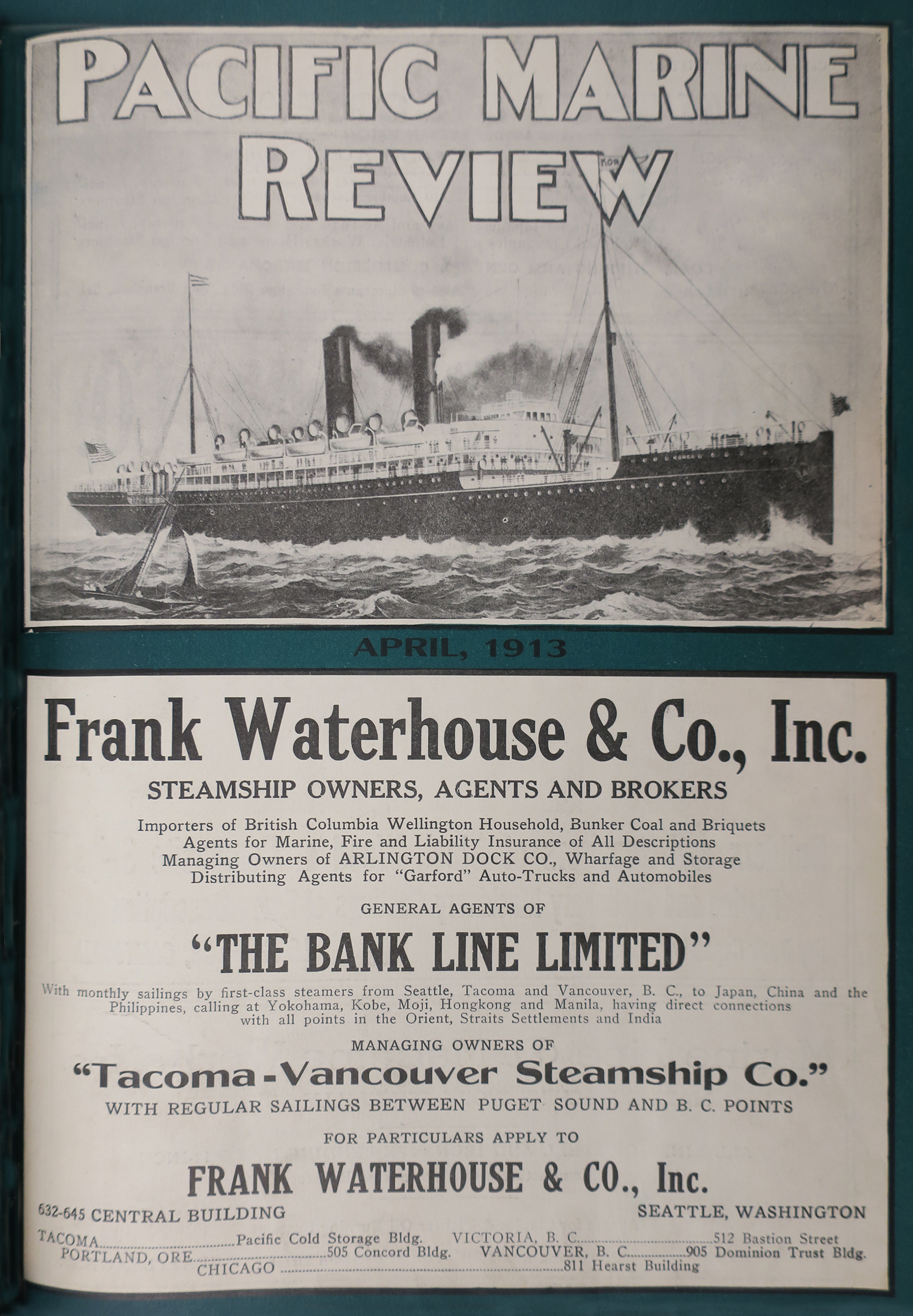
The last issue published in Seattle (April, 1913)

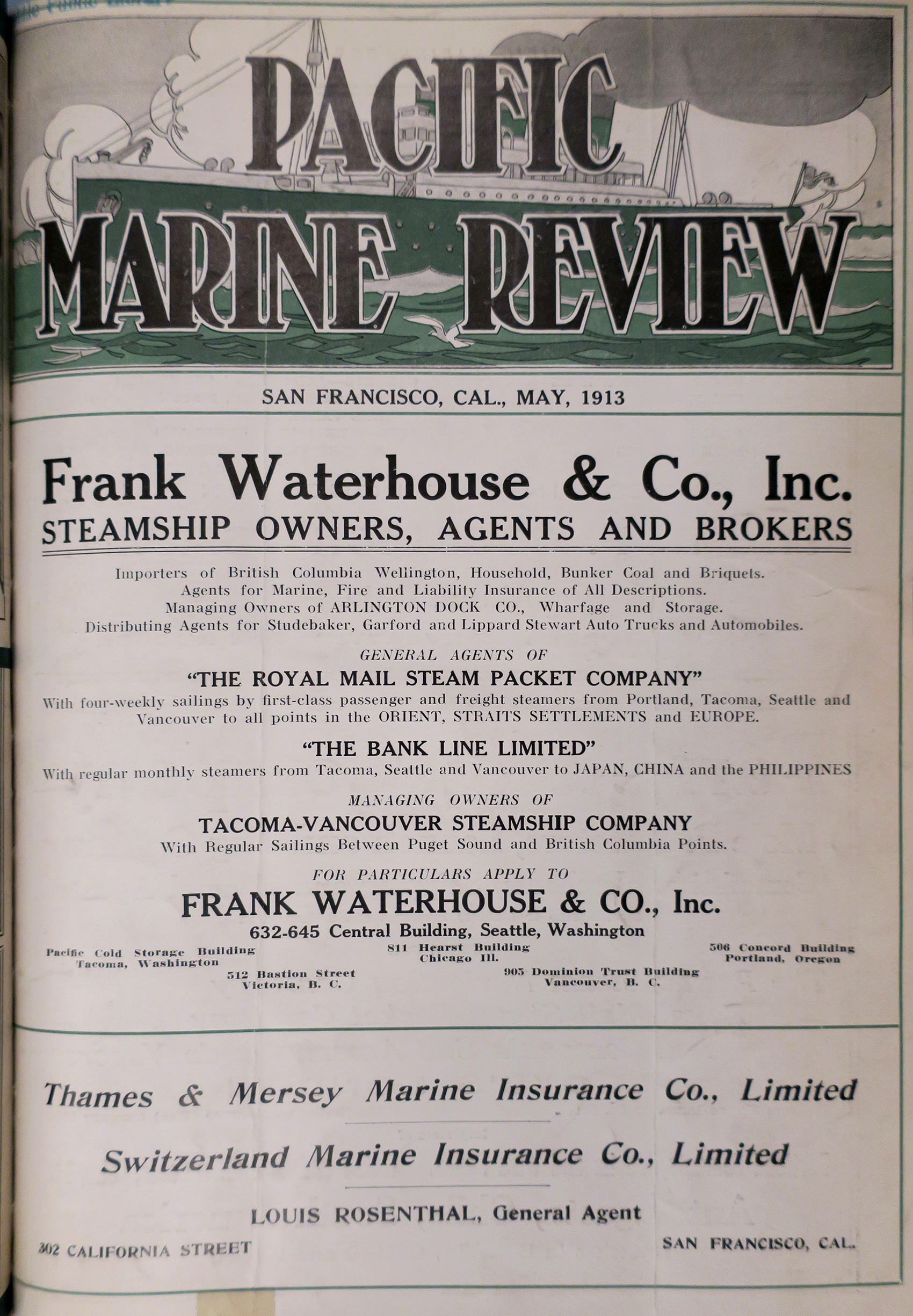
The first issue published in San Francisco (May 1913)

== See also ==
- Shipbuilding
- Marine engineering

== Literature cited ==
- Blethen, Alden J., ed. (April 3, 1904), "Side by Side: New Magazine Appears", Seattle Daily Times, Seattle: The Seattle Times Company, p. 8, ISSN 2639-4898, LCCN sn86072007, OCLC 1765328
- "New Marine Magazine", Seattle Post-Intelligencer, Seattle: Leigh S. J. Hunt, April 3, 1904, ISSN 2379-7304, LCCN sn83045604, OCLC 9563195
- "New Magazine", Vancouver Province, Vancouver: Southam Company, April 5, 1904, ISSN 0839-3311, OCLC 776052805
- "Pacific Marine Review", Tacoma Daily Ledger, Tacoma: Ledger Publishing Company, April 6, 1904, LCCN sn86072046, OCLC 14402983
- N. W. Ayer & Son's American newspaper annual, Philadelphia: N. W. Ayer & Son, 1905, LCCN sn91012091, OCLC 6039147
- N. W. Ayer & Son's American newspaper annual and directory, Philadelphia: N. W. Ayer & Son, 1912, LCCN sn91012092, OCLC 4163731
- N. W. Ayer & Son's American newspaper annual and directory, Philadelphia: N. W. Ayer & Son, 1913, LCCN sn91012092, OCLC 4163731
- N. W. Ayer & Son's American newspaper annual and directory, Philadelphia: N. W. Ayer & Son, 1914, LCCN sn91012092, OCLC 4163731
- Crain, G. D., ed. (1930), The Market data book: containing a directory of class, trade and technical publications, Chicago: G. D. Crain, LCCN 21010316, OCLC 7400259
- N. W. Ayer & Son's directory of newspapers and periodicals, Philadelphia: N. W. Ayer & Son, 1940, ISSN 2638-8308, LCCN 01031589, OCLC 5337416
- N. W. Ayer & Son's directory of newspapers and periodicals, Philadelphia: N. W. Ayer & Son, 1950, ISSN 2638-8308, LCCN 01031589, OCLC 5337416
- Mott, Frank Luther (1957), A history of American magazines: 1885–1905, vol. 4, Cambridge: Harvard University Press, LCCN 39002823, OCLC 310494337
