= Design 1029 ship =

US passenger/cargo ship design in World War I

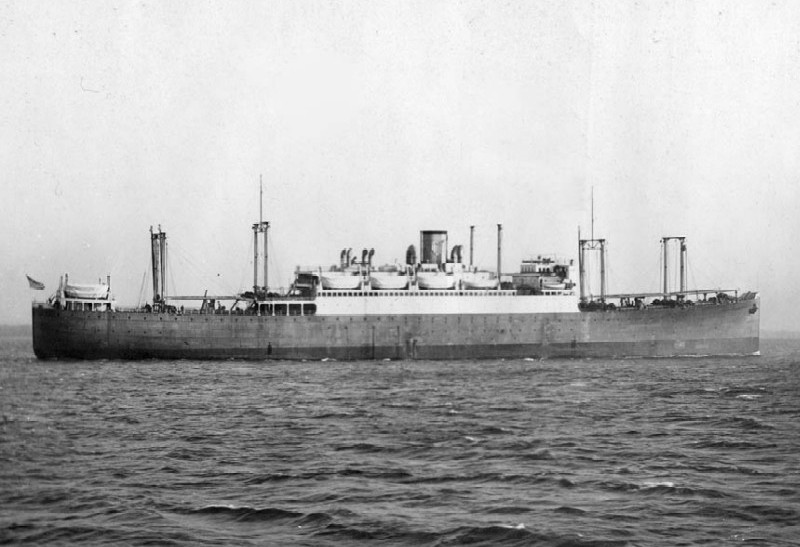
- Hawkeye State in the 1920s

Class overview
- Name: EFT Design 1029
- Builders: Bethlehem Sparrows Point; Newport News Shipbuilding; New York Shipbuilding
- Built: 1921–1922
- Planned: 16
- Completed: 11

General characteristics
- Type: Passenger / Cargo ship
- Tonnage: 13,000 dwt
- Length: 517 ft 0 in (157.58 m); 535 ft 0 in (163.07 m) o.a.
- Beam: 72 ft 0 in (21.95 m)
- Draft: 28 ft 0 in (8.53 m)
- Propulsion: Turbine, oil fuel
- Speed: 16 kn (18 mph; 30 km/h) to 17.5 kn (20.1 mph; 32.4 km/h)

The Design 1029 ship (full name Emergency Fleet Corporation Design 1029) was a steel-hulled passenger/cargo ship type designed to be converted in times of war to a troopship. The design was approved for production by the United States Shipping Board's Emergency Fleet Corporation (EFT) in World War I. The ships were referred to as the 535-type as all the ships were 535 feet in overall length. Eleven ships were built from 1921 to 1922. Three shipyards built the ships: Bethlehem Sparrows Point Shipyard of Baltimore, Maryland (5 ships); Newport News Shipbuilding & Drydock Company of Newport News, Virginia (5 ships); and New York Shipbuilding Company of Camden, New Jersey (which built the six former Design 1095 ships).

Name	Builder	Navy	Acquired	Converted at	Commissioned
American Legion	New York Shipbuilding	American Legion (AP-35)	22 Aug 1941		26 Aug 1941
Bay State
Buckeye State
Empire State
Golden State	Newport News Shipbuilding	Tasker H. Bliss (AP-42)	19 Aug 1942	Maryland DD	15 Sep 1942
Hawkeye State	Bethlehem Sparrows Point	Hugh L. Scott (AP-43)	14 Aug 1942	Todd Hoboken	7 Sep 1942
Hoosier State
Keystone State	New York Shipbuilding	J. Franklin Bell (AP-34)	26 Dec 1941		26 Dec 1941
Lone Star State
Nutmeg State	Bethlehem Sparrows Point	Leonard Wood (AP-25)	3 Jun 1941		10 June 1941
Palmetto State	Bethlehem Sparrows Point	Hunter Ligget (AP-27)	27 May 1941	Brooklyn Navy Yard	9 Jun 1941
Peninsula State	New York Shipbuilding	Joseph T. Dickman (AP-26)	27 May 1941	Brooklyn Navy Yard	10 June 1941
Pine Tree State	Bethlehem Sparrows Point	Harris (AP-8)	17 Jul 1940	Todd Seattle	19 Aug 1940
Silver State	Newport News Shipbuilding	Zeilin (AP-9)	17 Jul 1940	Todd Seattle	19 Aug 1940
Southern Cross	New York Shipbuilding	Wharton (AP-7)	8 Nov 1939	Todd Brooklyn	14 Dec 1939
Wenatchee	New York Shipbuilding	Henry T. Allen (AP-30)	6 May 1941	Moore Dry Dock	6 Dec 1941

== Bibliography ==
- McKellar, Norman L. "Steel Shipbuilding under the U. S. Shipping Board, 1917-1921, Part III, Contract Steel Ships" (PDF). Steel Shipbuilding under the U. S. Shipping Board, 1917-1921. ShipScribe.
