= USS Refuge =

Hospital ship of the United States Navy

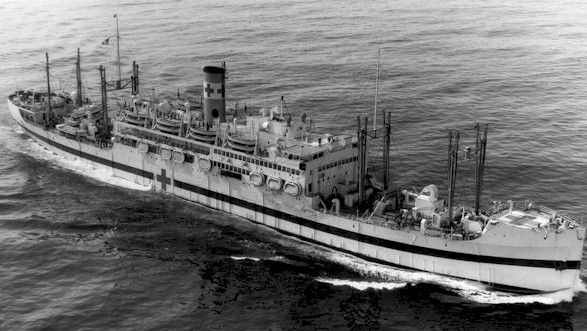
- USS Refuge

History

United States
- Name: 1921–1922: Blue Hen State; 1922–1940: President Garfield; 1940–1942: President Madison; 1942–1944: Kenmore; 1944–1948: Refuge
- Operator: American President Lines
- Builder: New York Shipbuilding, Camden, New Jersey
- Cost: $4,088,274.71
- Yard number: hull 250
- Launched: 23 February 1921 as Blue Hen State
- Completed: June 1921
- Fate: Sold for scrap 2 February 1948

United States
- Name: USS Kenmore (AP-62)
- Acquired: 11 April 1942
- Commissioned: 5 August 1942
- Decommissioned: 16 September 1943
- Fate: Converted to hospital ship

United States
- Name: USS Refuge (AH-11)
- Commissioned: 24 February 1944
- Decommissioned: 2 April 1946
- Stricken: 8 May 1946
- Honours and awards: 1 battle star (WWII)
- Fate: Sold for scrap, 2 February 1948

General characteristics
- Type: Design 1095 ship known commercially as "502" Type
- Tonnage: 10,501 GRT
- Displacement: 16,800 long tons (17,070 t)
- Length: 502 ft 1 in (153.0 m) LBP; 522 ft 8 in (159.3 m) LOA
- Beam: 62 ft (18.9 m)
- Draft: 26 ft (7.9 m) (limiting)
- Propulsion: Reciprocating Engines, Twin Screw
- Speed: 11.5 knots (21.3 km/h; 13.2 mph)
- Capacity: 626 patients
- Complement: (Navy) 543 officers and enlisted
- Armament: None

USS Refuge (AH-11), was a hospital ship of the United States Navy during World War II. The ship was built in 1921 by the New York Shipbuilding Corp., of Camden, New Jersey, as SS Blue Hen State, but was renamed President Garfield in 1923 and then SS President Madison in 1940 for service with American President Lines. Acquired by the Navy from the War Shipping Administration on 11 April 1942 the ship was commissioned as the transport USS Kenmore until conversion to a hospital ship.

== Construction ==
Blue Hen State was an Emergency Fleet Corporation Design 1095 passenger/cargo design more frequently known in the industry as the "502" type for the design length of 502 feet (153.0 m) between perpendiculars. The design had been for troop transports until signing of the armistice ending World War I made completion as civilian passenger and cargo ships desirable. New York Shipbuilding had the contract for all seven of the "502" class and nine of the "535" class, an order requiring expansion and construction of the company's South Yard, that were to be delivered to the United States Shipping Board (USSB).

The design specifications for the seven ships were for 12,000 DWT combined passenger and cargo ships with elaborate accommodations for 78 passengers served by a crew of 115 and a bale cargo capacity of 465,940 cubic feet (13,194.0 m^{3}) of which 52,300 cubic feet (1,481.0 m^{3}) was cargo cold storage. Blue Hen State, along with Centennial State, was modified during completion to carry several hundred steerage passengers.

== Merchant service ==
Blue Hen State, named after a nickname for Delaware, was renamed President Garfield by the USSB in 1922 in a mass renaming of the previously "State"-named ships. She was transferred to Dollar Line in 1923. On 26 August 1925, she ran aground at Nantucket, Massachusetts, but was refloated the next day.

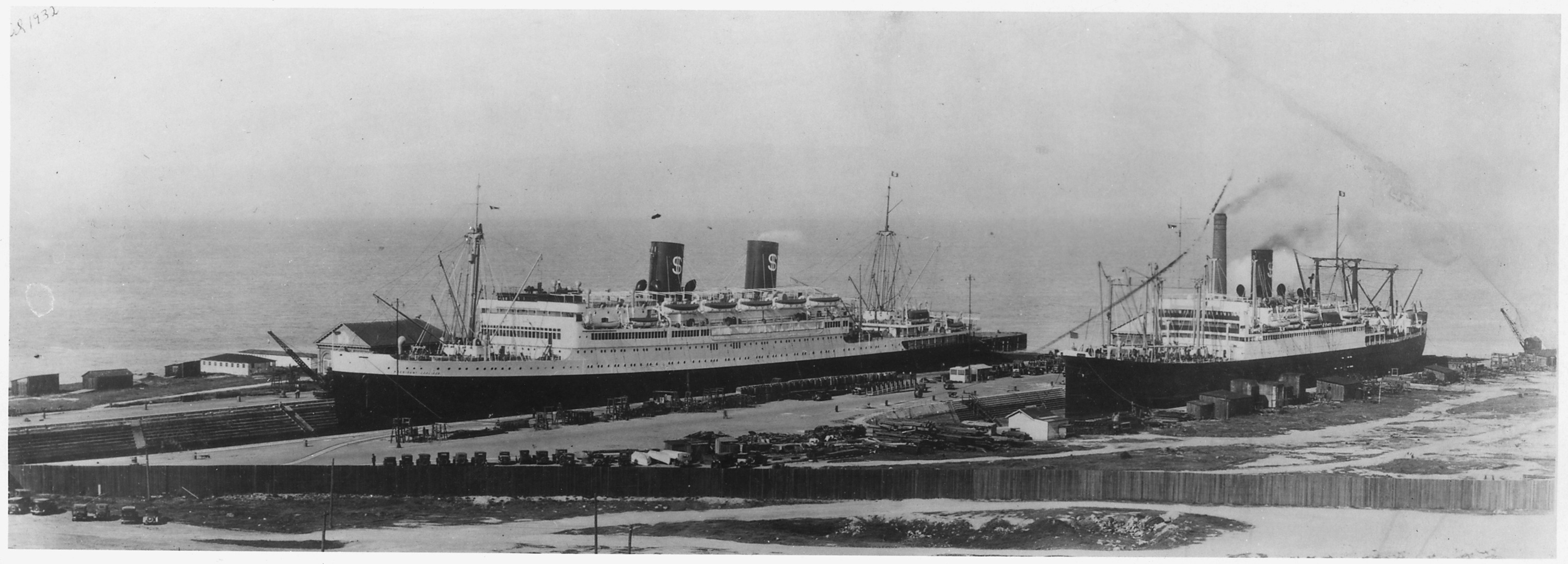
Dollar Line ship SS President Garfield in the Hunters' Point Dry Dock, San Francisco, California in 1932

President Garfield was sold in 1926 to Dollar Line. On 1 June 1928, she rammed the American cargo ship SS Kershaw in the Atlantic Ocean off Martha's Vineyard, Massachusetts. Kershaw sank with the loss of seven crew members. President Garfield rescued 30 survivors from Kershaw.

On 20 January 1929, President Garfield ran aground on Matanilla Reef in the Bahamas. Her passengers were taken off by the American passenger ship SS Pan America. She was refloated on 23 January.

President Garfield was transferred from Dollar Line to American President Lines in 1938 and renamed President Madison in 1940.

President Madison was delivered to the United States Government for World War II service at Boston on 6 September 1941 in a precursor of the procedure later followed by ships delivered to the War Shipping Administration (established 7 February 1942) and was operated by American President Lines as agent.

== World War II ==
President Madison had just sailed from Manila when war came to the Pacific arriving at the blacked out Surabaya unaware of the war with lights lit and a big United States flag visible as they passed Japanese fishing boats. On being told to turn off lights and of war both passengers and crew began painting the ship grey and the carpenter fabricated an imitation wooden gun in hopes of keeping submarines from surfacing and being able to outrun the ship on its voyage to New York. The ship was dubbed the Phantom Ship, for dodging submarines while fleeing the Japanese under strict radio silence and presumed sunk to arrive safely in New York 92 days later.

President Madison was purchased by the Navy at Baltimore on 11 April 1942. The ship was converted to a troop transport, renamed, classified as a transport with hull number AP-62 and commissioned on 5 August 1942 as USS Kenmore at Baltimore, Maryland.

=== Commissioned as USS Kenmore (AP-62) ===
Following shakedown in Chesapeake Bay, Kenmore put in at Norfolk, Virginia, on 6 September and embarked men and equipment of the 13th Marine Defense Battalion and the 18th and 19th Naval Construction Battalions. Departing on 19 September, she docked at Guantánamo Bay, Cuba, on 24 September and steamed in convoy for the Pacific on 4 October transporting the Marine Corps' 9th Defense Battalion. Arriving off Nouméa, New Caledonia, on 11 November, she debarked her troops and offloaded her cargo, then reported on 9 November to Rear Adm. Richmond K. Turner, Commander, Amphibious Forces, South Pacific.

Kenmore departed Nouméa on 28 November as a unit of Task Force 62, arriving off the beach east of Togoma Point, Guadalcanal, on 3 December. There she offloaded troops and cargo for two days, thence returned to Nouméa on 11 December. She next steamed unescorted to San Francisco, arriving on 5 January 1943 for an overhaul at General Engineering & Drydock Company.

From 8 February until 27 May, Kenmore transported troops and cargo between San Francisco and the Hawaiian Islands. Departing San Francisco on 13 June, she steamed for Nouméa, arriving on 6 July. A call at Tenaru Beach, Guadalcanal on 13 July was followed by a return to Nouméa on the 20th, with departure for the east coast of the United States five days later. She transited the Panama Canal on 19 August, took on passengers at Cristóbal, and steamed via Guantanamo for Norfolk, Virginia, arriving there on 2 September. She then decommissioned at Baltimore, Maryland, on 16 September, for conversion to a hospital ship by the Maryland Drydock Company.

=== Recommissioned as USS Refuge (AH-11) ===
Renamed Refuge and redesignated AH-11, the ship recommissioned at Baltimore on 24 February 1944. After a partial fitting out at Baltimore, she steamed on 10 March to the Norfolk Navy Yard. Assigned to the Service Force, Atlantic, she commenced assisting in the transport of casualties from the war zones to the United States.

==== Atlantic service ====
Departing Hampton Roads on 20 April, Refuge embarked patients at Mers El Kébir, Algeria, from 6–8 May, and returned to Charleston, South Carolina, on 24 May. From 1 June through 29 July 1944, she made two voyages to the British Isles, embarking patients at Belfast, Northern Ireland; Liverpool, England; and Milford Haven, Wales. These patients were returned to Newport News and Norfolk, Virginia.

Sailing again for the Mediterranean on 2 August, she arrived at Oran, Algeria on the 17th, thence proceeded to the southern coast of France for operations between St. Tropez Bay and Naples, Italy. She departed Naples on 16 September with embarked patients, took on additional patients at Oran, then steamed for New York, arriving on 6 October.

==== South Pacific duty ====
After an overhaul at New York, Refuge departed on 1 November 1944 for South Pacific duty with the Service Force, 7th Fleet. After stopping at Humboldt Bay, Dutch New Guinea, on 16 December, she continued on three days later for the Philippines. Arriving San Pedro Bay, Leyte, on Christmas Eve, she commenced the embarkation of patients from small landing craft. By 30 June 1945 she had made six voyages from that area to deliver her casualties to either Hollandia, New Guinea or Seeadler Harbor, Manus, the Admiralties. She departed Seeadler Harbor on 1 July for Manila, where she received patients from various fleet units through to the end of August 1945.

Refuge departed Manila on 31 August for Jinsen, Korea, arriving 8 September. She sailed on the 17th, embarked evacuees at Shanghai, China, thence steamed for Okinawa, arriving 2 October. She then made two voyages between Okinawa and Qingdao, China through 20 October.

After embarking patients and troops for return to the United States, Refuge departed Okinawa on 22 October, took on additional patients at Saipan, and arrived in San Francisco on 18 November. An overhaul took her through 9 December, and two days later she departed for Yokosuka, Japan, arriving on 4 January 1946. After embarking Army troops for transportation to the United States, she departed on 7 January and returned to Seattle, Washington, on the 28th. USS Refuge received one battle star for World War II service.

=== Decommission ===
Refuge decommissioned at Seattle on 2 April 1946. Her name was struck from the Navy list on 8 May 1946 and she was delivered to the War Shipping Administration on 29 June 1946 and placed in the Reserve Fleet at Olympia, Washington. She was sold for scrap to Consolidated Builders on 2 February 1948.

== Bibliography ==
- "APL History" (PDF). APL (American President Lines). Archived from the original (PDF) on 10 February 2014.
- Maritime Administration. "President Madison". Ship History Database Vessel Status Card. U.S. Department of Transportation, Maritime Administration. Archived from the original on 25 July 2015.
- Marine Engineering (1920). "502-Foot Passenger and Cargo Vessels". Marine Engineering. 25 (April). New York: Aldrich Publishing Company: 265–269.
- McKellar, Norman L. "Steel Shipbuilding under the U. S. Shipping Board, 1917–1921, Part V, Contract Steel Ships". Steel Shipbuilding under the U. S. Shipping Board, 1917–1921. ShipScribe.
- Naval History And Heritage Command. "Refuge". Dictionary of American Naval Fighting Ships. Naval History And Heritage Command.
- "The New York Shipbuilding Corporation". Pacific Marine Review. 18 (April). San Francisco: J.S. Hines: 201–204. 1921.
- "Cost of U.S.S.B. Vessels". Pacific Marine Review. 19 (July). San Francisco: J.S. Hines: 434. 1922.
- Villard, Harold G., ed. (1921). "Launching of the Blue Hen State". The Nautical Gazette. 100 (5 March 1921). New York: The Nautical Gazette, Inc.: 314.
