= Harris-class attack transport =

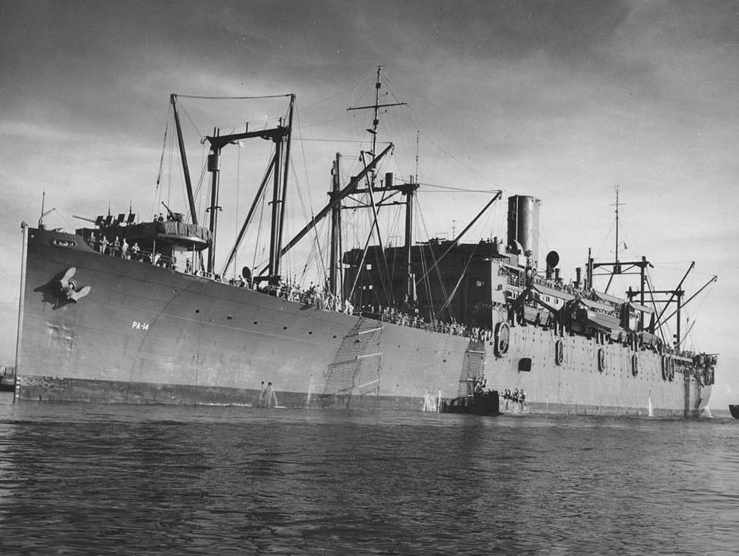
- USS Hunter Liggett (APA-14), a ship of the Harris class

Class overview
- Name: Harris class
- Builders: New York Shipbuilding (x4); Bethlehem Steel (x3); Newport News Shipbuilding (x1)
- Operators: United States Navy
- Succeeded by: McCawley class
- Built: 1919-1922
- In service: Commercial: 1926-1937
- In commission: Army: 1939-1941; Navy: 1941-1946
- Completed: 8 (acquired)
- Retired: 8

General characteristics
- Class & type: Harris-class attack transport
- Displacement: 13,529 tons (lt), 21,900 t.(fl)
- Length: 535 ft 2 in (163.12 m)
- Beam: 72 ft 4 in (22.05 m)
- Draft: 31 ft 3 in (9.53 m)
- Propulsion: 2 × turbines, 8 × boilers, 2 × propeller, designed shaft horsepower 10,000 -12,000
- Speed: 17 - 18 knots
- Capacity: Troops: 95-126 officers, 1,417-1,961 enlisted; Cargo: 120,000-409,400 cu ft, 1,700-2,600 tons
- Complement: 29-67 officers, 585-673 enlisted
- Armament: 4 × 3"/50 caliber dual-purpose guns, 1-2 × twin 40mm guns, 0-2 × quad 1.1"/75 caliber guns, 10-18 × single 20mm guns.

The Harris-class attack transport was a class of US Navy attack transport which saw service in World War II. The purpose of any attack transport was to deliver troops and their equipment to hostile shores in order to execute amphibious invasions using an array of smaller integral landing craft. Being intended to serve in forward combat areas, these ships were well armed with antiaircraft guns to protect itself and its vulnerable cargo of troops from air attack in the battle zone.

== Background ==
The Harris class is amongst the few classes of attack transport that were converted from pre-war tonnage rather than built from either Maritime Commission or Victory ship hull types during the war. It also holds the distinction of being the first group of ships commissioned into the US Navy which would eventually serve as attack transports.

The origins of the Harris class go back to America's entry into World War I. At that time, the US Shipping Board was set up to modernize America's merchant cargo fleet, and to provide ships suitable for service as naval auxiliaries. During this period, the Shipping Board contracted with several firms, including New York Shipbuilding and Bethlehem Steel, for the building of a class of large ships to be used as troop transports. The ships were known simply as the "535 class" after their length in feet.

Although they arrived too late to see service in the First World War, sixteen were duly completed between 1919 and 1922, and since the Navy no longer had use for them, they were all eventually sold or contracted out to private companies, most notably Dollar Lines (hence the class' alternative name, the Dollar class). For their new role the vessels were converted to passenger-cargo ships, serving mostly on routes between the United States and South America, and until the 1930s, were amongst America's fastest and best passenger liners.

In 1937, with another major war looming on the horizon, the US Government began to consider the possibility of reacquiring the 535' class for their originally intended role as troop transports, and when war broke out in Europe in 1939, it was decided to go ahead with the acquisition. Accordingly, a dozen of the Dollar class vessels were purchased by the War Department and converted into troop transports for service with the US Army, which named most of them after distinguished Army leaders.

The ships were all eventually handed over to the US Navy, but two of them, Tasker H. Bliss and Hugh L. Scott were sunk by enemy action not long after America's entry into the war, while another, Willard A. Holbrook, was acquired but never commissioned. The remaining eight then took the name of the earliest surviving ship commissioned, USS Harris, and thus they became the Harris class. The Navy chose not to rename the individual ships, so they retained their former Army names. In February 1943, all the ships of the class were redesignated as attack transports.

== Description ==
The Harris class had almost twice the displacement of most its sister attack transport classes whilst retaining about the same speed of 17-18 knots. The ships could consequently carry a large number of troops - between about 1,500 and 2,000 (and it seems, in more comfortable conditions than those that prevailed for the other APA classes). They could also carry a moderate amount of cargo.

Their main armament consisted of four 3"/50 caliber guns, supported by one or two twin 40mm cannon and a variable number of 20mm weapons. Some of the ships also had one or two quad-mounted 1.1"/75 caliber guns.

Later classes of attack transport were to receive heavier armament as the 20mm weapon in particular was to prove of limited effectiveness at combating Japanese kamikaze tactics.

== Service ==
Commissioned relatively early in the war, the Harris class ships saw action in all the major theatres of war, including the Mediterranean, Atlantic and Pacific Theatres. Ships of the class saw action in virtually every major amphibious operation of the war, including the invasions of North Africa, Sicily, Italy, Normandy and Southern France; and in the Pacific, through America's island hopping campaign, from the invasions of the Aleutians and Guadalcanal in 1942 to the final battle for Okinawa in 1945.

At the close of hostilities a number were employed in redeploying American troops for occupation duty in newly conquered Japan and its former territories in China and Korea, after which they were utilized in Operation Magic Carpet, the giant sealift organized to bring demobilizing American servicemen back to the United States.

The entire class was decommissioned shortly after the war in early 1946, and scrapped in February–March 1948.
