= List of U.S. military vessels named after living Americans =

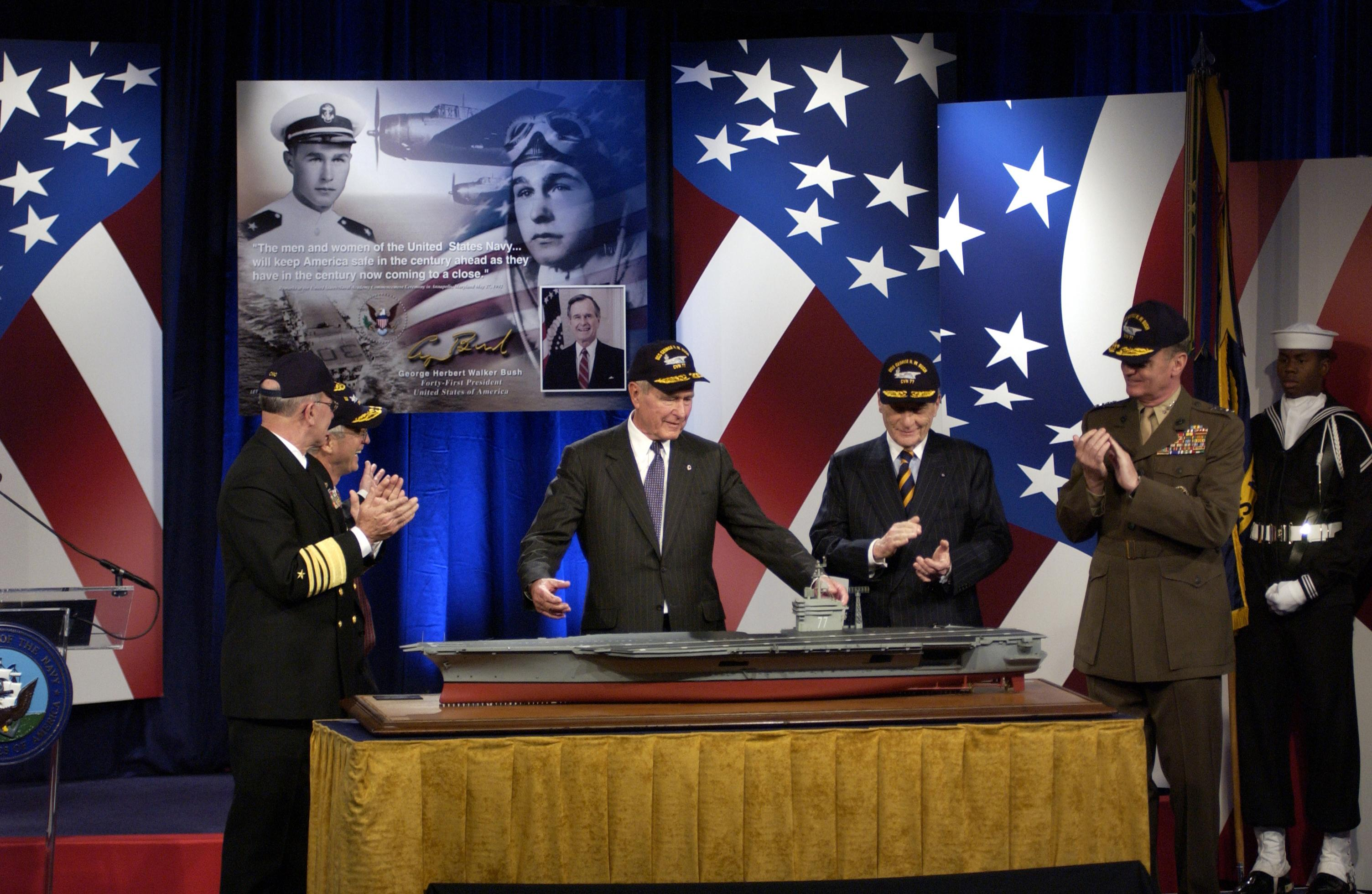
Former president George H. W. Bush views a model of USS George H.W. Bush (CVN-77), the aircraft carrier named after him.

The naming of United States Navy vessels after living people was common in the earliest years of American history, but as the 20th century began, the Navy had firmly established a practice of naming ships for people only after they had died. In 1969, a Navy panel formally decreed that warships would no longer be named after living persons.

That lasted until 1974, when President Richard Nixon announced the naming of an aircraft carrier after United States representative Carl Vinson. Over the next half-century, the Navy named more ships for living people than it had in the previous two centuries. From October 2020 to March 2023, the Navy named a ship for a living person every eight months, a pace unseen since 1776.

U.S. Navy ships are named by the secretary of the Navy under U.S. law, explicitly until 1925 and implicitly since.

No ships were named for living former Navy secretaries until 2001; since then, every Navy secretary save one has named a warship for a living predecessor, accounting for more than one-quarter of the ships they named for living people.

No one has named more U.S. ships for living people than Ray Mabus, who did so eight times during his service as secretary from 2009 to 2017. "I think it's...important, when we can, to honor people who are still with us and thank them for what they did," Mabus said in 2016.

The U.S. Navy generally announces the name of a ship some time before it is launched, and well before it is accepted for purchase and commissioned into active service.

== List of ships ==
The following ships received their names while their namesakes were alive. The list includes several ships whose namesakes died before the ships were commissioned.

=== 1770s ===
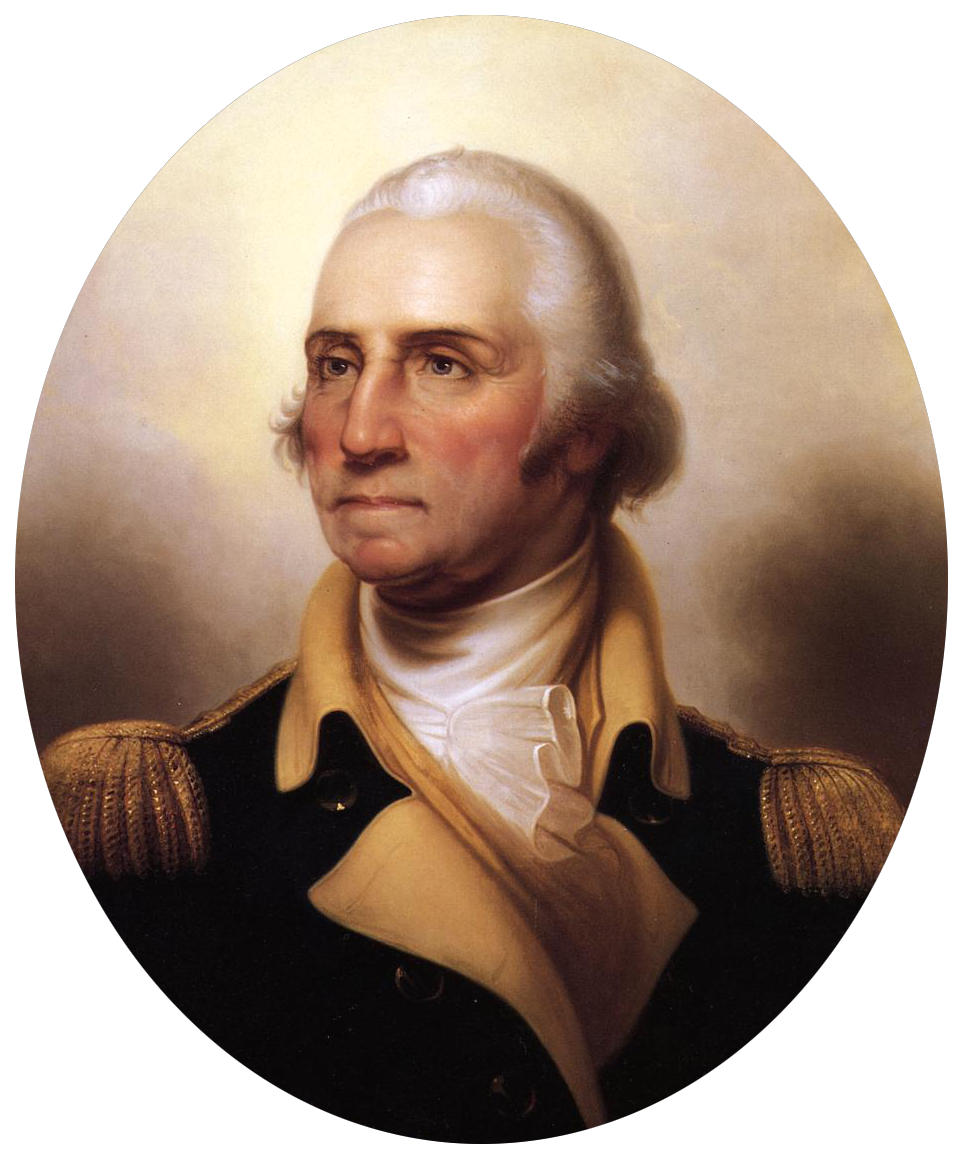
George Washington

- George Washington had several vessels named after him before he died in 1799, including at least four in the 1770s and one in 1798. (See also USS Washington).
  - USS Washington (1775) was a schooner named Endeavor acquired by Gen. Washington in October 1775, renamed Washington, and re-rigged as a brigantine.
  - USS Washington (1776 row galley) was a row galley that operated in Narragansett Bay during the winter and spring of 1776.
  - USS Washington (1776 frigate) was one of 13 frigates authorized by the Continental Congress. She was launched in August 1776.
  - USS Washington (1776 lateen-rigged galley), a lateen-rigged two-masted galley, was built in the autumn of 1776.
  - USS George Washington (1798) was commissioned in 1798.
- John Hancock's name was given to two vessels before he died in October 1793. (See also USS Hancock).
  - USS Hancock (1775) was the former schooner Speedwell, hired in October 1775.
  - USS Hancock (1776) was a sailing frigate of the American Revolutionary War, commissioned in 1776.
- USS Franklin (1775) was a 6-gun schooner, fitted out in 1775; Benjamin Franklin died in 1790. (See also USS Franklin)
- USS Lady Washington (1776) was commissioned in 1776; Martha Washington died in 1802.
- USS Deane (1778) was commissioned in 1778; Silas Deane died in 1789.

=== 1790s ===
- Two ships were named for John Adams while he was serving as America's second president:
  - USS Adams (1799), a 28-gun frigate, was launched in New York on June 8, 1799.
  - USS John Adams (1799), a 24-gun frigate, was launched in Charleston, South Carolina, on June 5, 1799.

=== 1800s ===
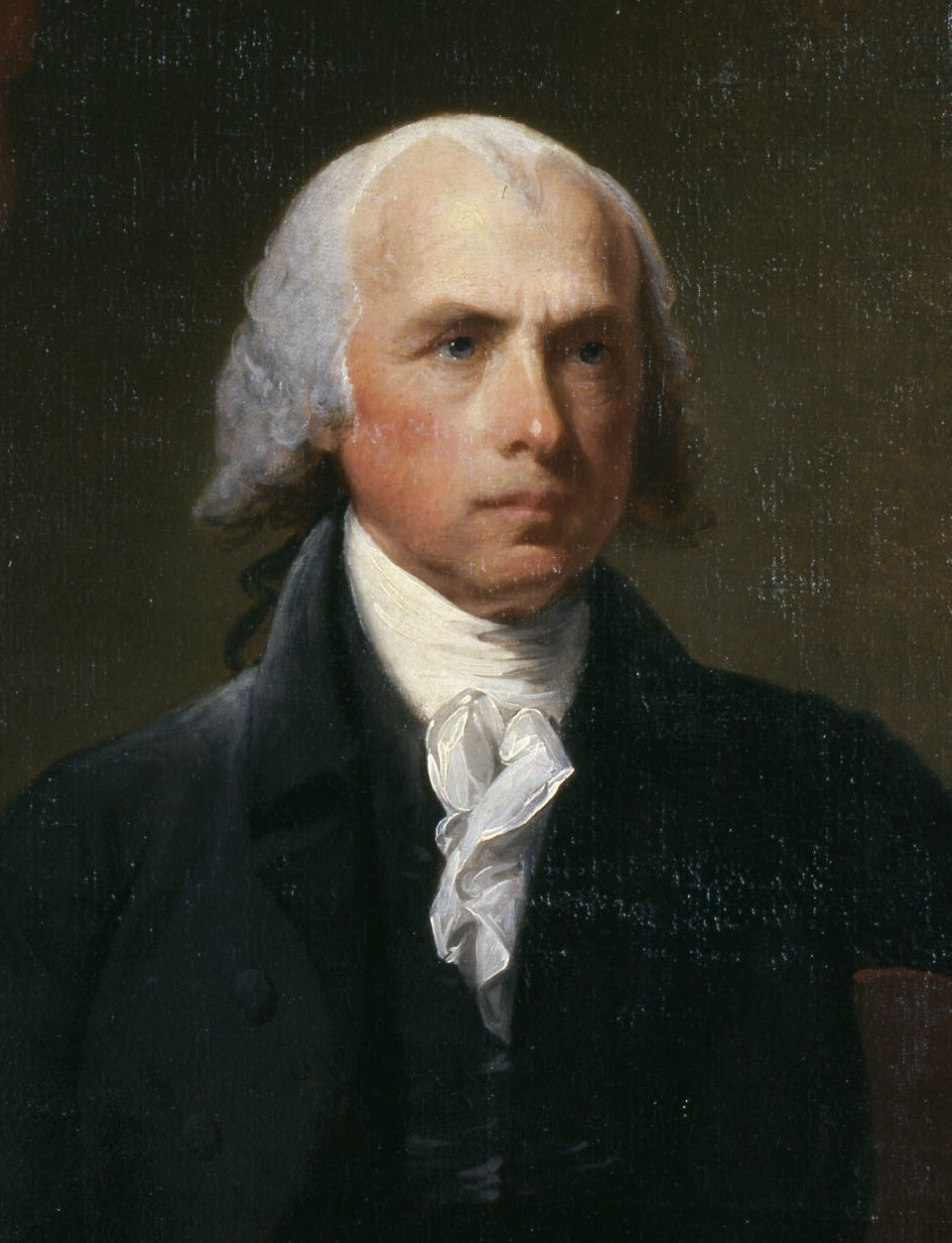
James Madison

- USS James Madison (1807) was commissioned in 1807, the first of three ships named for James Madison before he died on June 28, 1836.

=== 1810s ===
- USS Jefferson (1814) was launched in 1814; Thomas Jefferson died on July 4, 1826.

=== 1820s ===
- USS Madison (1812) was a 14-gun schooner launched in 1812.

=== 1830s ===
- USS Madison (1832) was a Van Buren-class schooner, designed by Edward Preble and built in 1832.
- USS Van Buren (1839) was commissioned in 1839; Martin Van Buren died in July 1862. (See also USS Van Buren)

=== 1850s ===
- USS Harriet Lane, commissioned by the US Revenue Cutter Service in 1857, transferred to the U.S. Navy in 1861, named for Harriet Lane, niece and First Lady of bachelor President James Buchanan. Lane died in 1903.

=== 1900s ===
- USS Holland (SS-1) was commissioned in 1900; John Philip Holland, pioneer of submarine design, died August 1914.

=== 1970s ===
- USS Carl Vinson (CVN-70) was named in 1974; Carl Vinson, former chairman of the House Armed Services Committee, died in 1981, before the ship was commissioned.

=== 1980s ===
- USS Hyman G. Rickover (SSN-709) was named in 1983; retired Admiral Hyman Rickover, known as the "Father of the Nuclear Navy", died in 1986.
- USS John C. Stennis (CVN-74) was named in 1988; John Stennis, former chairman of the Senate Armed Services Committee, died in 1995, before the ship was commissioned.
- USS Arleigh Burke (DDG-51) was named in 1989; retired Admiral Arleigh Burke, former 3-term Chief of Naval Operations, died in 1996. Burke spoke at the ship's commissioning on July 4, 1991.

=== 1990s ===
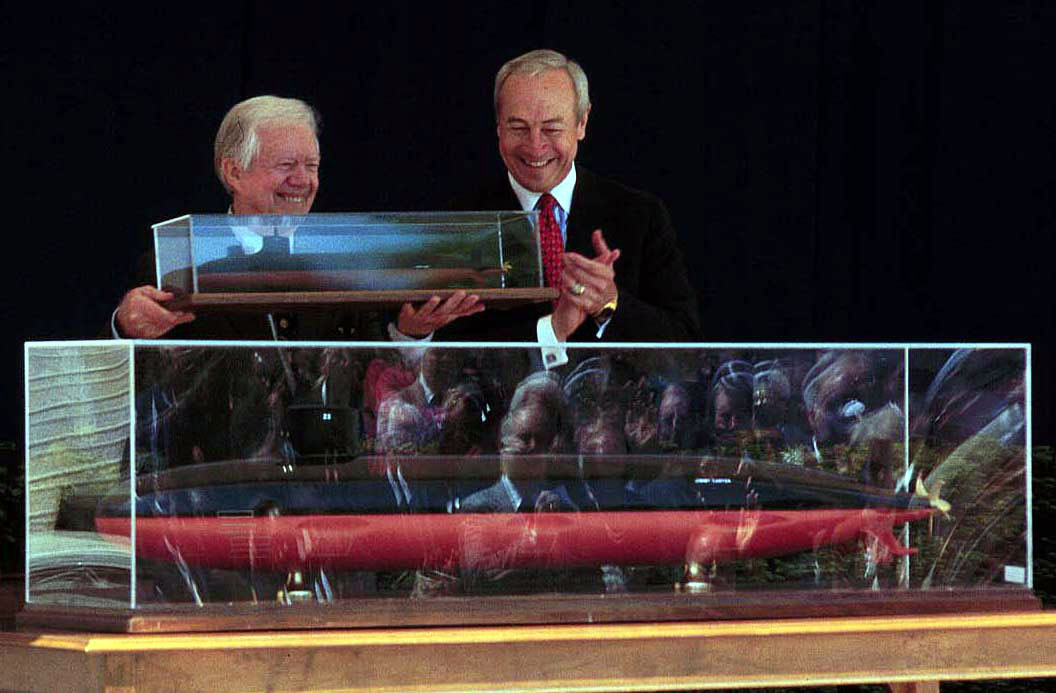
Jimmy Carter and a model of the SSN-23

- USS Ronald Reagan (CVN-76) was named in 1994; former President Ronald Reagan died in June 2004, eleven months after the ship was commissioned in July 2003.
- USNS Bob Hope (T-AKR-300) was named in 1995; Bob Hope, veteran of USO shows spanning 50 years, died in 2003.
- USS Jimmy Carter (SSN-23) was named in 1998 for former President and Navy submariner Jimmy Carter. Carter died in December 2024, 19 years after the ship was commissioned.

=== 2000s ===
- USS Nitze (DDG-94) was named in January 2001; Paul Nitze, former Secretary of the Navy, died in October 2004, before the ship was commissioned.
- USS Mustin (DDG-89) was named on December 15, 2001, in honor of the Mustin family that devoted more than a century to U.S. Naval service. Vice Admiral Henry C. Mustin died in April 2016, 13 years after the ship was commissioned, and Lieutenant Commander Thomas M. Mustin died in July 2022.
- USS George H.W. Bush (CVN-77) was named in December 2002 for former President and naval aviator George H. W. Bush. Bush died in November 2018, 9 years after his ship was commissioned.
- USS Gerald R. Ford (CVN-78) was named in October 2006; Gerald R. Ford, former President and carrier officer, died in December 2006, 8 years before the ship was commissioned.
- USS Wayne E. Meyer (DDG-108) was named on November 27, 2006, for retired Rear Admiral Wayne E. Meyer, acclaimed as the father of the Aegis combat system. Meyer died in September 2009, a few weeks before the ship was commissioned.
- USS John Warner (SSN-785) was named on January 8, 2009, five days after the Senate retirement of John Warner, a former Navy petty officer, Marine Corps officer, Secretary of the Navy, and chairman of the Senate Armed Services Committee.

=== 2010s ===
- USNS John Glenn (T-ESD-2) was named on January 4, 2012, for astronaut and politician John Glenn, who died in 2016.
- USS Gabrielle Giffords (LCS-10) was named on February 10, 2012, for Gabby Giffords, former member of the House of Representatives from Arizona who survived an assassination attempt in 2011. Navy Secretary Mabus chose the name.
- USS Thomas Hudner (DDG-116) was named on May 7, 2012, for Thomas Hudner, retired Naval officer and recipient of the Medal of Honor. Hudner died on November 13, 2017.
- USS Paul Ignatius (DDG-117) was named on May 23, 2012, for Paul Ignatius, former Secretary of the Navy, and commissioned July 27, 2019. Ignatius died on November 6, 2025, just shy of his 105th birthday and over six years after the ship's commissioning.
- USNS John Lewis (T-AO-205) was named on January 6, 2016, for John Lewis, a politician and civil rights activist. Lewis died in 2020.
- USS Hershel "Woody" Williams (ESB-4) was named on January 14, 2016, for Hershel W. Williams, a Marine warrant officer and Medal of Honor recipient. Williams died in 2022.
- USS Carl M. Levin (DDG-120) was named on April 11, 2016, for Carl Levin, a former United States senator from Michigan and chairman of the Senate Armed Services Committee. The contract for the ship, along with the name, was announced in a press release from General Dynamics, parent company of Bath Iron Works, on March 31, 2016. Levin died on July 29, 2021.
- USS Harvey C. Barnum Jr. (DDG-124), slated for commissioning in 2024, is to be named for Harvey C. Barnum Jr., a retired Marine Corps officer and recipient of the Medal of Honor, as announced by Mabus on July 28, 2016.

=== 2020s ===
- USS John F. Lehman (DDG-137) will be named for John Lehman, a former Secretary of the Navy, as announced by Navy Secretary Kenneth Braithwaite on October 13, 2020.
- USS John L. Canley (ESB-6) was named on November 10, 2020, for John L. Canley, a retired Marine Corps sergeant major and Medal of Honor recipient. Canley died in 2022.
- USS Robert E. Simanek (ESB-7) was named on January 15, 2021, for Robert E. Simanek, a Marine who received the Medal of Honor. Simanek died in 2022.
- USS J. William Middendorf (DDG-138) was named on June 10, 2022, for J. William Middendorf, a U.S. diplomat and former Navy Secretary. Then-Navy Secretary Richard Spencer announced his intention to name a ship after Middendorf in 2020; on January 11, 2023, the Navy announced that Navy Secretary Carlos Del Toro had chosen DDG-138. Middendorf died in 2025, more than three years after the naming but before the ship was formally laid down and launched.
- USNS Robert Ballard (TAGS-67) was named on December 12, 2022, for Robert Ballard, an oceanographer and Navy officer.
- USS Thomas G. Kelley (DDG-140) will be named for Thomas G. Kelley, a Navy surface-warfare officer and Medal of Honor recipient.
- USS John H. Dalton (SSN-808) will be named for John H. Dalton, a former Secretary of the Navy, as announced by Del Toro on March 1, 2023.
- USS William J. Clinton (CVN-82) and USS George W. Bush (CVN-83) will be named for former Presidents Bill Clinton and George W. Bush, as announced by President Joe Biden on January 13, 2025.
- USS Ray Mabus (DDG-147), USS Kyle Carpenter (DDG-148), and USS Everett Alvarez, Jr (FFG-68) were all announced by Del Toro on January 15, 2025. Mabus is a former Navy officer who served as Secretary of the Navy from 2009 to 2017. Carpenter is a former Marine Lance Corporal and Medal of Honor recipient. Alvarez is a former Navy officer and pilot who spent nine-years in captivity as a prisoner of war during the Vietnam War.

== See also ==
- List of United States Navy ships
- List of current ships of the United States Navy
- List of U.S. Navy losses in World War II
- List of U.S. military vessels named after women
- List of U.S. military vessels named after presidents
