= Marine Corps Marathon =

Annual race in the U.S. since 1976

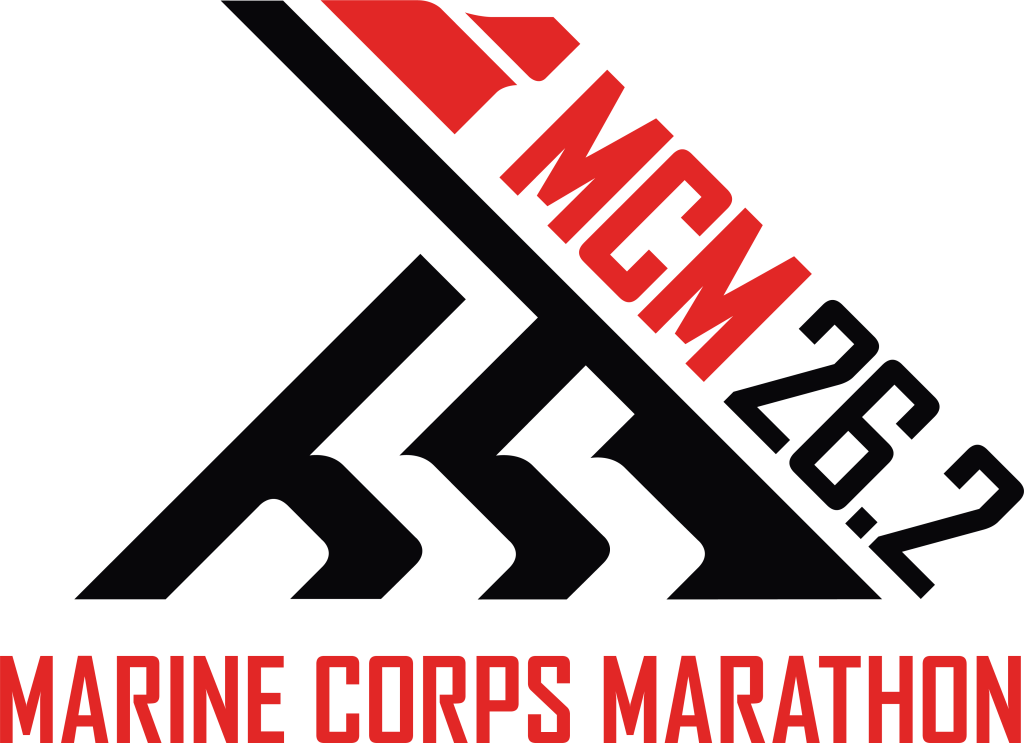
- The Marine Corps Marathon logo
- Date: The last Sunday of October
- Location: Arlington, Virginia and Washington, D.C., United States
- Event type: Road
- Distance: Marathon; 26.219 miles (42.195 km)
- Primary sponsor: United States Marine Corps
- Established: 1976 (50 years ago)
- Course records: 2:14:01 Jeffrey Scuffins (1987); 2:34:08 Tessa Barrett (2025)
- Website: www.marinemarathon.com
- Participants: 40,000 (2025)

The Marine Corps Marathon (MCM) is an annual marathon (42.195 km or 26.219 mi) that courses through Arlington County, Virginia and Washington, D.C., United States. It is the third largest marathon in the United States, with approximately 40,000 finishers in 2025.

The race is organized by the Marine Corps Marathon Organization, an instrumentality of Marine Corps Base Quantico, and has been run every year since 1976, with the exception of 2020 and 2021, when it was cancelled due to the COVID-19 pandemic. The race is held on the last Sunday in October, just prior to the U.S. Marine Corps Birthday. Known as "The People's Marathon", the race does not use a lottery system, offering entry to anyone over age 14. The marathon is the largest in the world which does not offer prize money. The race course is a mostly flat, paved loop which begins adjacent to Arlington National Cemetery, passes through the western quadrants of Washington, D.C., and returns to Virginia to finish at the Marine Corps War Memorial.

Runners of the 51st MCM on the National Mall in 2026.

== History ==
=== 20th century ===
On October 17, 1975, MCM founder Colonel James L. Fowler wrote a memo to his supervisor, Major General Michael P. Ryan, outlining his idea of creating a Marine Corps Reserve Marathon to promote goodwill between the military and the post-Vietnam community. Colonel Fowler believed an event like this would showcase the Marine Corps, serve as a recruiting tool, and give local Marines an opportunity to qualify for the Boston Marathon. The Marathon also serves as a way to raise money for a wide variety of charities.

General Ryan embraced the idea of a Marine marathon and submitted it to then Marine Corps Commandant General Louis H. Wilson Jr. for approval. With General Wilson's backing, the planning process for the first MCM began. With news of the inaugural marathon quickly spreading, Gunnery Sergeant Alex Breckenridge, a member of the 1960 Olympic Marathon Team, soon lent his support. With Gunnery Sergeant Breckenridge acting as an ambassador for the marathon effort, local jurisdictions approved of the event.

Through the efforts of the marathon coordinators and with support from Secretary of the Navy, J. William Middendorf, the inaugural running of the MCM was held on November 7, 1976. The 1,175 participants ran a course through northern Virginia and finished at the Marine Corps War Memorial, becoming the first of thousands of MCM runners over a span of 38 years to take the final hill and finish at the Iwo Jima memorial. Kenneth Moore of Eugene, Oregon, finished the inaugural event with a time of 2:21:14, becoming the first MCM winner. He was awarded a trophy, provided by Secretary Middendorf. for his achievement.

Marathon organizers examined the course for the 1977 MCM and secured permits to run through Washington, D.C. The new route laid the foundation for the traditional scenic run, starting in Arlington County, Virginia, winding its way around key landmarks in the nation's capital, and returning for the finish at the Marine Corps War Memorial. With the changes to the course and a surge of positive publicity from the first running, the second MCM drew a field of 2,655 runners.

Participation in the MCM steadily increased over the next few years, resulting in a transfer of race coordination from the Marine Corps Reserve to active-duty Marines at Marine Barracks. Shortly thereafter, even more growth necessitated a move south to Marine Corps Base Quantico in 1982, where the MCM headquarters remains.

Additions to MCM weekend include the MCM10K, starting at the National Mall and finishing at the Iwo Jima monument; the MCM Kids Run, a 1-mile (1.6 km) event held one day prior to the MCM; and the MCM Forward, where Marines stationed throughout the world participate in a satellite 26.2-mile (42.2 km) run simultaneously with the MCM. The MCM and all associated events continue to promote physical fitness, generate community goodwill and showcase the organizational skills of the United States Marine Corps.

=== 21st century ===
Tessa Barrett set the Women's course record in the 50th anniversary race in 2025.

The 2020 in-person edition of the race was cancelled due to the coronavirus pandemic, with all registrants given the option of transferring their entry to 2021, 2022, or 2023 or obtaining a full refund. (Note: Registrants who had already transferred their registration to the virtual event or to a later year were also given the option of obtaining a full refund.) Similarly, the 2021 in-person edition of the race was cancelled due to the pandemic, with all registrants given the option of running the race virtually, transferring their entry to 2022, or obtaining a full refund.

In 2023, over 23,000 runners registered for the 48th MCM.

In 2025, the Marine Corps Marathon celebrated 50 years with over 40,000 participants racing.

== Course ==
The course, which varies slightly from year to year, is certified by USA Track and Field. The current route starts in Arlington, Virginia, on Route 110 and winds its way through Rosslyn along Langston Boulevard before turning on Spout Run and the George Washington Memorial Parkway. Runners experience a climb on Langston Boulevard in the first few miles of the course, but are rewarded with a descent along Spout Run and the GW Parkway.

After crossing Key Bridge into Georgetown, runners used to turn toward the Palisades Community when the course followed Canal Road, up to the reservoir and down MacArthur Boulevard. However, the new course guides runners down popular M Street in Georgetown.

The 51st MCM on M St. NW in the Georgetown neighborhood of Washington, D.C. in 2026.

Runners turn on Wisconsin Avenue and then K Street before looping under K street onto Rock Creek Parkway. The course proceeds approximately 2.5 miles north on Rock Creek Parkway before turning back, then passing the Kennedy Center. Runners then pass the back of the Lincoln Memorial before continuing on Ohio Drive into East Potomac Park'sHains Point at the halfway mark.

Outside West Potomac Park, runners get a glimpse of the Jefferson Memorial and Tidal Basin. On Independence Avenue, competitors run by the newly unveiled Martin Luther King, Jr. National Memorial and FDR Memorial. The runners loop back along Independence Avenue on the side closest to the National Mall and the Korean War Veterans Memorial and National World War II Memorial before making a left turn onto 15th Street at the Washington Monument.

At Madison Drive, runners pass the north side of the National Mall, running by the Smithsonian Institution's National Museum of American History and the National Gallery of Art. After a loop around the reflecting pool in front of the U.S. Capitol, runners continue along the south side of the National Mall past the Smithsonian Castle. Runners move along Jefferson Drive and turn onto the 14th Street to marathon's "Beat the Bridge" checkpoint at mile 20 before returning to Virginia via the 14th Street Bridge.

For the last 10 kilometers, runners enjoy the color and energy of Crystal City in Arlington County, Virginia. At The Pentagon, runners pass in close proximity to the Pentagon Memorial honoring the victims of 9/11. Finally, the course unfurls alongside the Arlington National Cemetery then offers a final, up-hill challenge to the finish at the Marine Corps War Memorial. This finish has remained unchanged since the inaugural running of the MCM in 1976.

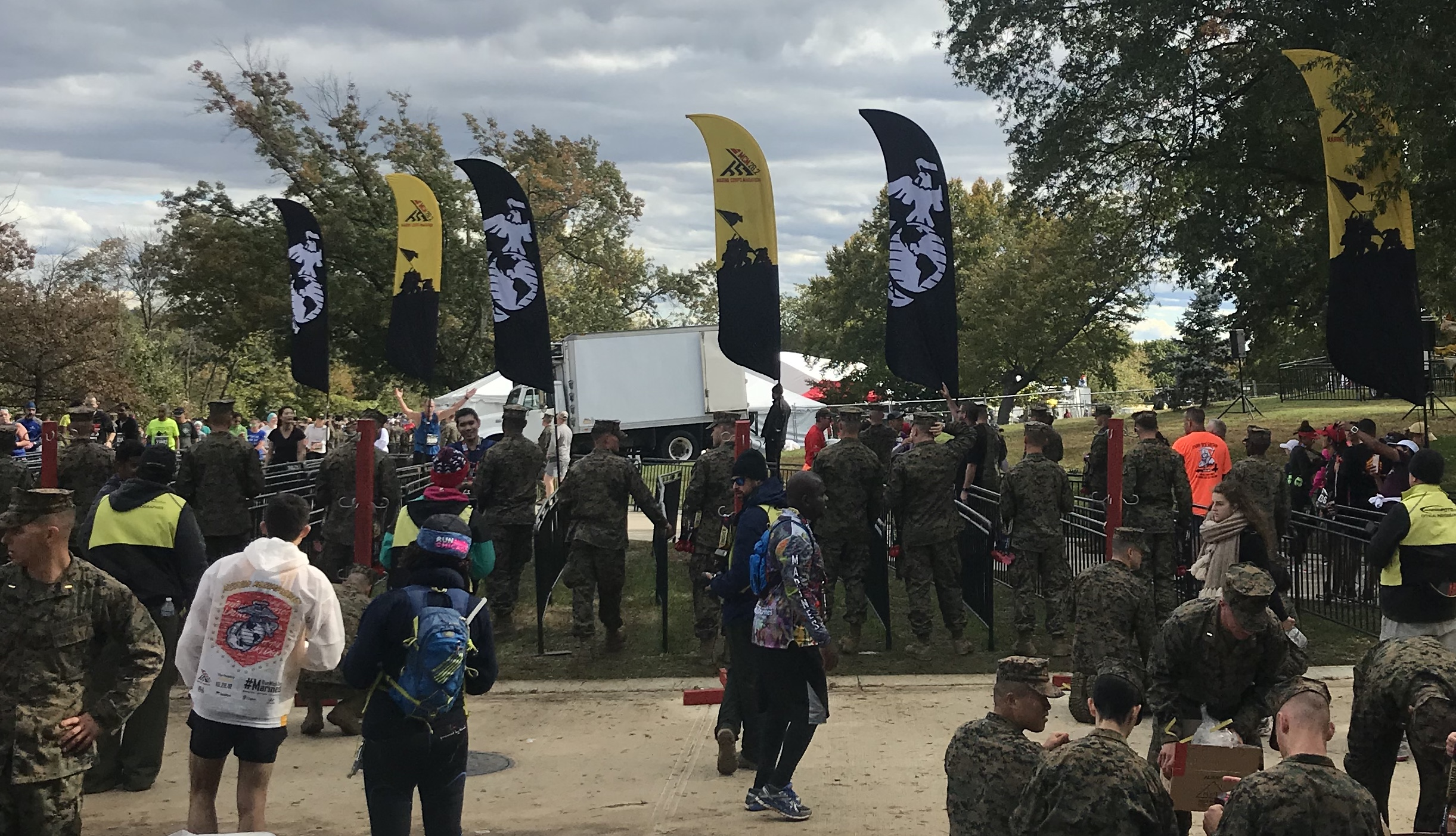
Marines awarding medals to runners in the MCM finish area in 2018

== MCM Weekend ==
=== MCM10K ===
In 2006, the Marine Corps Marathon introduced the MCM10K, a 10-kilometer (6.2-mile) run starting at the National Mall in Washington, DC. The MCM10K and MCM begin simultaneously with MCM10K runners joining the final leg of the marathon course, sharing in the iconic finish up the hill to the Marine Corps War Memorial. Since its inception, the MCM10K has steadily increased in popularity. In 2012, the event sold out with 10,000 registered runners.

In 2011 a new MCM10K course record was set by Reuben Mwei, a native of the Kenya residing in Acworth, GA. His finishing time of 00:30:37 crushed the previous record of 00:32:54 set by Wyatt Boyd of Washington, DC, in 2009.

=== MCM Finish Festival ===
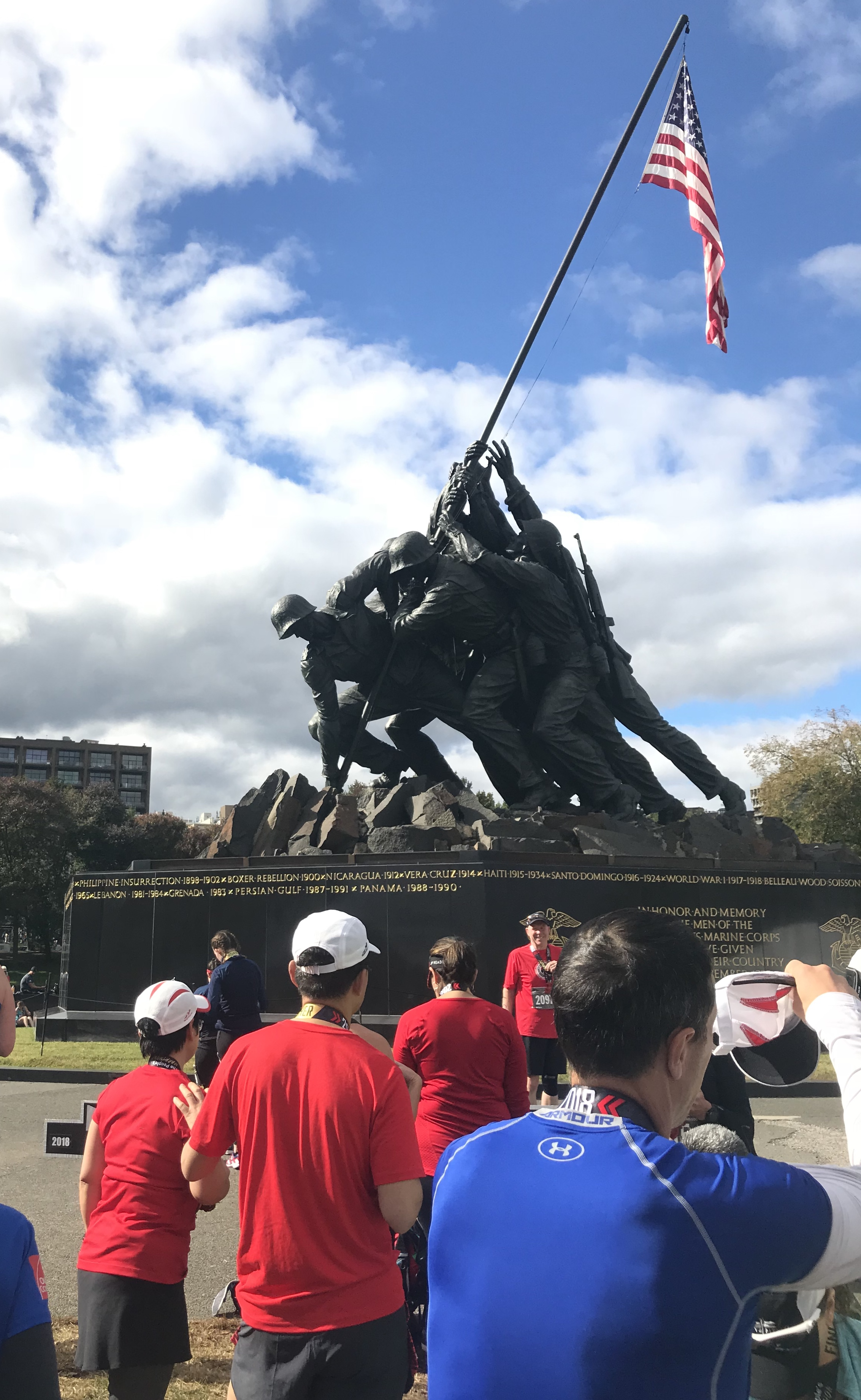
The Marine Corps War Memorial in Arlington Ridge Park at the 2018 MCM finish area

Runners celebrate MCM and MCM10K finishes in the post-event Finish Festival located in Rosslyn, Virginia. Runners, spectators, and the community are welcome to enjoy food, including a Restaurant Row that includes several Rosslyn eateries, live music, sponsor displays, entertainment and giveaways.

Essential runner services are also located in the Finish Festival, to include Family Link Up, Info/Medical Tent, Massage, UPS Baggage Claim, and the Michelob Ultra Beer Garden. Transportation from the Finish Festival includes shuttles to Crystal City, Virginia, Metro access at the Rosslyn station, and taxi service.

=== MCM Kids Run ===
The MCM Kids Run is a 1 mi (1.6 km) event held annually the day before the MCM. Children ages 5 through 12 are eligible to participate in the fun run located in the Pentagon North Parking Lot. Once children have completed the run, they can visit Camp Miles, a festival area with healthy activities and games promoting physical fitness.

School groups participating in the MCM Kids Run compete for a Healthy School Award. This award is based on student participation and is awarded to the top five schools with the most runners. Winning schools receive a donation to their physical education department presented by MCM partner Sodexo.

=== MCM Health & Fitness Expo ===
All registered MCM, MCM10K, and MCM Kids Run participants must attend packet pick up at the MCM Health and Fitness Expo. Held in the two days prior to the MCM, the Health and Fitness Expo features more than 200 booths and interactive displays for runner enjoyment. Supported by nearly 300 military and civilian volunteers, the expo attracts nearly 100,000 runners and guests.

=== Carbo Dining In ===
The Carbo Dining In is an annual event held on the evening preceding the Marine Corps Marathon at the Gaylord National Resort and Convention Center. The program provides carbohydrate intake, guest speakers, and Marine Corps-themed entertainment for participating runners.

The unique name - Carbo Dining In - separates it from other pasta parties and carb loads by paying homage to a traditional military dining in, an evening that includes dinner and other events to foster camaraderie and esprit de corps.

The evening program offers music, live entertainment and a featured speaker. Previous motivational addresses have been provided by Robert Swan, OBE, Dave McGillivary, Kathrine Switzer, Larry Rawson, Deena Kastor and Roger Robinson. With appearances by Miles and Molly, the MCM bulldog mascots, prize giveaways, and the camaraderie of runners, it is a popular way to prepare for "The People's Marathon."

=== MCM Pep Rally ===
Introduced in 2010, the MCM Pep Rally is open to all marathon runners. The evening offers the chance for runners to receive last-minute information and inspiration from an expert panel of runners, coaches, Clif Pace Team leaders, Brooks consultants, and MCM staff members, among others.

== Winners ==
Key: Course record (in bold)

Ed.	Year	Men's winner	Time	Women's winner	Time
1	1976	Kenny Moore (USA)	2:24:14	Susan Mallery (USA)	2:56:33
2	1977	Kevin McDonald (USA)	2:19:36	Susan Mallery (USA)	2:54:04
3	1978	Scott Eden (USA)	2:18:08	Jane Killion (USA)	3:01:34
4	1979	Phil Camp (USA)	2:19:35	Joanna Martin (USA)	2:58:14
5	1980	Michael Hurd (GBR)	2:16:55^{†}	Jan Yerkes (USA)	2:39:53^{†}
6	1981	Dean Matthews (USA)	2:16:31	Cynthia Lorenzoni (USA)	2:50:33
7	1982	Jeffrey Smith (USA)	2:21:29	Cynthia Lorenzoni (USA)	2:44:51
8	1983	Farley Simon (USA)	2:17:46	Susan Carden (USA)	2:45:55
9	1984	Brad Ingram (USA)	2:19:40	Pamela Briscoe (USA)	2:43:20
10	1985	Thomas Bernard (USA)	2:19:16	Natalie Updegrove (USA)	2:44:42
11	1986	Brad Ingram (USA)	2:23:13	Kathy Champagne (USA)	2:42:59
12	1987	**Jeffrey Scuffins (USA)**	**2:14:01**	Mary Robertson (USA)	2:44:36
13	1988	James Hage (USA)	2:21:59	Lori Lawson (USA)	2:51:26
14	1989	James Hage (USA)	2:20:23	Laura deWald (USA)	2:45:16
15	1990	Matthew Waight (USA)	2:21:32	Olga Markova (RUS)	2:37:00
16	1991	Carlos Rivas (MEX)	2:17:54	Amy Kattwinkel (USA)	2:44:27
17	1992	René Guerrero (MEX)	2:24:09	Judy Mercon (USA)	2:47:58
18	1993	Dominique Bariod (FRA)	2:23:56	Holly Ebert (USA)	2:48:41
19	1994	Graciano González (MEX)	2:22:51	Susan Molloy (USA)	2:39:34
20	1995	Darrell General (USA)	2:16:34	Claudia Kasen (USA)	2:49:21
21	1996	Isaac García (MEX)	2:15:09	Emma Cabrera (MEX)	2:48:34
22	1997	Darrell General (USA)	2:18:20	Donna Moore (USA)	2:53:42
23	1998	Weldon Johnson (USA)	2:25:31	Kimberly Markland (USA)	2:49:07
24	1999	Mark Croasdale (GBR)	2:23:27	Donna Moore (USA)	2:51:53
25	2000	Richard Cochrane (USA)	2:25:50	Elizabeth Ruel (CAN)	2:47:52
26	2001	Farley Simon (USA)	2:28:28	Lori Stich (USA)	2:48:13
27	2002	Christopher Juárez (USA)	2:25:01	Elizabeth Scanlon (USA)	2:57:27
28	2003	Peter Sherry (USA)	2:25:07	Heather Hanscom (USA)	2:37:59
29	2004	Retta Feyissa (ETH)	2:25:35	May Kate Bailey (USA)	2:48:31
30	2005	Rubén García (MEX)	2:22:18	Susannah Kvasnicka (USA)	2:47:10
31	2006	Rubén García (MEX)	2:21:21	Laura Thompson (USA)	3:00:23
32	2007	Tamerat Alemayehu (ETH)	2:22:20	Kristen Henehan (USA)	2:51:14
33	2008	Andrew Dumm (USA)	2:22:44	Cate Fenster (USA)	2:48:55
34	2009	John Mentzer (USA)	2:21:47	Muliye Lemma (ETH)	2:49:48
35	2010	Jacob Bradosky (USA)	2:23:30	Janet Cherobon (KEN)	2:39:19
36	2011	Charles Ware (USA)	2:19:16	Tezeta Dengersa (TUR)	2:45:28
37	2012	Augustus Maiyo (USA)	2:20:20	Hirut Beyene (ETH)	2:42:03
38	2013	Bedada Girma (ETH)	2:21:32	Kelly Calway (USA)	2:42:16
39	2014	Samuel Kosgei (KEN)	2:22:12	Meghan Curran (USA)	2:51:46
40	2015	Trevor Lafontaine (USA)	2:24:25	Jenny Méndez (CRC)	2:45:56
41	2016	Samuel Kosgei (USA)	2:23:52	Perry Shoemaker (USA)	2:51:47
42	2017	Desta Morkama (ETH)	2:25:13	Sarah Bishop (USA)	2:45:06
43	2018	Jeffrey Stein (USA)	2:22:49	Jenny Méndez (CRC)	2:40:19
44	2019	Jordan Tropf (USA)	2:27:43	Brittany Charboneau (USA)	2:44:47
45	2020	cancelled due to coronavirus pandemic			
46	2021	cancelled due to coronavirus pandemic			
47	2022	Kyle King (USA)	2:19:19	Chelsea Baker (UK)	2:42:38
48	2023	Julius K Kogo (USA)	2:25:56	Bonnie A Keating (USA)	2:50:49
49	2024	Kyle King (USA)	2:25:06	Tessa Barrett (USA)	2:39:36
50	2025	Kyle King (USA)	2:18:51	**Tessa Barrett (USA)**	**2:34:08**
51	2026	Kyle King (USA)	2:17:31	Kaylee Slade (USA)	2:44:34

^{†} = Short course

- List of winners through 2017 from Association of Road Racing Statisticians, subsequent results from World Athletics.

== Notable finishers ==
Year	Athlete	Time
2025	Michael Baumgartner, congressman	5:25:39
2019	Jordan Ramirez, age 10, youngest to complete a marathon on 7 continents	6:48:48
2019	David Berger, commandant of the Marine Corps	5:29:38
2016	Nikolas Toocheck, age 14, youngest to run a marathon in all 50 U.S. states	6:03:18
2015	Joseph Dunford, chairman of the Joint Chiefs of Staff (5th race)	5:18:48
2014	Kyle Carpenter, recipient of the Medal of Honor	5:07:45
2014	Sean Astin, actor	4:29:11
2011	Drew Carey, actor	4:37:11
2008	Adrian Fenty, mayor of Washington, D.C.	3:37:20
2007	Shannon Schambeau, Miss DC 2005	4:54:16
2006	Harvey Walden IV, media personality	5:01:00
2005	Mike Huckabee, governor and ambassador	4:37:29
2003	Jon Porter, congressman	5:40:37
2001	Richie McDonald, country singer	4:35:20
1998	Andrew Baldwin, winner of The Bachelor season 10	3:20:28
1998	Jill Biden, First Lady	4:30:32
1997	Al Gore, Vice President	4:54:25
1994	Oprah Winfrey, media personality	4:29:15
1983	Ted Koppel, news anchor and journalist	5:09:08
1983	John Edwards, senator and vice presidential nominee	3:30:18
1980	Clarence Thomas, associate justice of the U.S. Supreme Court	3:11:xx
1977	Joseph Dunford, future chairman of the Joint Chiefs of Staff	xx:xx:xx
Citations:

== Marine Corps Historic Half Marathon ==
The Marine Corps Historic Half (MCHH), held in Fredericksburg, VA, takes participants on a 13.1 mi (21.1 km) journey from the retail hub of Central Park through historic downtown streets, up Hospital Hill, and back to waiting Marines at the finish line. Held annually in May and open to ages 10 and up, the event boasts a field of 8,000 runners. The Historic Half also offers the Semper 5ive, a five-mile event open to 2,000 participants. New in 2017 was the Devil Dog Double. Runners competing in this challenge will complete both the Semper 5ive and the Historic Half on Sunday, May 21. All events finish at the Fredericksburg Expo and Conference Center with the Semper 5ive starting in downtown Fredericksburg.

The Healthy Lifestyle Expo will be held in conjunction with the Marine Corps Historic Half during the days prior to the event. Located at the Fredericksburg Expo and Conference Center, this free event is open to the public and will showcase health, fitness, food, and exercise through featured vendors such as Mary Washington Hospital, Geico, and Jelly Belly Sport Beans. Fredericksburg Expo and Conference Center is located at 2371 Carl D. Silver Parkway, Fredericksburg, VA 22401.

On March 31, 2020, in response to the COVID-19 pandemic, the Marine Corps Historic Half Marathon and all the events planned with it were canceled when Virginia Gov. Ralph Northam ordered a "stay at home" order for the state until June 10. However, on April 27, 2020, the Marine Corps Historic Half Marathon became a virtual event with the help of their technology partner, haku.

== MCM Event Series ==
Held aboard Marine Corps Base Quantico and the surrounding community, the 2017 MCM Event Series featured five weekends of events celebrating the accomplishment of distance running by wrapping each event in a distinct experience that showcases the organizational excellence of the United States Marine Corps.

March 25 - The first run of the event series, the Marine Corps 17.75K, offers participants the unique opportunity to secure a golden ticket, which is a guaranteed spot in the 2017 MCM. This event celebrates the founding of the United States Marine Corps in 1775 and travels through Prince William Forest Park in Dumfries, VA.

April 29 - Introduced in 2017, the Quantico 100 celebrates the 100th anniversary of Marine Corps Base Quantico. Participants have 100 minutes to log as many miles as possible during this evening run.

June 10 – Consistently sold out, the Run Amuck and Mini Run Amuck encourage runners to get down and dirty. Run Amuck participants run a 4 mi (6.4 km) course through trails with mud pits, low crawls and various obstacles culminating in a fire hose dousing just before reaching the finish line. Mini- muckers share in on the fun by completing a scaled-down, 2 mi (3.2 km) version of the course.

August 19 The Quantico Tri is a sprint distance event held aboard Marine Corps Base Quantico. Participants complete a 750-meter (820-yard) swim, a 20 km (12 mi) bike course, and a 5 km (3.1 mi) run. For 2014, chip timing was introduced providing the most accurate results for participants.("RunnersWeb Triathlon: Quantico Tri Introduces Upgrades to Athlete Experience." RunnersWeb Triathlon: Quantico Tri Introduces Upgrades to Athlete Experience. N.p., n.d. Web. 25 Nov. 2014.) The Quantico Tri additionally features the Quantico 12K run which runs through the trails of famed Officer Candidates School aboard the Marine Corps Base.

November 18 – The final event in the MCM Event Series is the Turkey Trot 10K and the accompanying Turkey Trot Mile. There is a 11.6 km (7.2 mi) adult course while kids can run the 1.6 km (0.99 mi) course.

== Facts and trivia ==
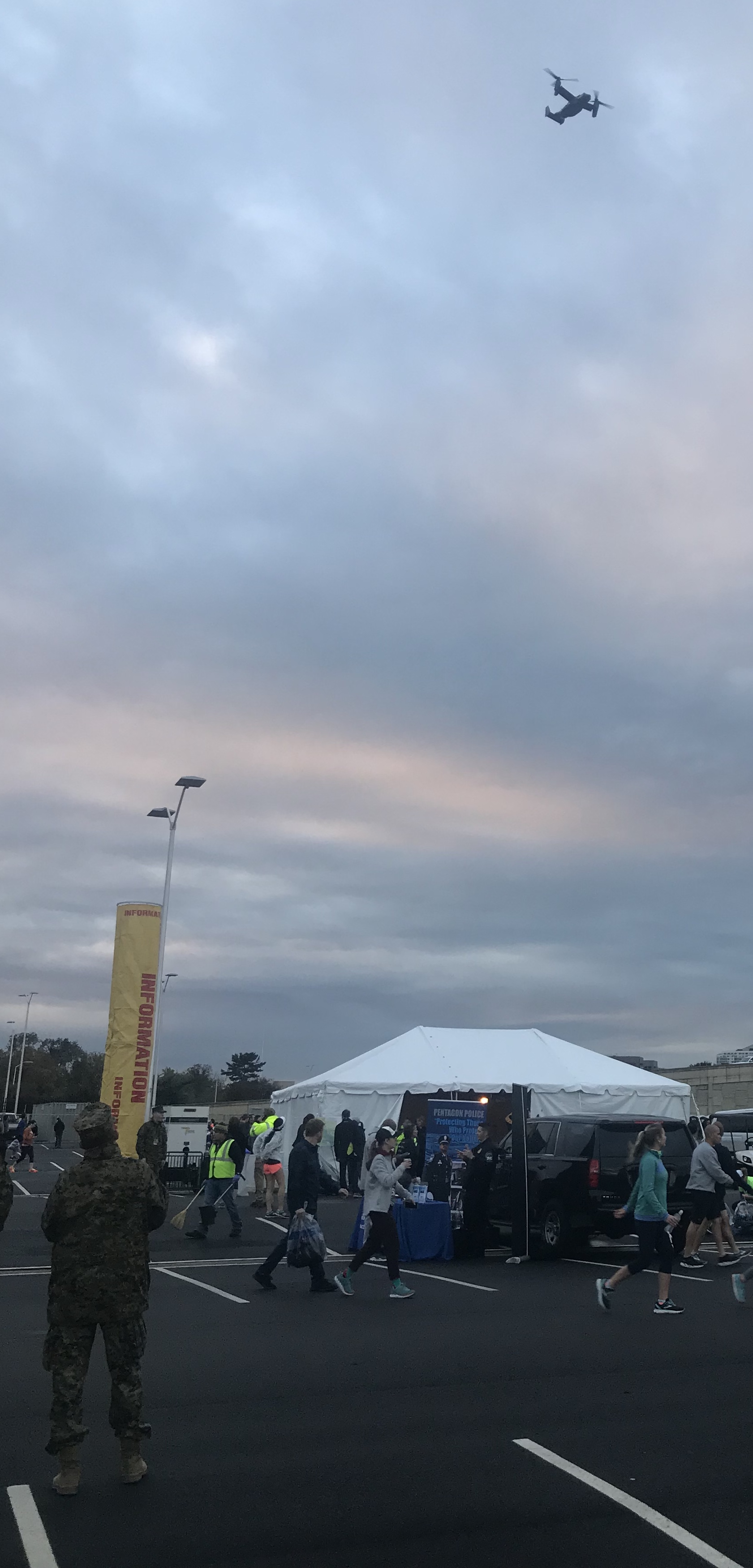
Bell Boeing V-22 Osprey flying over start of 2018 MCM

Start Marathons and other road races are traditionally started with a pistol. The Marine Corps Marathon boasts a slightly bigger starting gun: A 105mm Howitzer. The 2014 starting ceremonies included Medal of Honor recipient, Kyle Carpenter, parachuting to the start and delivering a 7,800 square-foot American flag. (Lin, C. J. "Big Day for Army Runners at 39th Marine Corps Marathon." McClatchy - Tribune Business News. Oct 26 2014. ProQuest. Web. 25 Nov. 2014.)

Ground Pounders Only one individual as of 2016 had completed every marathon since the inaugural running in 1976: Al Richmond of Arlington, VA. Fittingly, Richmond is a retired US Marine. At the 25th running of the MCM, this elite group was given the name "Ground Pounders" at a ceremony at the Washington Post.

Sold Out! The 15th running of the MCM was the first to sell out with a field of 13,000 runners. In 2011 the MCM sold out within 28 hours of registration opening, filling the 30,000 runner capacity. For the 2012 MCM, all 30,000 registration sold out within 2 hours 41 minutes. In 2014, a lottery was introduced for the first time for those applying to run in the Marine Corps Marathon. RACE IT, race services division of Competitor Group, Inc., was awarded a multi-year agreement to provide registration services to facilitate online entries for the MCM. ("Race IT Awarded Marine Corps Marathon Contract." PR Newswire Oct 15 2013. ProQuest. Web. 25 Nov. 2014.)

Challenge Cup The Challenge Cup competition was initiated at the MCM in 1978. The Challenge Cup is a competition between the United States Marine Corps and the British Royal Navy/Marine running teams. An 1897 Victorian silver cup, donated by the British in 1978, is awarded to the winner each year. A female division was added in 1998. The finish time for the top three runners for each team are added and the lowest total running time is declared the winner.

MCM Mascots Miles the Bulldog and his sister Molly are faithful MCM companions, cheering on and entertaining runners at all MCM events. Miles models bib number 1775 to honor the year the USMC was founded, while Molly proudly displays bib number 1943, a nod to the year in which the Marine Corps Women's Reserve was created. In 2011, Miles added "10K Finisher" to his resume when he impressively completed all 6.2 miles of the MCM10K.

USMC Runners The first female active duty Marine MCM winner was 1st Lieutenant Joanna Martin at the 1979 MCM. Martin, a native of Woodbridge, VA and stationed at Camp Pendleton, CA at the time, finished with a time of 2:58:14. Four years later, the first male active duty Marine won the MCM. Sergeant Farley Simon of Alea, Hawaii finished with a time of 2:17:46.

2001 Marine Corps Marathon The status of the 2001 MCM was in serious question until three weeks prior to the scheduled event day. Post-9/11, approval by the Commandant of the Marine Corps to proceed with the marathon was contingent upon a new security plan. With approval in place, mile five on the MCM course gave runners an up-close view of the terrorist attack on the Pentagon. Many 2001 MCM finishers agree this was a very special year. More than 15,000 runners from 50 states and 39 countries participated in the 26th annual Marine Corps Marathon.

Shadow Runs The Marine Corps Marathon is one of the top stateside military event with sanctioned "shadow runs." In 2014, the shadow run was held at Camp Leatherneck, Afghanistan.(Miller, and Amanda. "Event Rundown." Army Times (2014): 31. ProQuest. Web. 25 Nov. 2014.)

Social Media The popularity of the Marine Corps Marathon continued to grow as more social media sites developed: Blogs, Facebook, YouTube and Twitter.
