= Jeffrey Scuffins =

American long-distance runner

Personal information
- Born: June 16, 1962 Hagerstown, Maryland, U.S.
- Died: March 20, 2021 (aged 58) Williamsport, Maryland, U.S.

Sport
- Sport: Track, long-distance running
- Event(s): 10,000 metres, half marathon, marathon
- College team: Clemson University

Achievements and titles
- Personal best(s): 10,000m: 28:40.0; Marathon: 2:14:01

Jeffrey Scuffins (June 16, 1962 - March 20, 2021) was a former distance runner. He set a course record at the 1987 Marine Corps Marathon, which still stands.

== Running career ==
=== High school ===
Scuffins attended North Hagerstown High School, where he ran cross country and track. In 1980, he set the school and county record in the boy's 1600 meters at 4:18.84. The Hagerstown county record stood for 32 years until it was broken by Williamsport High School runner Evan Hardy in 2012.

=== Collegiate ===
After graduating from North Hagerstown, Scuffins attended Clemson University, where he graduated in 1985. He finished among the top 100 men at the 1984 NCAA DI Cross Country Championships.

=== Post-collegiate ===
On May 25, 1985, he was the men's winner over runner-up Sosthenes Bitok at the Travel Run 10K run in Crystal City, Virginia, in a time of 29:13. He was given $2,500 in prize money for the victory. On November 8, 1987, Scuffins finished in first place among men at the Marine Corps Marathon, setting a course record of 2:14:01. His first half marathon split was 1:06:49, with the race temperature hovering above 60 degrees fahrenheit.

== Honors ==
Scuffins was inducted into the Marine Corps Marathon Hall of Fame in 2008 for his course record of 2:14:01.

== Death ==
Scuffins was found dead in his apartment in Williamsport, Maryland, the morning of Saturday, March 20, 2021, according to his friends. The cause of death was unknown.
