= USS Van Buren =

USS Van Buren has been the name of two ships in the United States Navy. The first ship was named after President Martin Van Buren, while the second was named after the city of Van Buren, Arkansas.

- USS Van Buren (1839), a schooner-rigged revenue cutter
- USS Van Buren (PF-42), a Tacoma-class frigate in commission from 1943 to 1946

== See also ==
- USS John J. Van Buren (DE-753)
