= Andrew Dumm =

American long-distance runner

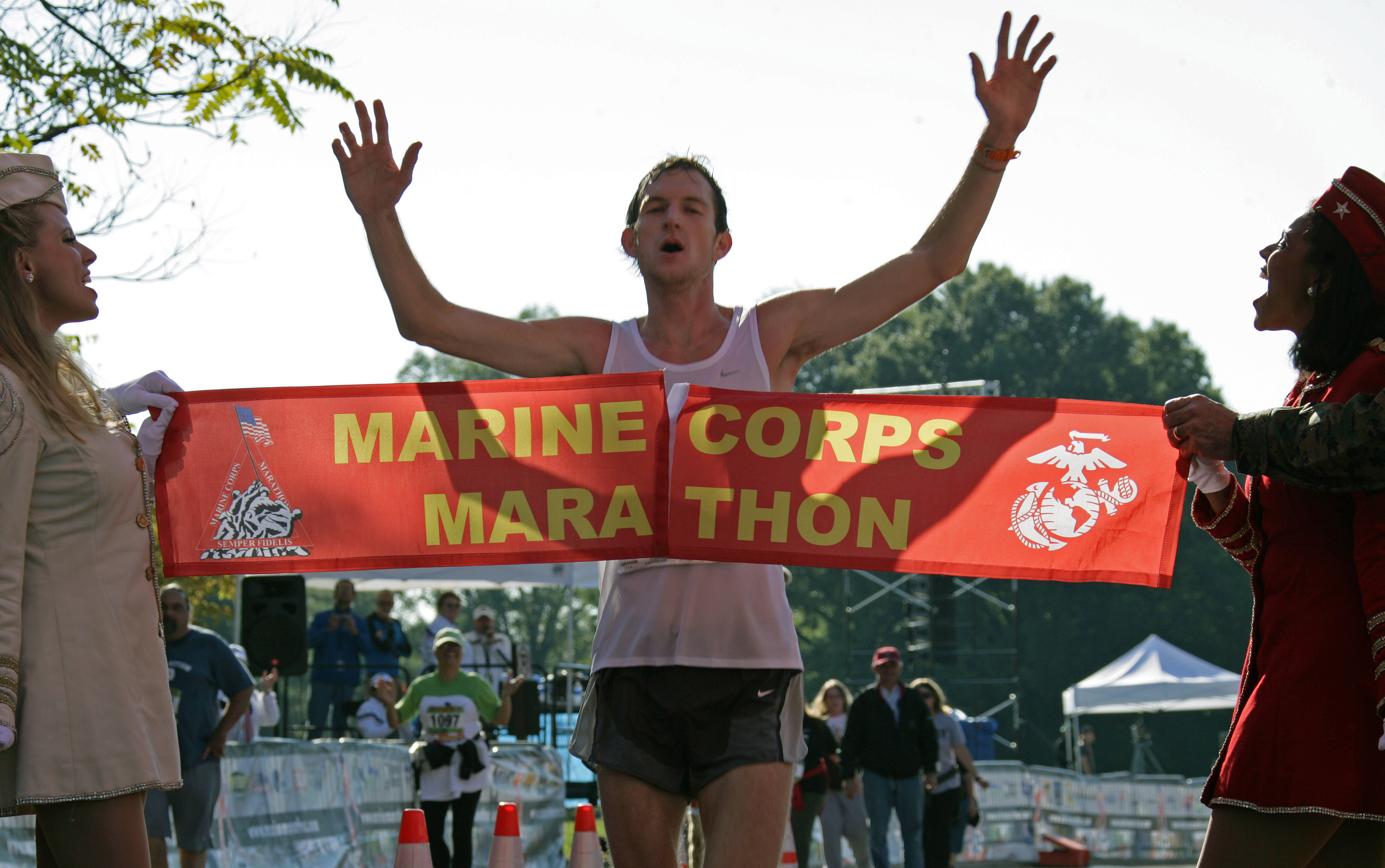
- Dumm winning the 2008 Marine Corps Marathon

Personal information
- Born: February 11, 1985 (age 41) Fairfax, Virginia, U.S.

Sport
- Sport: Track, long-distance running
- Event(s): 5000 meters, 10,000 meters, marathon
- College team: Virginia

Achievements and titles
- Personal best(s): 5000m: 14:07.04; 10,000m: 28:59.25 ½ marathon: 1:05:41; Marathon: 2:20:46

Andrew Dumm (born 11 February 1985) is a long-distance runner. He competed for the University of Virginia before he began running marathons. He was the winner of the 2008 Marine Corps Marathon. He is the younger brother of Brian Dumm, who is also a distance runner.

== Running career ==
=== High school ===
Dumm attended Robinson Secondary School until he graduated in 2003 with his high school's MVP nomination and All-District honors. As a high-schooler, he recorded a personal best of 9:51.29 in the 3200 meters.

=== Collegiate ===
Although not recruited while in high school, Dumm walked on the cross-country team while attending the University of Virginia, for which he would be most successful in the 5000 meters and 10,000 meters distances. In 2006, he was named in the U.S. Track and Field and Cross Country Coaches Association's National All-Academic team. By the end of his collegiate career, he was named All-ACC honoree three times as well as being named ESPN's The Magazine Academic All-American.

=== Post-collegiate ===
Dumm began his first marathon training cycle in August 2008, after which his training volume peaked at 107 miles in a week. In his marathon debut, Dumm surprised a competitive international field and won the 2008 Marine Corps Marathon with a time of 2:22:44. On October 10, 2010, he finished 21st at the 2010 Chicago Marathon, recording a personal best time of 2:20:46.
