= USS Gabrielle Giffords =

Independence-class littoral combat ship

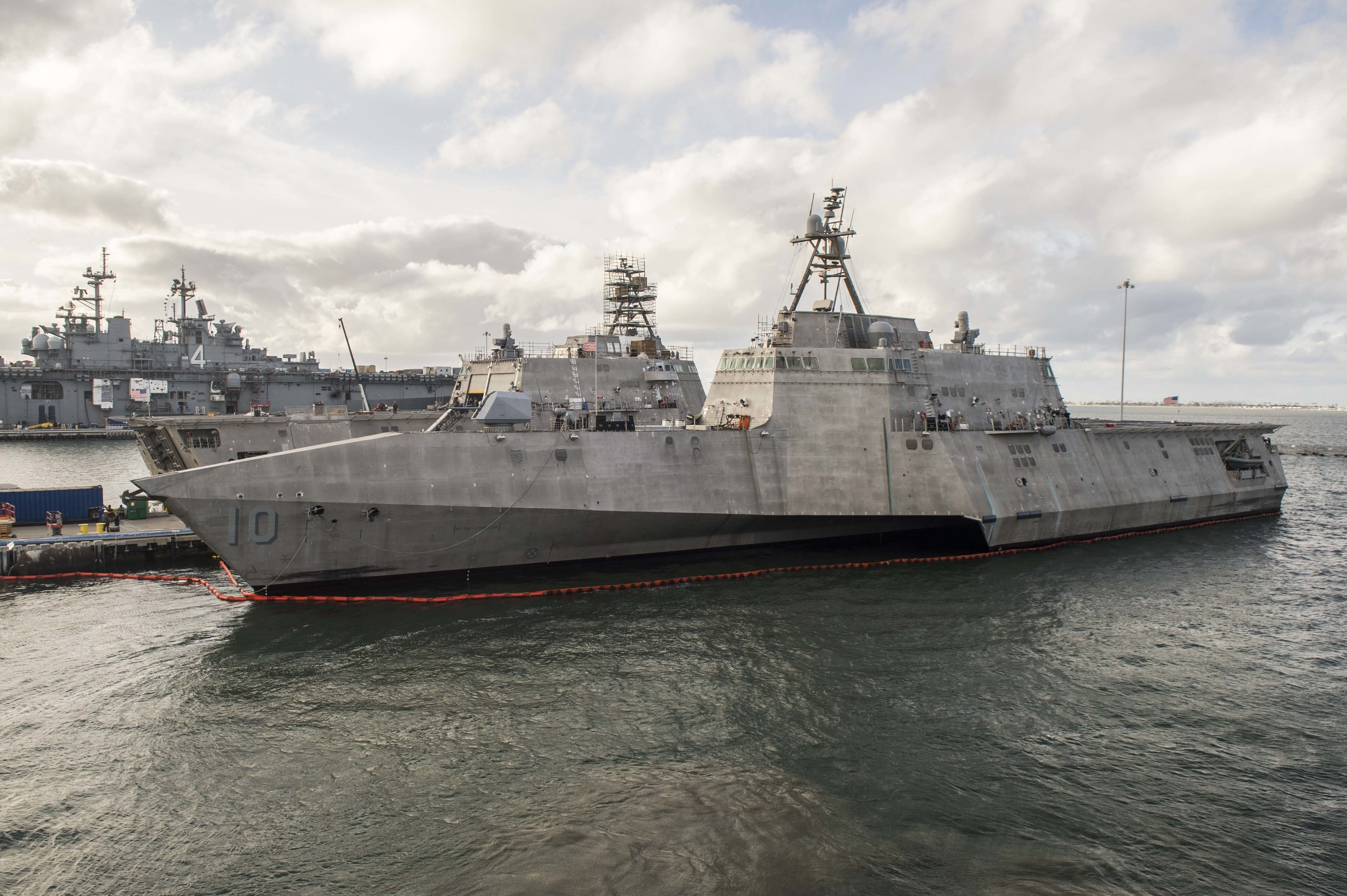
- USS Gabrielle Giffords in San Diego on 20 October 2017

History

United States
- Name: Gabrielle Giffords
- Namesake: Gabby Giffords
- Awarded: 16 March 2012
- Builder: Austal USA
- Cost: US$475 million
- Laid down: 16 April 2014
- Launched: 25 February 2015
- Sponsored by: Roxanna Green; Jill Biden
- Christened: 13 June 2015
- Acquired: 23 December 2016
- Commissioned: 10 June 2017
- Home port: Seattle
- Identification: MMSI number: 368926014; Callsign: NGBG; Hull number: LCS-10
- Motto: Je Suis Prest; (I Am Ready)
- Status: Active
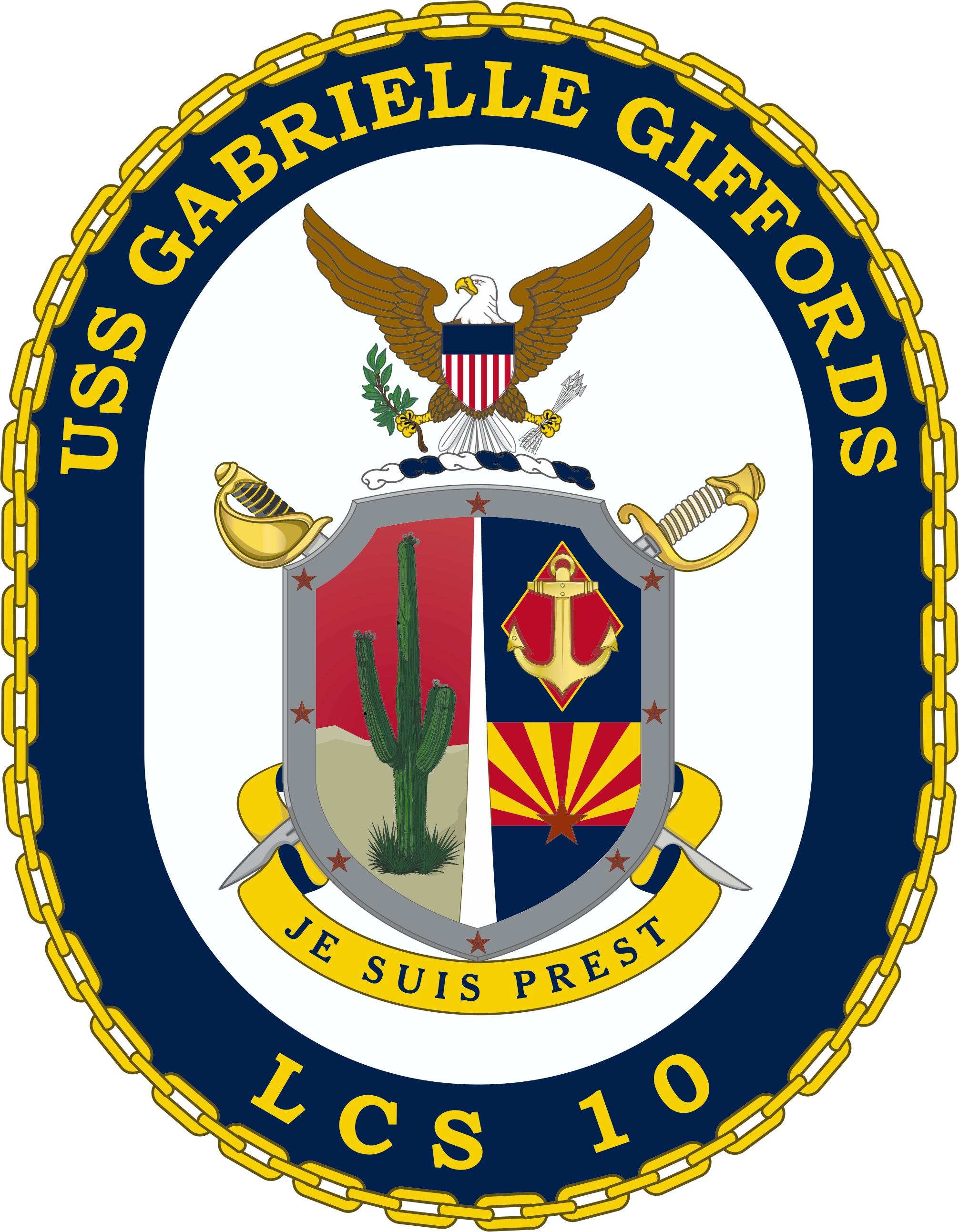
- Badge

General characteristics
- Class & type: Independence-class littoral combat ship
- Displacement: 2,307 tonnes light, 3,104 tonnes full, 797 tonnes deadweight
- Length: 127.4 m (418 ft)
- Beam: 31.6 m (104 ft)
- Draft: 14 ft (4.27 m)
- Propulsion: 2× gas turbines, 2× diesel, 4× waterjets, retractable Azimuth thruster, 4× diesel generators
- Speed: 40 kn + (46 mph; 74 km/h), 47 knots (54 mph; 87 km/h) sprint
- Range: 4,300 nmi (8,000 km; 4,900 mi) at 20 kn + (23 mph; 37 km/h)
- Capacity: 210 tonnes (230 short tons)
- Complement: 70, blue / gold 112 if single crewed.
- Sensors & processing systems: Sea Giraffe 3D Surface/Air RADAR; Bridgemaster-E Navigational RADAR; AN/KAX-2 EO/IR sensor for GFC
- Electronic warfare & decoys: EDO ES-3601 ESM; 4 × SRBOC Chaff and Decoy Launching System
- Armament: 1 × BAE Systems Mk 110 57 mm gun; 4 × .50 cal (12.7 mm) guns; 1 × SeaRAM 11-cell missile launcher; 1 x Mk.87 Mod 0 GMLS e/w 8 x RGM-184A Naval Strike Missiles; 2 x Mk44 Bushmaster II; Mission modules
- Aircraft carried: 2× MH-60R/S Seahawks

USS Gabrielle Giffords (LCS-10) is an Independence-class littoral combat ship of the United States Navy. The ship is named after former United States Representative Gabby Giffords, who was shot along with eighteen other people during a 2011 shooting in Tucson, Arizona. The ship's name was announced by then-Secretary of the Navy Ray Mabus on 10 February 2012. Gabrielle Giffords is the 16th U.S. naval ship to be named for a woman by the United States Navy, and the 13th U.S. naval ship since 1850 to be named after a living person.

Construction on Gabrielle Giffords began with her keel laying on 16 April 2014, at the Austal USA shipyard in Mobile, Alabama. Rep. Giffords, still recovering from injuries sustained in the 2011 assassination attempt, attended the ship's keel-laying ceremony, and with the assistance of an Austal welder, welded her initials into a plate that would become part of the ship's hull. Gabrielle Giffords was launched, and then moved from her construction facility to drydock, on 26 February 2015. The ship was christened in a ceremony held at the Austal USA shipyard on 13 June 2015, and Second Lady of the United States Jill Biden served as ship sponsor at the christening. The ship was delivered to the U.S. Navy on 23 December 2016, and commissioned the following spring on 10 June 2017, in Galveston, Texas.

== Background ==
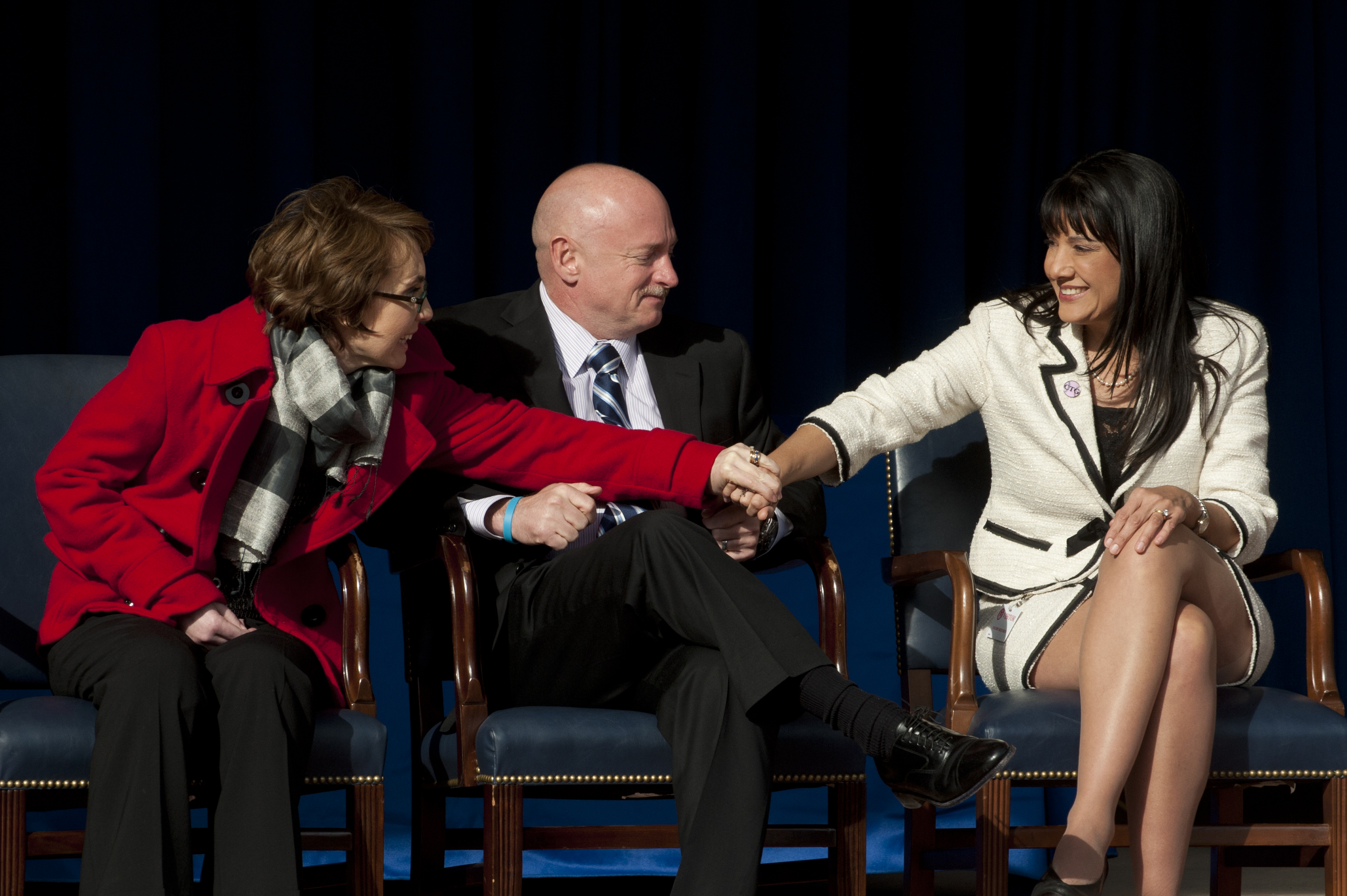
Former U.S. Rep. Gabrielle Giffords, left, and her husband, Mark Kelly, congratulate ship's sponsor Roxanna Green at a ceremony to announce the U.S. Navy's naming of the newest littoral combat ship

In 2002, the U.S. Navy initiated a program to develop the first of a fleet of littoral combat ships. The Navy initially ordered two trimaran hulled ships from General Dynamics, which became known as the Independence-class littoral combat ships after the first ship of the class, USS Independence. Even-numbered U.S. Navy littoral combat ships are built using the Independence-class trimaran design, while odd-numbered ships are based on a competing design, the conventional hull Freedom-class littoral combat ship. The initial order of littoral combat ships involved a total of four ships, including two of the Independence-class design.

On 29 December 2010, the Navy announced that it was awarding Austal USA a contract to build ten additional Independence-class littoral combat ships. On 10 February 2012, Naval Secretary Ray Mabus announced that LCS-10, the fifth Independence-class ship to be built, would be named USS Gabrielle Giffords. Secretary Mabus also announced that the ship's sponsor would be Roxanna Green, the mother of Christina-Taylor Green, age 9, who was killed in the Tucson shooting that wounded Giffords in January 2011.

=== Naming ===
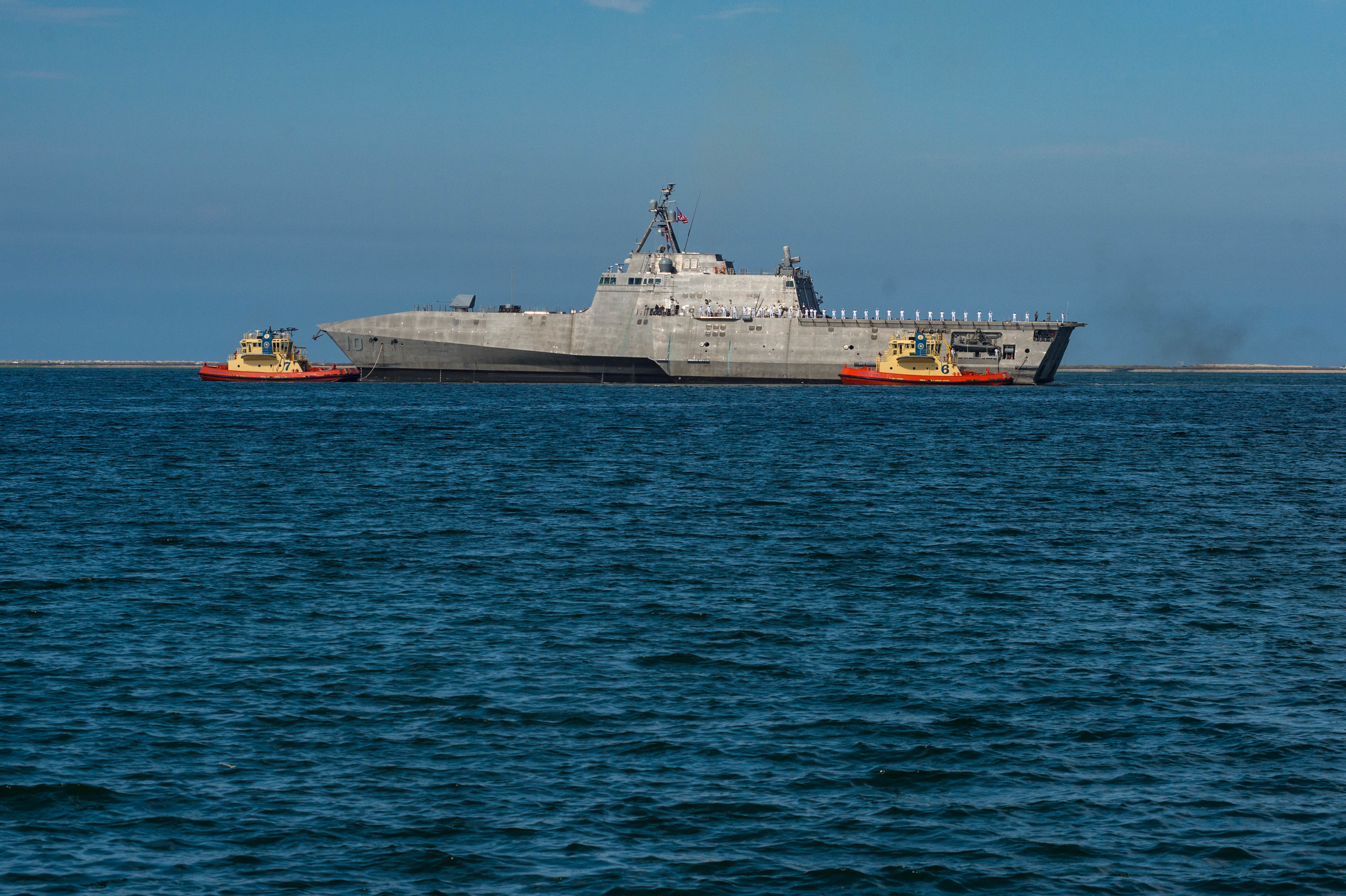
Gabrielle Giffords off San Diego on 5 July 2017

During the ship's naming announcement on 10 February 2012, Secretary Mabus said that the Navy had chosen to name the ship Gabrielle Giffords because Rep. Giffords' name had become "synonymous with courage" and that the congresswoman had "inspired the nation with remarkable resiliency." The secretary also called the naming a tribute to Navy families, stating that Giffords was a "Navy spouse" who made efforts to support the Navy during her time in Congress. Giffords is married to Captain Mark Kelly (Ret.), a former naval aviator and astronaut.

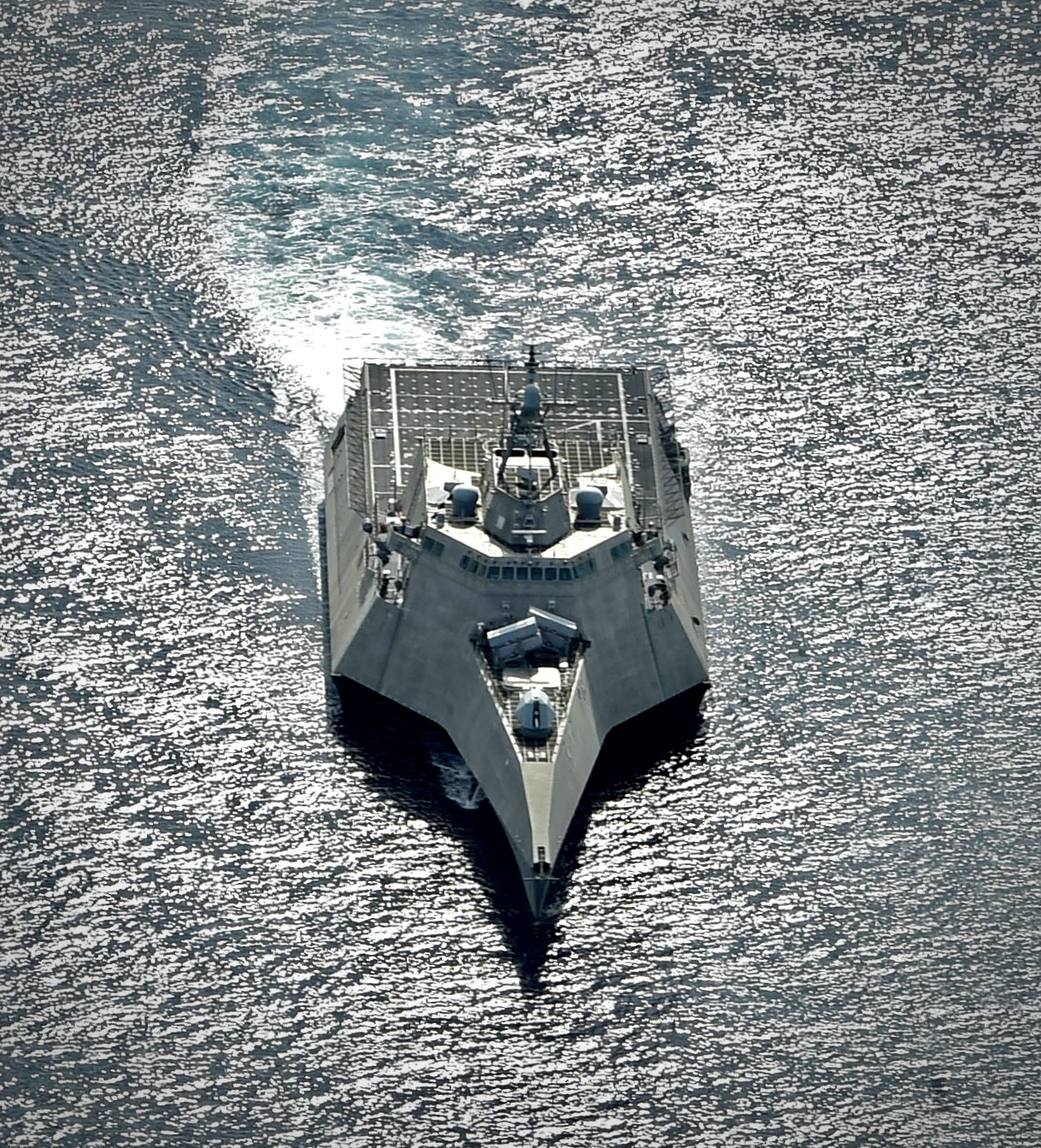
USS Gabrielle Giffords (LCS-10), on patrol in the South China Sea, June 2020

The media reported that some former military members, including retired U.S. Navy and U.S. Marine Corps officers, were criticizing the decision to name the ship after Giffords as part of a perceived trend toward naming ships for political reasons. Some commentators, including retired Commander Darlene Iskra, the first woman to command a U.S. Navy vessel, and Robert Farley, professor at the Patterson School of Diplomacy and International Commerce and military affairs scholar, noted in response that several ships in the US Navy, including Henry M. Jackson, Carl Vinson, John C. Stennis, Jimmy Carter, Ronald Reagan, and George Bush were named for prominent politicians who were still alive at the time of the naming. Commander Iskra also wrote in a Time magazine editorial that the still-active Carl Vinson was named for a congressman responsible for barring women from combat roles in the Navy for nearly 50 years.

In connection with the controversy, United States Senator Roy Blunt added an amendment to the 2012 National Defense Authorization Act which required the Navy to report to Congress on how effectively it was adhering to established naming conventions. The resulting report highlighted a consistent record of making "occasional exceptions" to established ship-naming conventions, beginning in 1798 when Secretary Benjamin Stoddert broke with naming convention by naming one of the original six frigates of the United States Navy as USS Chesapeake. The report also noted that while Secretary Mabus considered honoring Giffords and other victims of the Tucson shooting by naming LCS-10 after the Arizonan city of Tucson, consistent with current naming conventions for littoral combat ships to honor U.S. cities, this was not possible because USS Tucson, an active Los Angeles-class submarine, currently bears the name.

After the ship's 2015 christening, military-focused newspaper Stars and Stripes said that criticism of the ship's naming had become "muted", possibly due to recognition that the ship's naming was "by no means unprecedented."

== Design ==
In 2002, the United States Navy initiated a program to develop the first of a fleet of littoral combat ships. The Navy initially ordered two trimaran hulled ships from General Dynamics, which became known as the Independence-class littoral combat ship after the first ship of the class, USS Independence (LCS-2). Even-numbered U.S. Navy littoral combat ships are built using the Independence-class trimaran design, while odd-numbered ships are based on a competing design, the conventional monohull Freedom-class littoral combat ship. The initial order of littoral combat ships involved a total of four ships, including two of the Independence-class design. On 29 December 2010, the Navy announced that it was awarding Austal USA a contract to build ten additional Independence-class littoral combat ships.

== Construction and career ==
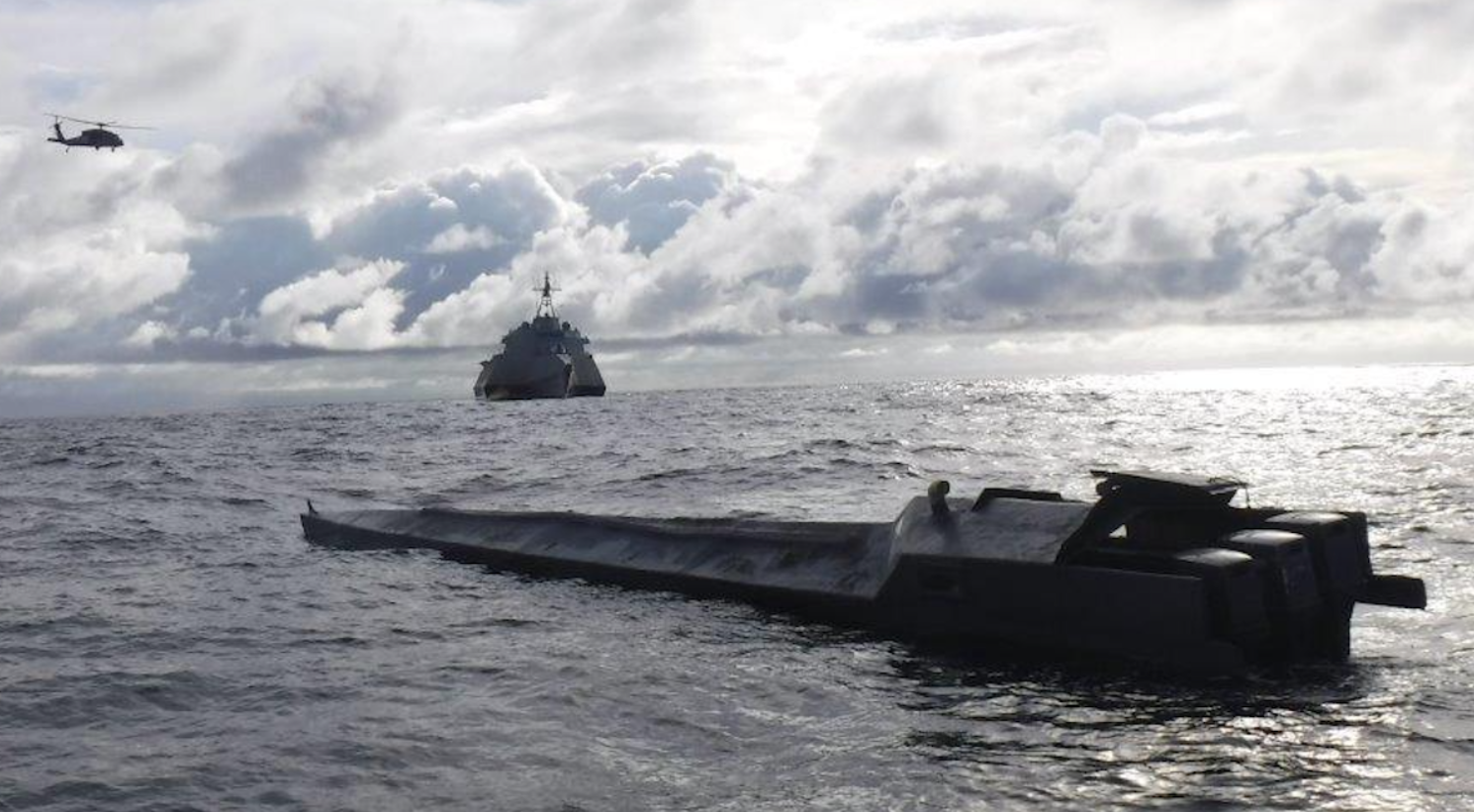
USS Gabrielle Giffords (LCS-10) intercepts a narco-submarine in the eastern Pacific Ocean (December 2020)

After commissioning, Gabrielle Giffords conducted qualification trials on her official maiden voyage from Texas to her home port of San Diego, California via the Panama Canal, arriving at Naval Base San Diego on 5 July 2017. She has been assigned to Littoral Combat Ship Squadron One.

During summer 2019 the ship was equipped with MQ-8C Fire Scout drones and Naval Strike Missiles and from September deployed in an offensive role in the seas off China. She returned to San Diego in January 2021.

Gabrielle Giffords departed Naval Base San Diego on June 23, 2025, and arrived at her new homeport of Seattle on June 28, 2025, following an 18-month rotational deployment to the U.S. 7th Fleet area of operations.
