= Caledonia, Arkansas =

- Unincorporated community
- Location within Arkansas Location within the United States
- Coordinates: 33°03′20″N 92°39′14″W
- Country: United States
- State: Arkansas
- County: Union
- Elevation: 210 ft (64 m)
- Time zone: UTC-6 (Central (CST))
  - Summer (DST): UTC-5 (CDT)
- Area code: 870
- GNIS feature ID: 57490

Caledonia is an unincorporated community in Union County, Arkansas, United States.

== History ==
John L. Canley (1938–2022), United States Marine Corps Sergeant Major and recipient of the Medal of Honor, was born in Caledonia.
