= M Street Bridge =

M Street Bridge may refer to:

- M Street Bridge (Sacramento, California), also known as Tower Bridge
- M Street Bridge (Washington, D.C.)

== See also ==
- M Street (disambiguation)
