= John L. Canley =

U.S. Marine and Medal of Honor recipient (1937–2022)

John Canley
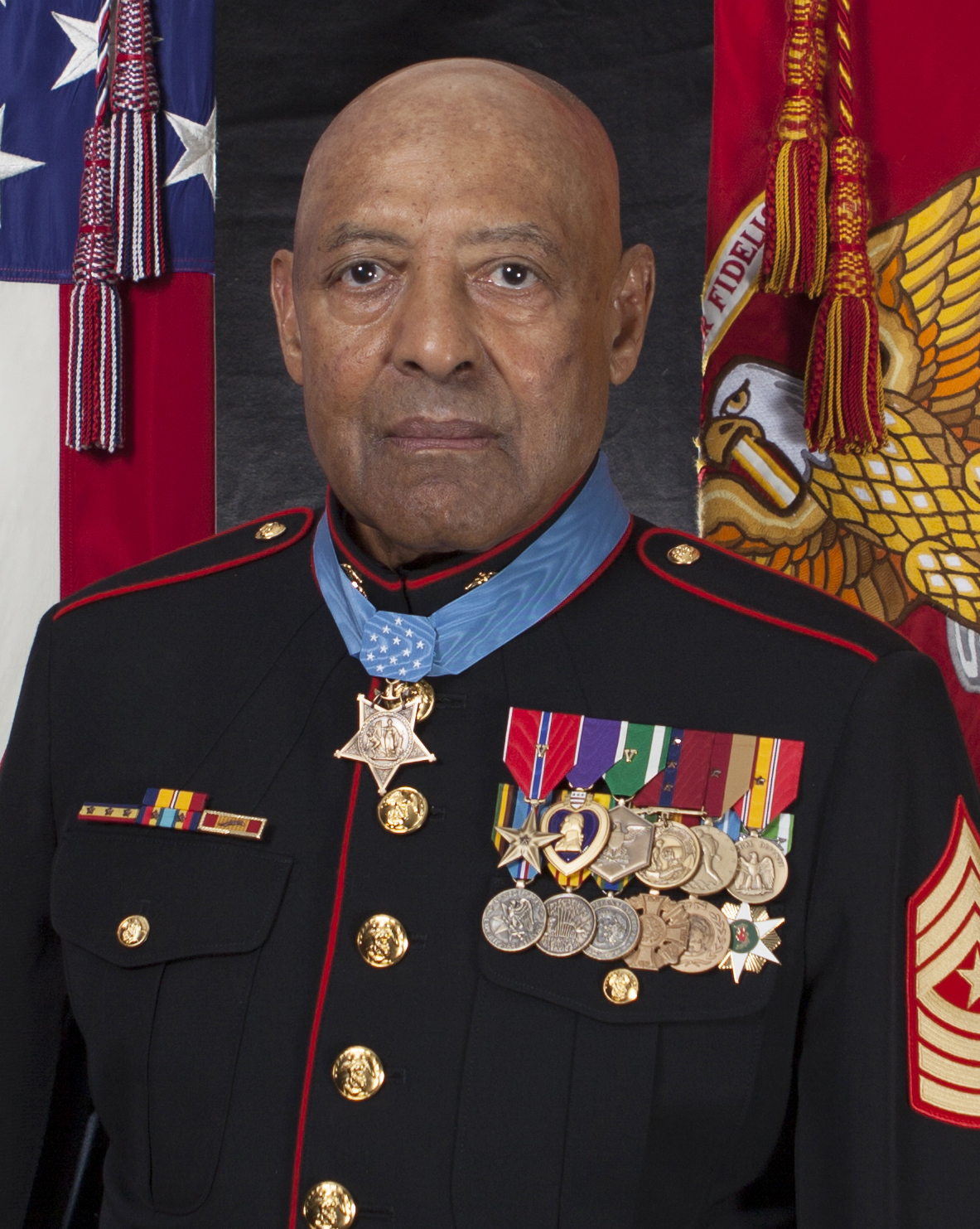
- Canley in 2018
- Born: 20 December 1937; Caledonia, Arkansas, U.S.
- Died: May 11, 2022 (aged 84); Bend, Oregon, U.S.
- Burial place: Arlington National Cemetery
- Military career
- Allegiance: United States
- Branch: United States Marine Corps
- Service years: 1953–1981
- Rank: Sergeant major
- Unit: 1st Battalion, 1st Marines
- Conflicts: Vietnam War; Con Thien; Battle of Huế
- Awards: Medal of Honor; Bronze Star Medal with "V" device Purple Heart; Navy and Marine Corps Commendation Medal with "V" device

John Lee Canley (20 December 1937 – 11 May 2022) was a United States Marine and a recipient of the United States military's highest award for valor, the Medal of Honor, for his actions in January/February 1968 during the Battle of Huế. At the time of this action Canley was a gunnery sergeant with Company A, 1st Battalion, 1st Marines. Canley was originally awarded the Navy Cross but this was upgraded to the Medal of Honor, which was presented on 17 October 2018. The Expeditionary Sea Base USS John L. Canley (ESB-6) is named for him.

== Early life ==
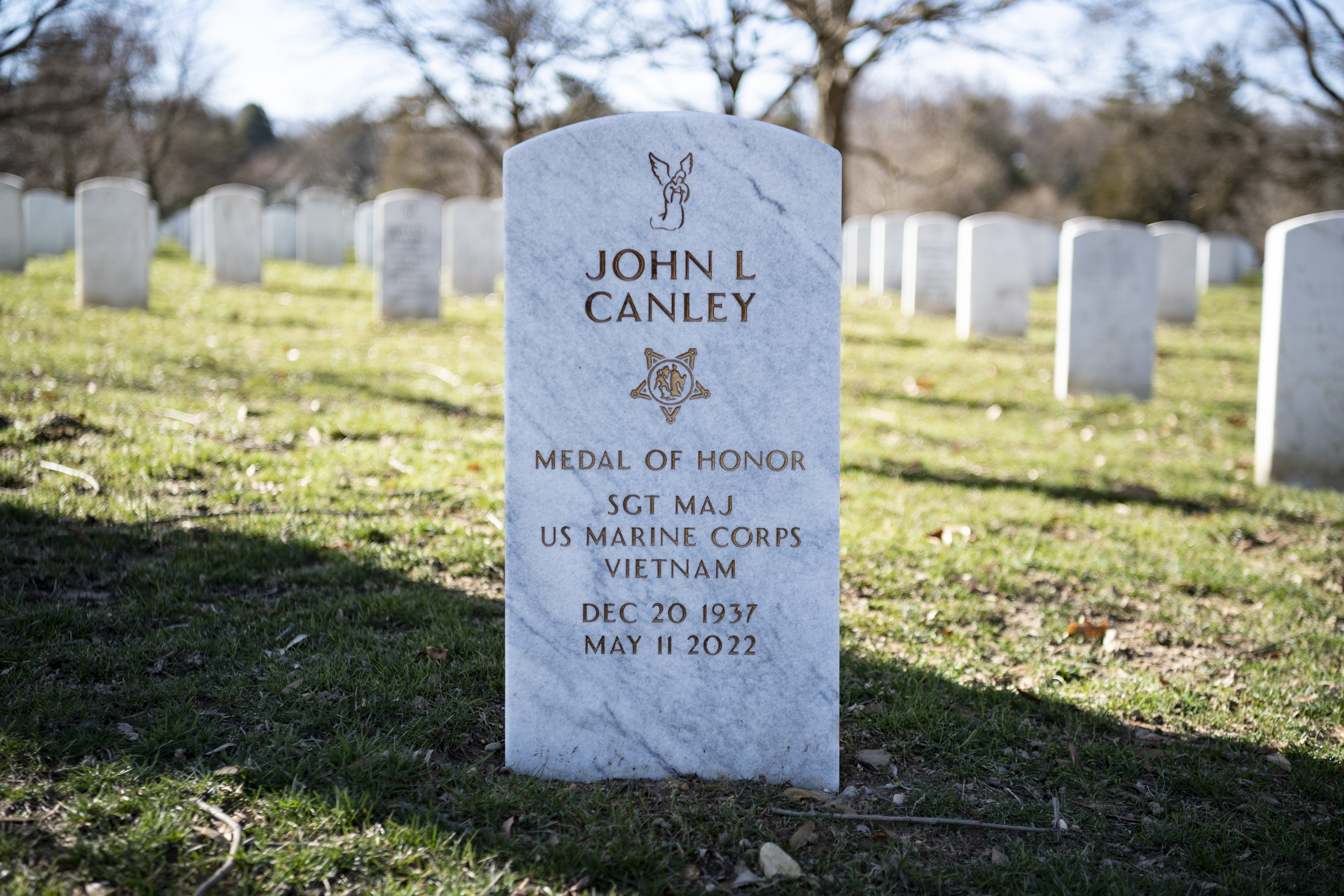
Grave at Arlington National Cemetery

Canley was born in Caledonia, Arkansas, on 20 December 1937. His father was employed at a chemical plant; his mother worked as a restaurant manager. Canley was raised in nearby El Dorado. In 1953, he enlisted in the United States Marine Corps from Little Rock, Arkansas. He retired in 1981.

== Military career ==
On the morning of 31 January 1968, Company A, 1st Battalion, 1st Marines was loaded onto trucks and sent to reinforce United States and South Vietnamese forces under siege in Huế. As the convoy approached the southern suburbs of the city, they began to come under increased sniper fire. In one village, the troops dismounted and cleared the houses on either side of the main street before proceeding. The Marine convoy stopped several times to eliminate resistance in heavy house-to-house and street-to-street fighting before proceeding again. During this fighting the company commander, Captain Gordon Batcheller, was wounded. Gunnery Sergeant Canley assumed command of the company, and he and Sergeant Alfredo Cantu Gonzalez led the Marines in the defense of the convoy, actions for which Gonzalez would later be posthumously awarded the Medal of Honor. At about 15:15 after bloody fighting the Marines managed to make their way toward the besieged Military Assistance Command Vietnam (MACV) compound (16°27′58″N 107°35′31″E). Canley was awarded the Navy Cross in 1970.

Canley retired from the Marine Corps on 23 October 1981.

=== Medal of Honor ===
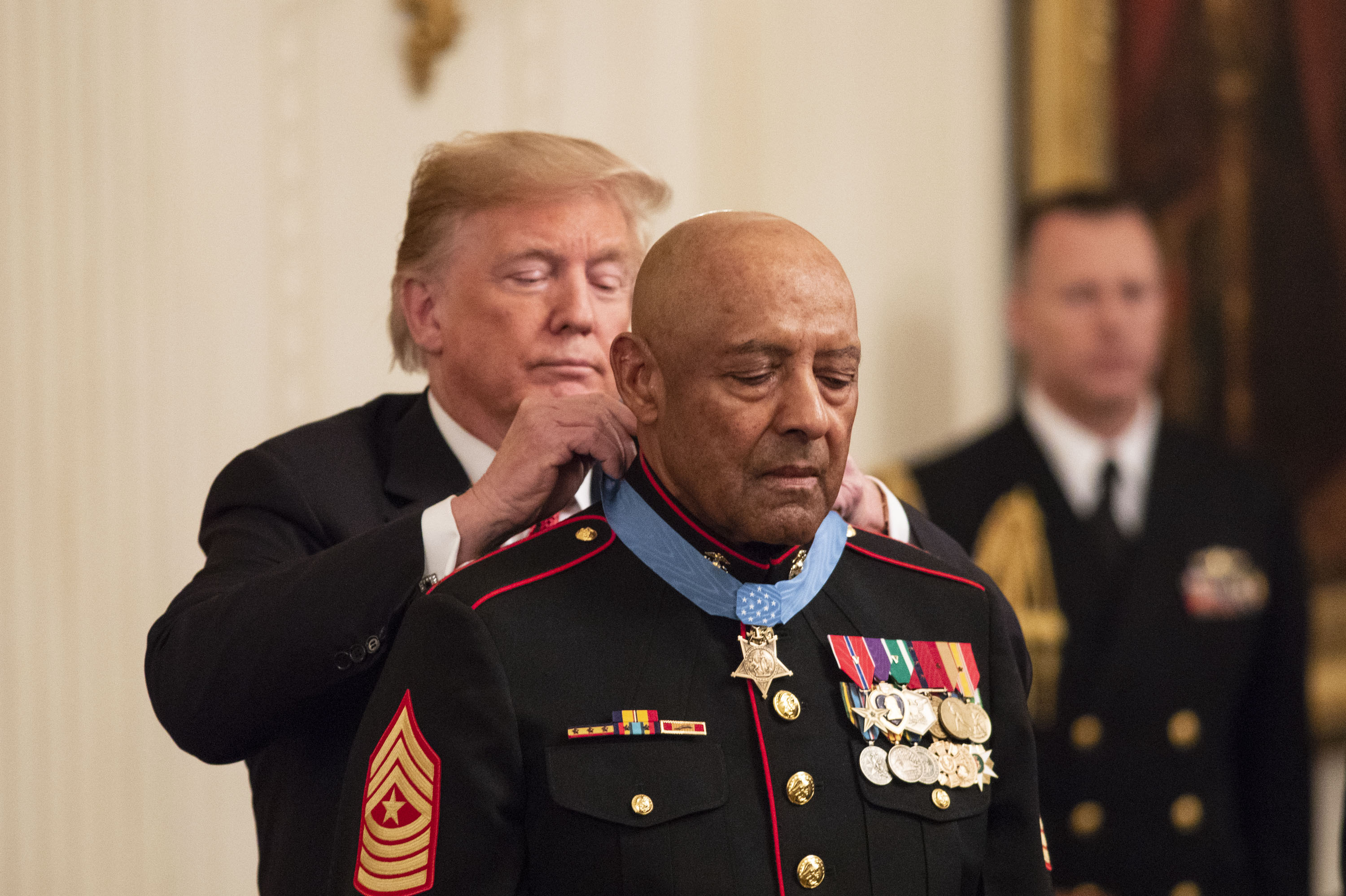
President Trump presenting the Medal of Honor to Canley

Representative Julia Brownley sponsored a private bill in Congress for Canley's Navy Cross to be upgraded to the Medal of Honor. On 21 December 2017, the House of Representatives waived the five-year time limit for the award of the Medal of Honor, and the Senate later took similar action. Secretary of Defense Jim Mattis recommended the upgrade to President Donald Trump, who approved the award in July 2018. On Wednesday, 17 October 2018, Trump awarded the Medal of Honor to Canley.

=== USS John L. Canley ===
On 22 June 2022, five weeks after Canley's death, the Expeditionary Sea Base USS John L. Canley (ESB-6) was christened at a shipyard in San Diego. His daughter Patricia Sargent performed the christening of the 784-foot (239 m) ship.

== Personal life ==
Canley was married to Viktoria Fenech. Together, they had one child (Patricia), as well as a stepson (David) from Fenech's previous relationship. They eventually divorced. He also had two children with Toyo Adaniya Russeau: Ricky and Yukari. After retiring from the Marine Corps, Canley resided in Oxnard, California.

Canley died on 11 May 2022, at his daughter's home in Bend, Oregon. He was 84, and suffered from cancer prior to his death.

== Medal of Honor citation ==
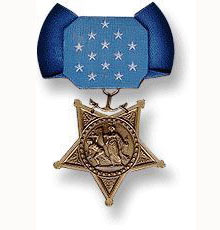

The President of the United States of America, authorized by Act of Congress, March 3, 1863, has awarded in the name of Congress the Medal of Honor to

GUNNERY SERGEANT
JOHN CANLEY
UNITED STATES MARINE CORPS

For conspicuous gallantry and intrepidity at the risk of his life above and beyond the call of duty in action against the enemy while serving as Company Gunnery Sergeant, Company A, First Battalion, First Marines, First Marine Division from 31 January to 6 February 1968, in the Republic of Vietnam. Company A fought off multiple vicious attacks as it rapidly moved along the highway toward Hue City to relieve friendly forces that were surrounded by enemy forces. Despite being wounded in these engagements, Gunnery Sergeant Canley repeatedly rushed across fire-swept terrain to carry his wounded Marines to safety. After his commanding officer was severely wounded, Gunnery Sergeant Canley took command and led the company into Hue City. At Hue City, caught in deadly crossfire from enemy machine gun positions, he set up a base of fire and maneuvered with a platoon in a flanking attack that eliminated several enemy positions. Retaining command of the company for three days, he led attacks against multiple enemy fortified positions while routinely braving enemy fire to carry wounded Marines to safety. On 4 February, he led a group of Marines into an enemy-occupied building in Hue City. He moved into the open to draw fire, located the enemy, eliminated the threat, and expanded the company’s hold on the building room by room. Gunnery Sergeant Canley then gained position above the enemy strongpoint and dropped in a large satchel charge that forced the enemy to withdraw. On 6 February, during a fierce firefight at a hospital compound, Gunnery Sergeant Canley twice scaled a wall in full view of the enemy to carry wounded Marines to safety. By his undaunted courage, selfless sacrifice, and unwavering devotion to duty, Gunnery Sergeant Canley reflected great credit upon himself and upheld the highest traditions of the Marine Corps and the United States Naval Service.

== Awards and decorations ==

1st row	Medal of Honor			
2nd row	Bronze Star Medal with Combat Distinguishing Device	Purple Heart	Navy and Marine Corps Commendation Medal with Combat Distinguishing Device	Combat Action Ribbon
3rd row	Navy Presidential Unit Citation with three bronze service stars	Marine Corps Good Conduct Medal with seven service stars	Marine Corps Expeditionary Medal with one service star	National Defense Service Medal with one service star
4th row	Armed Forces Expeditionary Medal	Vietnam Service Medal with nine service stars	Korea Defense Service Medal	Navy Sea Service Deployment Ribbon with two service stars
5th row	Vietnam Gallantry Cross with two Silver Stars	Vietnam Gallantry Cross Unit Citation	United Nations Medal	Vietnam Campaign Medal
Badges	Rifle expert marksmanship badge (11 awards)		Pistol expert marksmanship badge (16 awards)	

== See also ==
- List of Medal of Honor recipients for the Vietnam War
