= USS Kyle Carpenter =

Future US Navy destroyer

History

United States
- Name: Kyle Carpenter
- Namesake: Kyle Carpenter
- Builder: Bath Iron Works
- Identification: Hull number: DDG-148
- Status: Authorized for construction

General characteristics
- Class & type: Arleigh Burke-class destroyer
- Displacement: 9,217 tons (full load)
- Length: 510 ft (160 m)
- Beam: 66 ft (20 m)
- Propulsion: 4 × General Electric LM2500 gas turbines 100,000 shp (75,000 kW)
- Speed: 31 knots (57 km/h; 36 mph)
- Complement: 380 officers and enlisted
- Armament: Guns: 1 × 5-inch (127 mm)/62 Mk 45 Mod 4 (lightweight gun); 1 × 20 mm (0.8 in) Phalanx CIWS; 2 × 25 mm (0.98 in) Mk 38 machine gun system; 4 × 0.50 in (12.7 mm) caliber guns; Missiles: 1 × 32-cell, 1 × 64-cell (96 total cells) Mk 41 vertical launching system (VLS): RIM-66M surface-to-air missile; RIM-156 surface-to-air missile; RIM-174A Standard ERAM; RIM-161 anti-ballistic missile; RIM-162 ESSM (quad-packed); BGM-109 Tomahawk cruise missile; RUM-139 vertical launch ASROC; Torpedoes: 2 × Mark 32 triple torpedo tubes: Mark 46 lightweight torpedo; Mark 50 lightweight torpedo; Mark 54 lightweight torpedo
- Armor: Kevlar-type armor with steel hull. Numerous passive survivability measures.
- Aircraft carried: 2 × MH-60R Seahawk helicopters
- Aviation facilities: Double hangar and helipad

USS Kyle Carpenter (DDG-148) is the planned 98th Arleigh Burke-class (Flight III) Aegis guided missile destroyer of the United States Navy. She is named for United States marine Kyle Carpenter, the youngest living Medal of Honor recipient at the time the ship was named, for his actions in Marjah, Helmand Province, Afghanistan, in 2010.

== Design and construction ==
In January 2025, the Secretary of the Navy announced that an Arleigh Burke-class guided-missile destroyer would be named USS Kyle Carpenter, to be built by General Dynamics Bath Iron Works.
