= USS John L. Canley =

US Navy expeditionary mobile base vessel

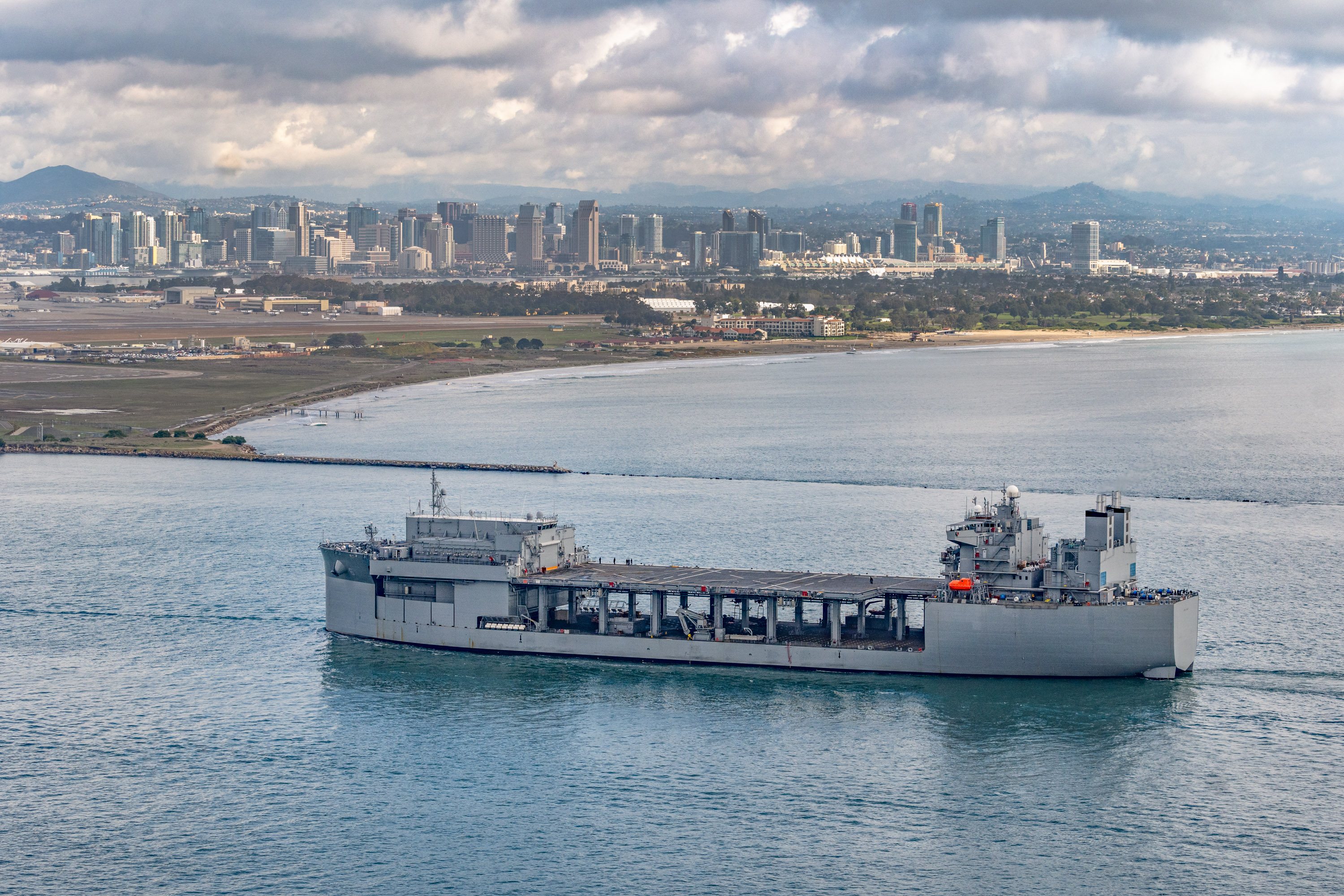
- USS John L. Canley (ESB-6), 9 February 2024

History

United States
- Name: John L. Canley
- Awarded: 23 August 2019
- Builder: NASSCO – San Diego, California
- Laid down: 16 November 2020 (keel laid down); 30 April 2022 (keel authentication ceremony)
- Sponsored by: Patricia Sargent
- Christened: 25 June 2022
- Acquired: 1 March 2023
- Commissioned: 17 February 2024
- Motto: Courage Under Fire
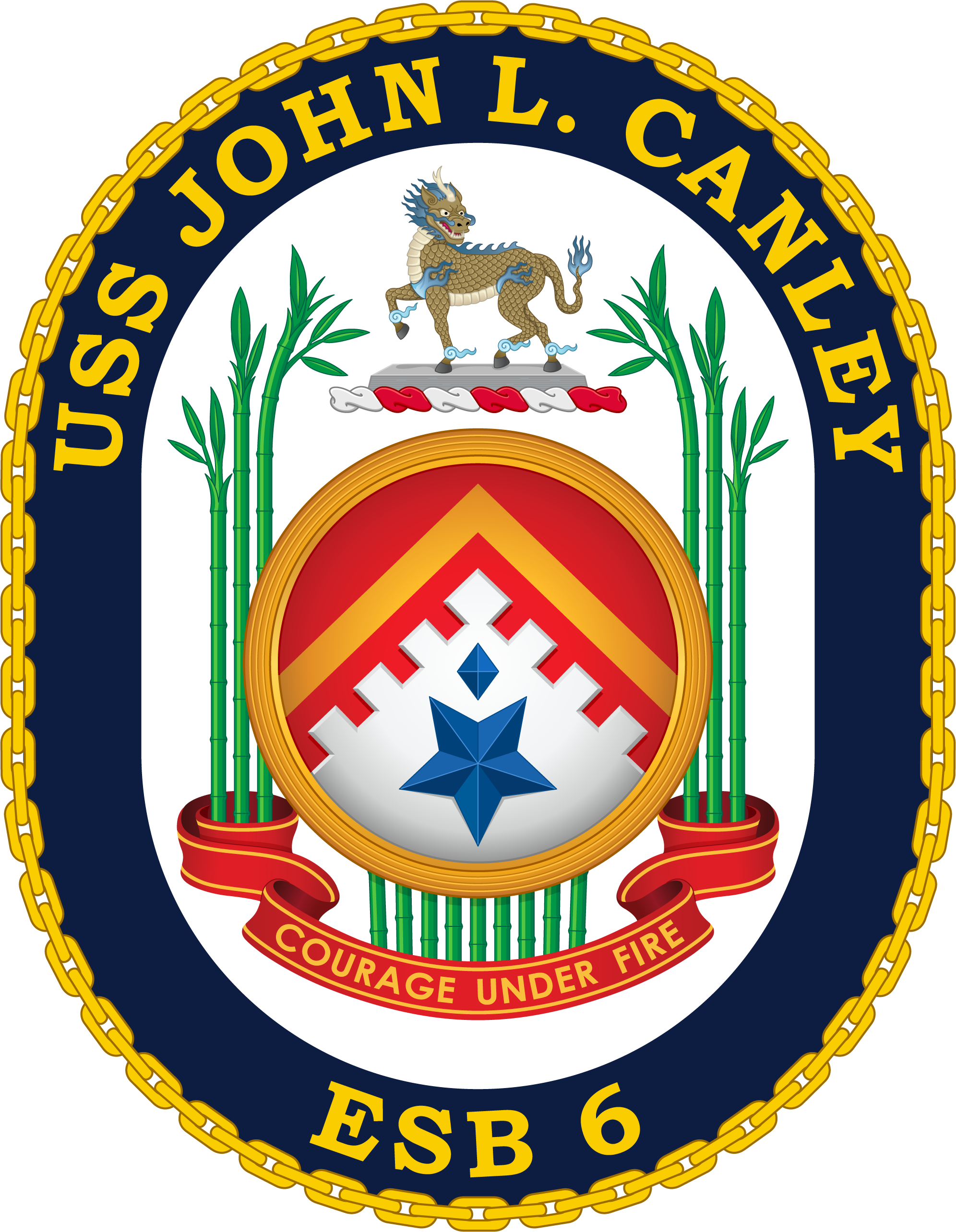
- Badge

General characteristics
- Class & type: Expeditionary Mobile Base
- Length: 784 ft (239 m)
- Complement: 19 officers, 231 enlisted
- Sensors & processing systems: SEA GIRAFFE AMB
- Aircraft carried: MH-53 and MH-60 helicopters

USS John L. Canley (ESB-6) is the fourth Lewis B. Puller-class expeditionary mobile base (ESB) of the United States Navy, and the first ship to be named for Medal of Honor recipient John L. Canley. John L. Canley was constructed in San Diego, California by the National Steel and Shipbuilding Company (NASSCO). Like her sister ships, she is also a sub-variant of the Montford Point-class expeditionary transfer dock (ESD). The ESDs are operated by the Navy's Military Sealift Command with predominantly civilian crews, while the ESBs, owing to the nature of their operations, have been commissioned and are operated directly by the Navy with military personnel.

Although without any ceremony at the time, the keel for the ship was laid at the NASSCO shipyard in San Diego on 16 November 2020. On 30 April 2022, an official ceremony was held. The ship was christened at the shipyard by Canley's daughter and ship's sponsor Patricia Sargent on 25 June 2022, just five weeks after Canley's death.
