= Kyle Carpenter =

United States Marine (born 1989)

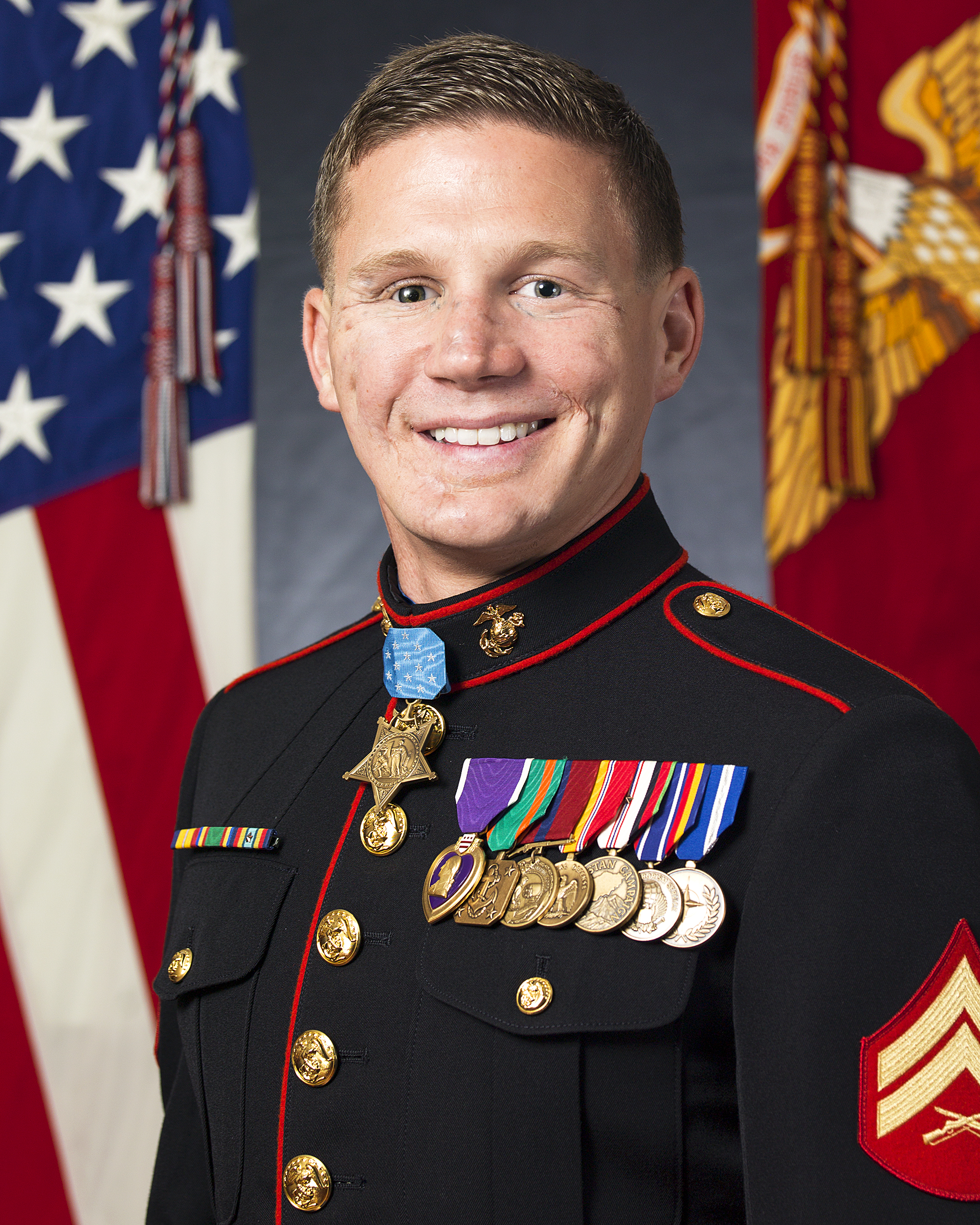
- Official portrait, 2014
- Born: William Kyle Carpenter; October 17, 1989 (age 37); Jackson, Mississippi, U.S.
- Education: University of South Carolina (BA)
- Military career
- Allegiance: United States
- Branch: United States Marine Corps
- Service years: 2009–2013
- Rank: Corporal
- Units: Fox Company, 2nd Battalion, 9th Marines
- Conflicts: War in Afghanistan; Helmand province campaign; Operation Moshtarak (WIA)
- Awards: Medal of Honor; Purple Heart; Navy Achievement Medal

William Kyle Carpenter (born October 17, 1989) is a medically retired United States Marine Corps corporal who was awarded the United States' highest military honor, the Medal of Honor, for his actions in Marjah, Helmand Province, Afghanistan, in 2010. Carpenter is the youngest living Medal of Honor recipient.

== Early life ==
Carpenter was born in Jackson, Mississippi, on October 17, 1989, and raised in Flowood by his parents James and Robin. He is a graduate of W.W. King Academy in Batesburg, South Carolina. He enlisted in the Marine Corps' delayed entry program at age 19 in February 2009, and completed Recruit Training in July 2009 at Marine Corps Recruit Depot Parris Island in South Carolina.

== Military career ==
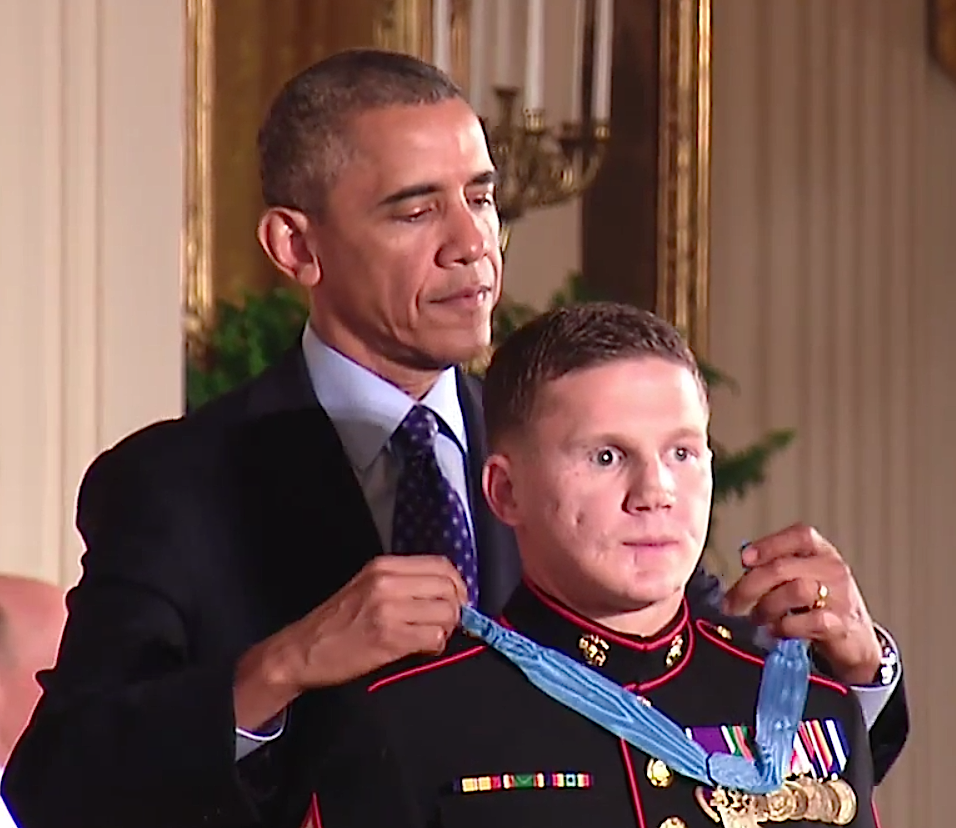
Carpenter receiving the Medal of Honor from President Barack Obama, June 19, 2014

Carpenter completed his initial training at the Camp Geiger School of Infantry, Marine Corps Base Camp Lejeune, North Carolina. In July 2010, as a Private First Class, he was assigned to Fox Company, 2nd Battalion, 9th Marines, Regimental Combat Team One, 1st Marine Division (Forward), 1st Marine Expeditionary Force (Forward), in Helmand Province, Afghanistan, in support of Operation Enduring Freedom, where he served as a Squad Automatic Weapon (SAW) gunner beginning September 2009.

On November 21, 2010, Carpenter and another Marine, Nick Eufrazio, were manning a rooftop security post during defense of the village of Marjah, Helmand Province, from a Taliban attack. According to his Medal of Honor citation,

The enemy initiated a daylight attack with hand grenades, one of which landed inside their sandbagged position. Without hesitation and with complete disregard for his own safety, Lance Corporal Carpenter moved toward the grenade in an attempt to shield his fellow Marine from the deadly blast. When the grenade detonated, his body absorbed the brunt of the blast, severely wounding him, but saving the life of his fellow Marine.

Carpenter's jaw and right arm were shattered, he lost his right eye, most of his teeth and has undergone dozens of surgeries. In July 2013, he was medically retired as a Corporal.

On June 19, 2014, Carpenter received the Medal of Honor in a ceremony at the White House. He is the eighth living recipient to be awarded the Medal of Honor for actions in Afghanistan.

== Medal of Honor citation ==
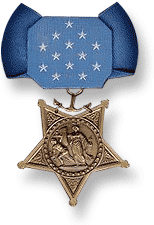

The president of the United States, in the name of the congress, takes pleasure in presenting the Medal of Honor to Lance Corporal William "Kyle" Carpenter, United States Marine Corps, For conspicuous gallantry and intrepidity at the risk of his life above and beyond the call of duty while serving as an Automatic Rifleman with Company F, 2d Battalion, 9th Marines, Regimental Combat Team 1, 1st Marine Division (Forward), 1 Marine Expeditionary Force (Forward), in Helmand Province, Afghanistan in support of Operation Enduring Freedom on 21 November 2010. Lance Corporal Carpenter was a member of a platoon-sized coalition force, comprised of two reinforced Marine squads partnered with an Afghan National Army squad. The platoon had established Patrol Base Dakota two days earlier in a small village in the Marjah District in order to disrupt enemy activity and provide security for the local Afghan population. Lance Corporal Carpenter and a fellow Marine were manning a rooftop security position on the perimeter of Patrol Base Dakota when the enemy initiated a daylight attack with hand grenades, one of which landed inside their sandbagged position. Without hesitation, and with complete disregard for his own safety, Lance Corporal Carpenter moved toward the grenade in an attempt to shield his fellow Marine from the deadly blast. When the grenade detonated, his body absorbed the brunt of the blast, severely wounding him, but saving the life of his fellow Marine. By his undaunted courage, bold fighting spirit, and unwavering devotion to duty in the face of almost certain death, Lance Corporal Carpenter reflected great credit upon himself and upheld the highest traditions of the Marine Corps and the United States Naval Service.

== Post-military career ==
After his July 2013 medical retirement, Carpenter enrolled at the University of South Carolina in Columbia, and received a degree in international studies in 2017. He is a 2013 initiate of the Chi-Omega chapter of Kappa Sigma fraternity at University of South Carolina.

In 2019, Carpenter co-authored a book with Don Yaeger titled You Are Worth It: Building a Life Worth Fighting For about the events leading up to his becoming a Medal of Honor recipient.

In 2023, the US Army Engineer Research and Development Center unveiled a new high-performance computing cluster named Carpenter, in honor of Kyle Carpenter.

In January 2025, outgoing secretary of the Navy Carlos Del Toro announced that the 98th Arleigh Burke-class destroyer, DDG-148, would be named USS Kyle Carpenter in his honor. At just 35 years old at the time, Carpenter is one of the youngest living Americans to have a warship named for him.

== Awards and decorations ==
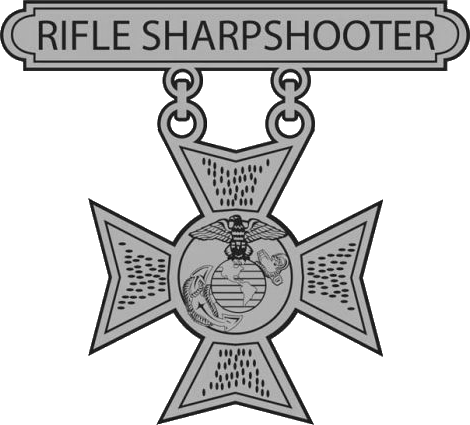

1st Row	Medal of Honor		Purple Heart
2nd Row	Navy and Marine Corps Achievement Medal	Combat Action Ribbon	Navy Unit Commendation
3rd Row	Marine Corps Good Conduct Medal	National Defense Service Medal	Afghanistan Campaign Medal with 1 campaign star
4th Row	Global War on Terrorism Service Medal	Navy Sea Service Deployment Ribbon with 1 service star	NATO Service Medal for service with ISAF
Badge	Sharpshooter marksmanship badge for rifle		

1 Service stripe

== Fundraising ==
Carpenter appeared in a video, "Still in the Fight," to raise money for the Fisher House Foundation, which provides free and low-cost housing to veterans and families receiving treatment at military hospitals.

== See also ==
- List of post-Vietnam Medal of Honor recipients
