= M Street =

M Street or "M" Street is the thirteenth of a sequence of alphabetical streets in many cities (or the twelfth if "I" or "J" is omitted).

It may refer to:

- M Street (Washington, D.C.) (3 such streets)
- Greenland Hills, Dallas, also known as M Streets
- M. Street, South Korean music group

== See also ==
- M Street Bridge (disambiguation), regarding M Streets in Sacramento, California, and in Washington, D.C.
- M Street High School, Washington, D.C.
