= USS Van Buren (1839) =

United States schooner

History

U.S.
- Name: USS Van Buren
- Namesake: Martin Van Buren
- Ordered: 26 June 1839
- Commissioned: 2 December 1839
- Decommissioned: 1 June 1847
- Fate: Sold for $1,200 on 1 June 1847

General characteristics
- Class & type: Schooner
- Tonnage: 112
- Length: 73 ft 4 in (22.35 m)
- Beam: 20 ft 2 in (6.15 m)
- Depth of hold: 7 ft 4 in (2.24 m)
- Armament: 4 12-pounder guns

USS Van Buren was a schooner that served as part of the United States Revenue Cutter Service. The ship was named after Martin Van Buren, the eighth president of the U.S. The ship was commissioned and set sail on 2 December 1839, and served a regular tour of duty with the Revenue Service. During the Second Seminole War, the ship was transferred to the United States Navy, and served as a support ship to troops along the coasts of Florida's rivers.

After being transferred back to the control of the Secretary of the Treasury, the Van Buren began to sail out of its homeport of Charleston, South Carolina. Still under the command of the Revenue Cutter Service, the ship participated in the Mexican–American War, first in the Gulf of Mexico, and later as a member of a squadron under the command of Captain John A. Webster. With the squadron, the Van Buren aided in a blockade off the coast of Veracruz. On 4 October 1846, the ship's crew had the Van Buren declared unseaworthy. It was decommissioned, and then sold for $1,200 on 1 June 1847.

== Career ==
=== United States Revenue Cutter Service ===
The ship's construction was approved on 26 June 1839; she was laid out in 1839 in Baltimore, Maryland, and reported fully constructed and ready for sailing on 29 November of the same year. The ship was commissioned a few days later, and entered the service of the Revenue Cutter Service on 2 December 1839. The ship performed the regular duties of ships in the Revenue Cutter Service between 1839 and 1840, but few records exist about its specific activities during this period. The commander of the vessel during this time was First Lieutenant John McGowan of the United States Revenue Marines.

=== Second Seminole War ===
When the Second Seminole War began in 1835, the Secretary of the Navy Mahlon Dickerson wrote Thomas Ewing, the United States Secretary of the Treasury at the time for command over a number of Revenue Cutter Vessels; the Van Buren was among them. The vessel became part of the Mosquito Fleet of Lieutenant Thomas T. McLaughlin. The ship served as a river vessel, mainly supporting the United States Army forces battling the Seminole on land.

=== Mexican–American War ===
After a year in the war, the Van Buren anchored in Norfolk, Virginia, on 23 July 1842, where it reentered the Revenue Cutter Service. It was formally transferred back on 18 August 1842. The Van Buren operated out of the port of Charleston, South Carolina for three years, undergoing repairs once at Baltimore, Maryland from May through June 1844. Following the outbreak of the Mexican–American War in 1846, Robert J. Walker, Secretary of the Treasury, ordered the Van Buren to the Gulf of Mexico. Under the command of Captain Thomas C. Rudolph of the United States Revenue Marines, the vessel sailed with three months' worth of ammunition and supplies to report to the Customs Collector of the Port of New Orleans; however, on its way to the port, the lightning struck the royal mast, forcing the ship back to Charleston. On 2 June 1846, the ship set sail again.

On 30 July 1846, the Van Buren set to harbor in Belize, where it joined the United States Revenue Marines squadron of Captain John A. Webster and aided in a blockade of Mexico's eastern coast. The Van Buren in particular was stationed off the coast of Veracruz. On 4 October, the Van Buren was declared unseaworthy, and ordered to New York on 11 November 1846. She was decommissioned and sold on 1 June 1847 for $1,200.
