= List of U.S. military vessels named after presidents =

These are vessels named for presidents of the United States of America (in order of their presidency and ship's commissioning):

== Ships named for one president ==
- George Washington has had several vessels named after him before he died in 1799, including at least four in the 1770s and one in 1798, one in 1814 as well as an armored cruiser, a submarine and an aircraft carrier in the 20th century. (See also USS Washington).
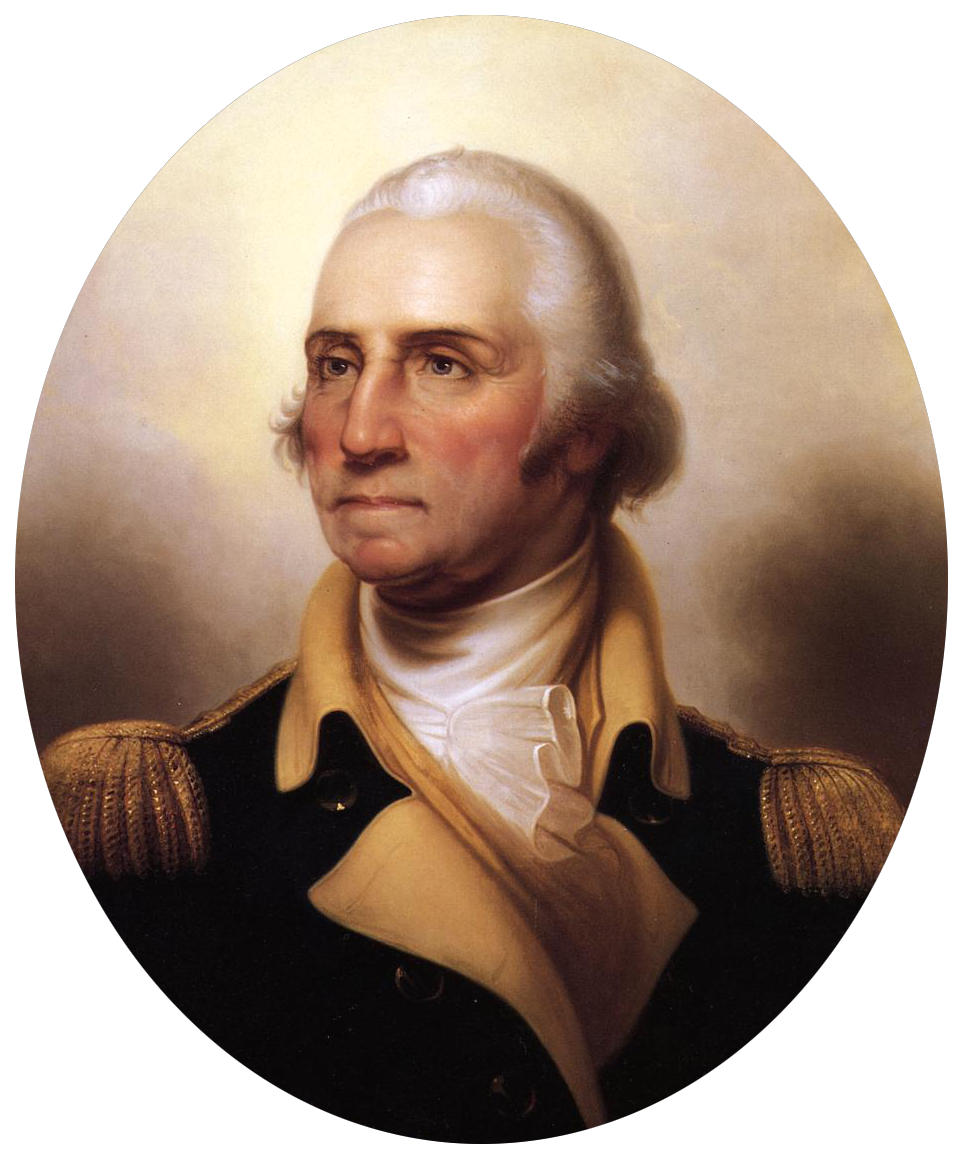
  George Washington
  - USS Washington (1775) was a schooner named Endeavor acquired by Gen. Washington in October 1775, renamed Washington, and re-rigged as a brigantine.
  - USS Washington (1776) was a row galley that operated in Narragansett Bay during the winter and spring of 1776.
  - USS Washington (1776) was one of 13 frigates authorized by the Continental Congress. She was launched in August 1776. Destroyed prior to commissioning.
  - USS Washington (1776), a lateen-rigged two-masted galley, was built in the autumn of 1776.
  - USS George Washington (1798) was a 24-gun sloop-of-war commissioned in 1798.
  - USS Washington (1814) a ship of the line, was the second such to be launched by the Navy, and was on active service from 1815 to 1820.
  - USS George Washington (SSBN-598), in commission 1959–1985.
    - George Washington-class ballistic missile submarine, lead ship
  - USS George Washington (CVN-73) was commissioned in 1992.
    - Nimitz-class supercarrier
- John Adams has had two ships named after him in 1799 before his death on 4 July 1826, as well as a submarine in the 20th century:
  - USS Adams (1799) was a 28-gun frigate built in New York, and launched 8 June 1799;
  - USS John Adams (1799) was a 24-gun frigate built in Charleston, South Carolina launched 1 October 1799.
  - USS John Adams (SSBN-620), in commission 1964–1989.
    - Lafayette-class ballistic missile submarine
- Thomas Jefferson has had one ship named in his honor before his death, as well as a submarine in the 20th century:
  - USS Jefferson (1814) was launched in 1814;
  - USS Thomas Jefferson in service 1942–1955.
    - President Jackson-class attack transport
  - USS Thomas Jefferson (SSBN-618), in commission 1963–1986.
    - Ethan Allen-class nuclear-powered ballistic missile submarine
  - NOAAS Thomas Jefferson (S 222) was commissioned 2003
- James Madison has had three vessels named for him before he died on 28 June 1836, as well as a submarine in the 20th century:
  - USS James Madison (1807) was commissioned in 1807.
  - USS Madison (1812) was a 14-gun schooner launched in 1812.
  - USS Madison (1832) was a Van Buren-class schooner, designed by Edward Preble and built in 1832.
  - USS James Madison (SSBN-627), in commission 1963–1992.
    - Ballistic missile submarine, lead ship
- James Monroe has the following vessels named for him;:
  - USS President Monroe in service 1943–1946.
    - President Jackson-class attack transport
  - USS James Monroe (SSBN-622), in commission 1963–1990.
    - Lafayette-class ballistic missile submarine
- Andrew Jackson has had three vessels named for him:
  - The United States revenue cutter Jackson, commissioned in 1832.
  - USS President Jackson in service 1941–1955.
    - President Jackson-class attack transport
  - USS Andrew Jackson (SSBN-619), in commission in 1963–1989.
    - Lafayette-class ballistic missile submarine
- Martin Van Buren has had one vessel named in his honor before his death, as well as an indirectly named patrol frigate in the 20th century:
  - USS Van Buren (1839), commissioned in 1839 (See also USS Van Buren).
    - Schooner
  - USS Van Buren (PF-42), a Tacoma-class patrol frigate in commission from 1943 to 1946 was actually named for the city of Van Buren, Arkansas though the city was named for Martin Van Buren.
- James K. Polk has had two vessels named for him:
  - USS President Polk, in service 1943–1946.
    - President Jackson-class transport
  - USS James K. Polk (SSBN-645), in commission in 1965–1999.
    - Benjamin Franklin-class ballistic missile submarine
- James Buchanan has the following vessels named for him;
  - USS Republic (AP-33) was briefly named USS President Buchanan; see also USS President Grant below.
- Abraham Lincoln (Note: Died in office) has three
  - USS President Lincoln, commissioned 1917, sunk 1918.
  - USS Abraham Lincoln (SSBN-602), in commission 1961–1981.
    - George Washington-class ballistic missile submarine
  - USS Abraham Lincoln (CVN-72), commissioned in 1989.
    - Nimitz-class supercarrier
- Ulysses S. Grant has the following vessels named for him;
  - USS General Grant, a steamship gunboat commissioned from 1864 to 1865
  - USS President Grant (ID-3014), later USS Republic (AP-33), in commission 1917–1919, 1921, and 1941–1945.
  - USS U. S. Grant (AP-29), in commission 1917-1919 and 1941–1945.
  - USS Ulysses S. Grant (SSBN-631), in commission 1964–1992.
    - James Madison-class ballistic missile submarine
- Rutherford B. Hayes has the following vessels named for him;
  - USS President Hayes, in service 1941–1949.
    - President Jackson-class attack transport
- Theodore Roosevelt (Note: Elected vice president, became president when the previous president died in office, later elected to a second term as president) has had three vessels named in his honor, including:
  - USS Theodore Roosevelt (ID-1478), troop transport in commission 1918–1919.
  - USS Theodore Roosevelt (SSBN-600), in commission 1961–1982.
    - USS George Washington class ballistic missile submarine
  - USS Theodore Roosevelt (CVN-71), was commissioned in 1986.
    - Nimitz-class supercarrier
- Woodrow Wilson has the following vessels named for him;
  - USS Woodrow Wilson (SSBN-624), in commission 1963–1994.
    - Lafayette-class ballistic missile submarine
- Franklin D. Roosevelt has the following vessels named for him;
  - USS Franklin D. Roosevelt (CV-42), in commission 1945–1977.
    - Midway-class aircraft carrier
  - USS Roosevelt (DDG-80), commissioned in 2000.
    - Arleigh Burke-class destroyer
- Harry S. Truman has the following vessels named for him;
  - USS Harry S. Truman (CVN-75), initially USS United States, was commissioned in 1998.
    - Nimitz-class supercarrier
- Dwight D. Eisenhower has the following vessels named for him;
  - USS Dwight D. Eisenhower (CVN-69), was commissioned in 1977.
    - Nimitz-class supercarrier
- John F. Kennedy has the following vessels named for him;
  - USS John F. Kennedy (CV-67), in commission 1968–2007, Docked at NISMF, Philadelphia, Pennsylvania
    - John F. Kennedy-class supercarrier, lead ship
  - USS John F. Kennedy (CVN-79), commissioned in 2019
- Lyndon B. Johnson has the following vessels named for him;
  - USS Lyndon B. Johnson (DDG-1002), began construction in April 2012 and to be placed in service in 2018.
    - Zumwalt-class destroyer
- Gerald R. Ford (Note: Only person never elected president or vice president, was instead appointed vice president and then later became president when the previous president resigned (both under the 25th Amendment)) has the following vessels named for him;
  - USS Gerald R. Ford (CVN-78), commissioned in 2017.
    - Gerald R. Ford-class supercarrier, lead ship

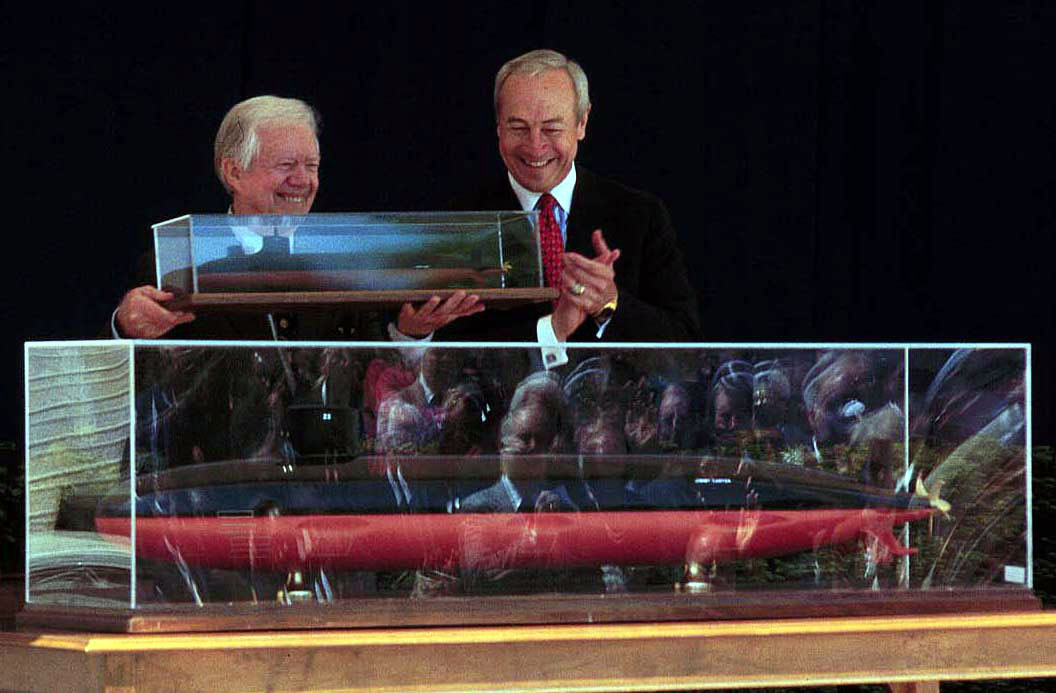
Carter (left) with a replica of the USS Jimmy Carter with Secretary of the Navy John H. Dalton (right) at a naming ceremony, April 28, 1998

- Jimmy Carter has the following vessels named for him;
  - USS Jimmy Carter (SSN-23) was named in 2004; Jimmy Carter was the only living president with a submarine named for him
    - Seawolf-class submarine
- Ronald Reagan has the following vessels named for him;
  - USS Ronald Reagan (CVN-76), commissioned in 2003.
    - Nimitz-class supercarrier
- George H. W. Bush has the following vessels named for him;
  - USS George H.W. Bush (CVN-77), commissioned in 2009.
    - Nimitz-class supercarrier
- Bill Clinton has the following vessels named for him;
  - USS William J. Clinton (CVN-82), named in 2025.
    - Gerald R. Ford-class supercarrier
- George W. Bush has the following vessels named for him;
  - USS George W. Bush (CVN-83), named in 2025.
    - Gerald R. Ford-class supercarrier

== Ship named for two presidents ==
- John Adams and John Quincy Adams:
  - USS President Adams (APA-19) in service 1941–1943.
    - President Jackson-class attack transport

== Ships named for the office of the president ==
- USS President, of which there have been two
  - USS President (1800) was a wooden-hulled, three-masted heavy frigate and was one of the original six frigates of the United States Navy. Captured by the Royal Navy in 1815.
  - USS President (1812) was a 12-gun sloop-of-war that served until 1814 when also captured by the Royal Navy.
    - During a short period both USS Presidents were simultaneously in US Navy service under the same name.

== Presidents with no U.S. Navy vessel named after them ==
- William Henry Harrison
- John Tyler (Note: Never elected president, was elected vice president and became president when the previous president died in office)
- Zachary Taylor
- Millard Fillmore
  - Several non-military vessels have been named SS President Fillmore, one was later commissioned as USS Powhatan
- Franklin Pierce (Note: First full-term president for whom no U.S. Navy vessel was named)
  - See also: SS President Pierce, later USS Hugh L. Scott (AP-43)
- Andrew Johnson
  - See also: SS President Johnson, commissioned as USS Manchuria (ID-1633) from 1918 to 1919.
- James A. Garfield
  - See also: SS President Garfield (1921), later commissioned as USS Refuge (AH-11) from 1944 to 1948
  - See also: SS President Garfield (1940), later commissioned as USS Thomas Jefferson (APA-30) (see above)
- Chester A. Arthur
  - See also: SS President Arthur, later commissioned as USS Princess Matoika (ID-2290) (1918-1919)
- Grover Cleveland (Note: Only deceased president who served two full terms for whom no U.S. Navy vessel was named)
  - Several non-military vessels have been named the SS President Cleveland, one was later commissioned USS Tasker H. Bliss (AP-42) (1942, sunk 1942) and a second was intended to be commissioned as USS Admiral D. W. Taylor (AP-128) but was never commissioned.
- Benjamin Harrison
- William McKinley
  - See also: SS President McKinley, later commissioned as USS J. Franklin Bell (APA-16)
- William Howard Taft
- Warren G. Harding
- Calvin Coolidge
- Herbert Hoover
- Richard Nixon (Note: Resigned during second term)
- Barack Obama
- Donald Trump
- Joe Biden

== See also ==
- List of United States Navy ships
- List of current ships of the United States Navy
- List of U.S. Navy losses in World War II
- List of U.S. military vessels named after women
- List of aircraft carriers of the United States Navy
- List of submarines of the United States Navy
- List of patrol vessels of the United States Navy
- List of presidents of the United States
- Presidential memorials in the United States
