= List of Type C3 ships =

This list contains the names of all Type C3 ships. The Type C3 ships were a type of cargo ship designed by the United States Maritime Commission (MARCOM) in the late 1930s. This list is sorted based on variants of the C3.

== Variants ==
=== C3 ===
The original C3 type, powered by steam turbines; 12 ships were built.

- Federal Shipbuilding:
  - SS Mormacport (MC hull 38)
  - SS Frederick Lykes (MC hull 39)
  - SS Doctor Lykes (MC hull 40) – Converted to USS Hamul (AD-20)
  - SS Almeria Lykes (MC hull 41)
  - SS Howell Lykes (MC hull 42)
  - SS Mormacyork (MC hull 43) – Converted to USS Anne Arundel (AP-76)
- Moore Dry Dock:
  - SS Sea Arrow (MC hull 51) – Converted to USS Tangier (AV-8)
  - SS Mormacstar (MC hull 52) – Converted to USS Elizabeth C. Stanton (AP-69)
- Ingalls Shipyard:
  - SS Sea Raven (MC hull 63)
  - SS Exchequer (MC hull 64) – Converted to USS Pocomoke (AV-9)
  - SS Mormactide (MC hull 65) – Converted to USS Lyon (AP-71)
  - SS Mormacpenn (II) (MC hull 66) – Converted to USS Markab (AD-21)

Four more C3 type, powered by diesel engines, were built at Sun Shipbuilding at the request of the United States Maritime Commission to compare similar vessels powered by steam turbines, but would be operated by the Moore-McCormack Lines. The propulsion system was four 7-cylinder SCSA diesel engines (made by Busch-Sulzer Bros Diesel Engine Co.), rated at 8,500 bhp (6,300 kW) total, driving a single screw through electro-magnetic couplings and single reduction gearing. During World War II, all four ships were acquired by the US Navy, with one ship later given to the Royal Navy.

- SS Mormacpenn (I) (MC hull 44) – Converted to USS Griffin (AS-13)
- SS Mormacyork (MC hull 45) – Converted to USS Pelias (AS-14)
- SS Mormacland (MC hull 46) – Converted to HMS Archer (D78)
- SS Mormacmail (MC hull 47) – Converted to USS Long Island (CVE-1)

=== C3-E ===
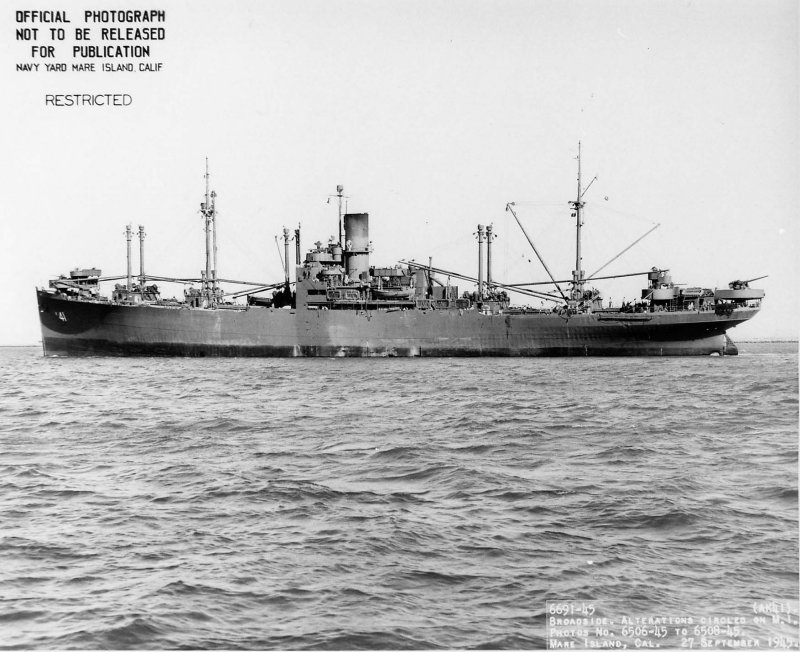
USS Hercules (AK-41) off Mare Island, 27 September 1945.

The 8 vessels of the C3-E type were a private design of the American Export Line, based on the C3 hull with a different stern and equipped with loading gear for heavy cargo.

- SS Exporter (I) (MC hull 34) – Converted to USS Hercules (AK-41)
- SS Explorer (MC hull 35)
- SS Exchange (MC hull 36)
- SS Express (MC hull 37)
- SS Exemplar (MC hull 102) – Converted to USS Dorothea L. Dix (AP-67)
- SS Exhibitor (MC hull 103)
- SS Executor (I) (MC hull 104) – Converted to USS Almaack (AKA-10)
- SS Examiner (MC hull 105)

=== C3-M ===
Two ships of the C3-M type were built for Moore-McCormack Lines, based on the C3 type. Building contracts were awarded to Moore Dry Dock. One ship was acquired by the US Navy during WWII.

- SS Mormacsea (MC hull 136)
- SS Mormacsun (MC hull 137) – Converted to USS Florence Nightingale (AP-70)

=== C3 P&C ===
==== Delta-Type ====
Originally a contract for 3 combined passenger-cargo ships built for Mississippi Shipping Company. These ships, considered a C3 P&C type (also called the Delta-Type) were from a private design based on the C3 design, with accommodation for 67 passengers, provided in 26 staterooms on the shelter deck. Three more ships were contracted for in April 1940.

- SS Delbrasil (MC hull 48)
- SS Delorleans (I) (MC hull 49)
- SS Delargentino (I) (MC hull 50)
- SS Deluruguay (MC hull 150)
- SS Delorleans (II) (MC hull 151)
- SS Delargentino (II) (MC hull 152)

==== Newport News ====
Six ships of C3 P&C type and one ship of the C3-A P&C type, intended for commercial service with American President Lines, were laid down by the Newport News Shipbuilding and Drydock Company of Newport News, Virginia between October 1939 and December 1940. The Maritime Commission acquired them all for military service after they were completed, but only five were initially handed to the Navy and designated President Jackson-class transports with "AP" hull numbers. These five vessels were all later converted into attack transports and correspondingly reclassified with "APA" hull numbers.

- SS President Jackson (MC hull 53) – Converted to USS President Jackson (AP-37)
- SS President Monroe (MC hull 54) – Converted to USS President Monroe (AP-104)
- SS President Hayes (MC hull 55) – Converted to USS President Hayes (AP-39)
- SS President Garfield (MC hull 56) – Converted to USS Thomas Jefferson (AP-60)
- SS President Adams (MC hull 57) – Converted to USS President Adams (AP-38)
- SS President Van Buren (MC hull 58) – Converted to USS Thomas Stone (AP-59)
- SS President Polk (MC hull 110) – The only C3-A P&C type, converted to USS President Polk (AP-103)

==== Ingalls Shipyard ====
The C3-IN P&C type was intended for the United States Lines. These ships were planned with 8,200 DWT and a capacity of 165 passengers in one class. Building contracts were awarded to Ingalls Shipyard, with 4 ships built, with all of them later being transferred to the US Army Transportation Service as transport ships.

- SS Pascagoula (MC hull 109) – Converted to USAT George W. Goethals
- SS Biloxi (MC hull 164) – Converted to USAT Henry Gibbins
- SS Gulfport (MC hull 165) – Converted to USAT David C. Shanks
- SS Pass Christian (MC hull 166) – Converted to USAT Fred C. Ainsworth

=== C3-S-A3 ===
The C3-S-A3 were a private design of the American Export Line, based on the C3-S-A2 hull with a different stern and equipped with loading gear for heavy cargo. Building contracts were awarded to Bethlehem Shipyard, with 15 ships built.

=== C3-S-A4 ===
The 6 vessels of the C3-S-A4 type were based on the C3-S-A2 type, built to a modified design for service with the American President Lines.

- President Taft
- President Grant
- President Pierce
- President Madison
- President McKinley
- President Jefferson

=== C3-S-A5 ===
The 7 vessels of the C3-S-A5 type were based on the C3-S-A1 and C3-S-A2 type, built to a modified design for service with the Moore-McCormack Lines.

- Mormacgulf (II)
- Mormacisle
- Mormacdawn
- Mormacland (III)
- Mormacmail (IV)
- Mormacpenn (IV)
- Mormacsaga

=== C3-S-BH1 ===
The 5 vessels of the C3-S-BH1 type were built for Lykes Lines. While based on the basic C3 design, these ships incorporated lessons learned during wartime, as well as slight structural modifications and major internal changes. They were built by Federal Shipbuilding.

- SS Tillie Lykes (MC hull 2084)
- SS Almeria Lykes (MC hull 2085)
- SS Lipscomb Lykes (MC hull 2086)
- SS Norman Lykes (MC hull 2087)
- SS Doctor Lykes (MC hull 2088)

=== C3-S-BH2 ===
The 6 vessels of the C3-S-BH2 type were similar to the C3-S-BH1 type, but were built specifically for American South African Line (later known as Farrell Lines). They were built by Federal Shipbuilding.

- SS African Star (II)
- SS African Planet (II)
- SS African Rainbow
- SS African Crescent
- SS African Moon
- SS African Lightning

=== C3-S-DX1 ===
Only the prototype for the C3-S-DX1 type was built.

- SS Schuyler Otis Bland (MC hull 2918)

=== C3-S1-A3 ===
The two ships of the C3-S1-A3 type were delivered to the US Army Transportation Service as transport ships, but after several months of service in this role they were acquired by the US Navy and reclassified as the Frederick Funston-class attack transport.

=== C3-S1-BR1 ===
The three ships of the C3-S1-BR1 type (also called the “Del” ships) were combined passenger-cargo cruise ships built for Delta Lines. Designed by naval architect George G. Sharp of New York, they were based on the C3 hull with a custom design. They were built at Ingalls Shipyard in Pascagoula, Mississippi at $7,000,000 each and completed in 1946 and 1947 with new commercial radar. Delta Line (Mississippi) had two departures per month from Gulf of Mexico ports to the Caribbean and South America. Passenger cruise service ended in 1967 and the ships were converted to cargo. In 1975 the three were scrapped in Indonesia.

- SS Del Norte (MC hull 1811)
- SS Del Sud (MC hull 1812)
- SS Del Mar (MC hull 1813)

== See also ==
- List of United States Navy ships
- List of Royal Navy ships
- List of ships of the Imperial Japanese Navy
