= USS Tracy =

Clemson-class destroyer

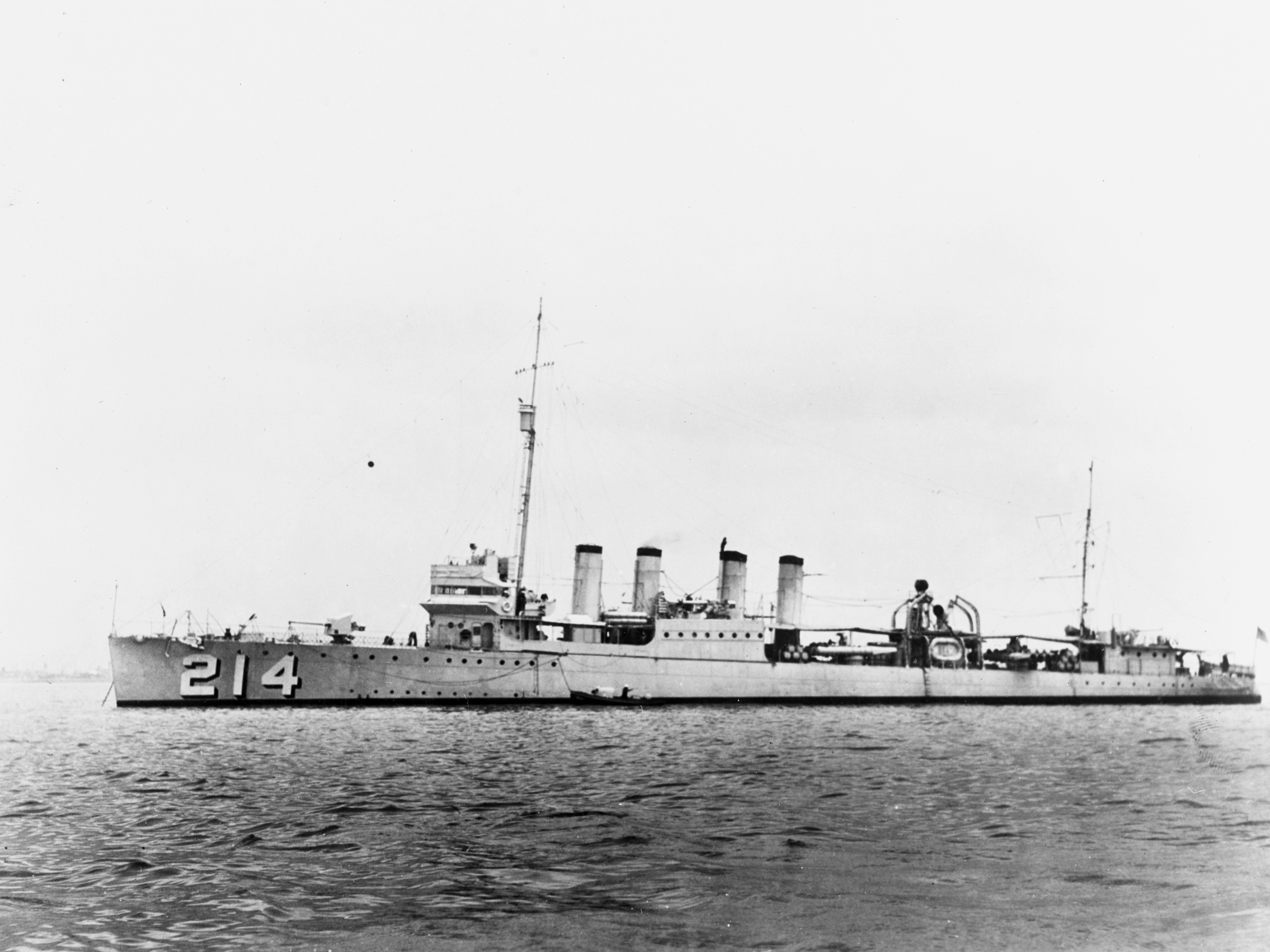
- USS Tracy (DD-214) at anchor sometime before her June 1937 reclassification as a destroyer minelayer.

History

United States
- Name: Tracy
- Namesake: Benjamin Franklin Tracy
- Builder: William Cramp & Sons, Philadelphia
- Yard number: 480
- Laid down: 3 April 1919
- Launched: 13 August 1919
- Commissioned: 9 March 1920
- Reclassified: Destroyer minelayer 30 June 1937
- Decommissioned: 19 January 1946
- Stricken: 7 February 1946
- Fate: Sold for scrap 16 May 1946

General characteristics
- Class & type: Clemson-class destroyer
- Displacement: 1,308 tons
- Length: 314 ft 4 1/2 in (95.82 m)
- Beam: 30 ft 11 in (9.42 m)
- Draft: 9 ft 9 in (2.97 m)
- Propulsion: 26,500 shp (19,800 kW); geared turbines, 2 screws
- Speed: 35 knots (65 km/h)
- Complement: 132 officers and enlisted
- Armament: 4 × 4 in (100 mm) guns; 1 × 3 in (76 mm) gun; 12 × 21 in (533 mm) torpedo tubes

USS Tracy (DD-214/DM-19) was a Clemson-class destroyer in the United States Navy during World War II. She was the only ship named for Secretary of the Navy Benjamin Franklin Tracy.

== Construction and commissioning ==
Tracy was laid down on 3 April and launched on 13 August 1919 by the William Cramp & Sons' Shipyard, sponsored by Mrs. Frank B. Tracy. The destroyer was commissioned on 9 March 1920.

== Service history ==
=== 1920–1941 ===
Following commissioning, Tracy cruised on shakedown to the Dry Tortugas before returning to Philadelphia. She steamed with Destroyer Division (DesDiv) 39 for duty in the Near East, arriving at Constantinople, Turkey, in early June 1920.

With the troubled international situation in the Near East, American naval forces "showed the flag" and stood ready to protect American lives and property. Tracy touched at principal Black Sea ports and also visited cities along the coasts of Palestine and Egypt, as well as Mediterranean Turkey.

Towards the end of the Russian Civil War the Bolsheviks began to overwhelm the White Russian forces and many felt compelled to evacuate. Tracy was one of the ships which embarked hundreds of refugees at Sevastopol and carried them to Constantinople.

In June 1921, she sailed with her division for the Far East, transiting the Suez Canal and touching at ports in India, Ceylon, French Indochina, and Java before finally reaching Manila late in August 1921.

Tracy initially operated independently with the South China Patrol, "showing the flag" at the ports upon which she called. Detached from this duty in the spring of 1923, she steamed to Japan for a goodwill cruise before proceeding to Chefoo for summer maneuvers.

Anchored at Dairen, Manchuria, in early September 1923, Tracy received orders to get underway immediately for Yokohama, Japan, which had been rocked by a severe earthquake. Upon arrival, she participated in the initial relief work there and carried refugees from Yokohama to Tokyo. She sent repair parties ashore to assist in laying fresh water lines and remained in the Yokohama area for two weeks before heading for Shanghai.

There, her landing party went ashore to guard the American-owned Shanghai Light and Power Company until relieved on 12 October 1923 by a force from USS South Dakota. Proceeding to Manila, she spent some time in that port before commencing a cruise to southern Philippine ports on 26 November. For the remainder of her tour in the Asiatic Fleet, she carried out flag-showing cruises and exercises before departing for the United States on 8 May 1925. At Midway, her division was relieved by DesDiv 39.

Arriving in San Diego, California, on 17 June, Tracy was refitted and received new fire-control instruments. She departed the United States West Coast on 24 June and proceeded, via the Panama Canal, to New York City. Spending the next two years with the Scouting Fleet, Tracy wound up her tour by taking part in the reinforcement operations for the Special Service Squadron in Nicaraguan waters during the revolution and civil strife which had broken out in that country in November and December 1926.

Following overhaul by the Norfolk Navy Yard, Tracy returned briefly to Nicaraguan waters in March 1927, and then proceeded north. Steaming from Newport, Rhode Island on 1 June with DesDiv 38, she visited ports in Scotland, England, Belgium, France, Portugal, Spain, Algeria, Tunisia, and Italy. Departing Gibraltar on 28 January 1928, she operated in the Atlantic for one month before orders transferred DesDiv 38 to the Battle Fleet. Based at San Diego from 1 April 1928 until the spring of 1929, Tracy served on occasion as plane guard destroyer with the aircraft carriers Lexington and Saratoga before preparing at Mare Island Navy Yard, in June and July 1929, for duty in the Far East.

DesDiv 38 relieved DesDiv 45 at Pearl Harbor, Hawaii, and then proceeded to Japan for a goodwill visit, arriving at Yokohama on 26 August 1929.

In accordance with the Asiatic Fleet's routine, Tracy alternated duty in China ports in the summer with operations in the Philippines during the winter. The months in between were spent in cruises along the Chinese coast, engaged in "showing the flag" and exercises. During the fall of 1930, after a cruise to the Netherlands East Indies, she was fitted out for extended independent duties as station ship, Chefoo, China.

Japan's seizure of Manchuria in September 1931 and the fighting between Japanese and Chinese forces around Shanghai in February 1932 enlivened the Asiatic Fleet's duty at this juncture, but Tracy's activities were limited to keeping a watchful eye on American interests. Later in the year, the destroyer received orders assigning her once again to the Battle Force, and she left the Asiatic Fleet for the last time.

Tracy took part in maneuvers and exercises in the Pacific and off the U.S. West Coast before being reclassified as a destroyer minelayer and redesignated DM-19 on 30 June 1937. Tracy was then assigned to Mine Division 1 and operated out of Pearl Harbor with the Battle Force.

=== World War II ===
In late 1941, her division entered the navy yard at Pearl Harbor for overhaul. On 7 December 1941, Tracy lay at berth 15 of the yard with her machinery, boilers, and guns dismantled. Most of her complement were living in the receiving barracks ashore, and only a skeleton crew was on board. As Japanese planes swept overhead, Tracy's crew boarded their ship and sought to find ways to fight back.

Some sailors went to USS Cummings and helped to man her guns, while others boarded USS Pennsylvania and assisted in operating the battleship's antiaircraft batteries. Meanwhile, back on board Tracy, the remaining sailors, after assembling three .30-caliber Lewis guns and two .50-caliber Brownings, did their best to drive off the attackers. When the raid ended, a party of ten men from the destroyer minesweeper assisted in fighting the fires raging on board USS California.

Following the interrupted overhaul at the navy yard, Tracy went to sea to commence wartime operations. On 31 March 1942, she assisted in laying a minefield near French Frigate Shoals before returning to Pearl Harbor and conducting local operations. She then headed for Suva, in the Fiji Islands, on 23 July. Seven days later, in company with USS Breese and USS Gamble, Tracy arrived at Suva before proceeding from there to Espiritu Santo.

At bases in the Southwest Pacific, American forces prepared for their first amphibious assault of the war, the Solomon Islands. Tracy, in Task Force (TF) 62, arrived off the beaches of Guadalcanal on 7 August, as the guns of US cruisers and destroyers conducted a shore bombardment. She took part in the hard-fought campaign for the islands, engaged in the unglamorous but vital tasks of escort duty and antisubmarine patrol. She operated between Espiritu Santo and the battle zones through the summer and fall of 1942 before returning to Pearl Harbor in December for a brief refit. On 18 December, she set out for New Caledonia, escorting a west-bound convoy, and arrived with her charges at Nouméa on 2 January 1943.

Designated a unit in TF 66, she operated out of Nouméa and Nadi, on occasion engaged in laying minefields around the American and Allied bases. She also delivered much-needed gasoline to Henderson Field, on Guadalcanal, for the aircraft of the Cactus Air Force.

By late January 1943, the Japanese had decided to abandon Guadalcanal and had begun to evacuate as many men as possible. Increased Japanese surface activity, and corresponding air cover, tipped off the Americans that major Japanese troop movements were taking place, and orders went out to try to derail the Tokyo Express by any means possible including mines, PT-boats, and air strikes.

On 1 February 1943, a large force of Japanese destroyers was sighted heading for "Ironbottom Sound." Tracy, as task group leader, led USS Montgomery and USS Preble in laying a field of 300 mines between Doma Reef and Cape Esperance. That night, the Japanese destroyer Makigumo struck one of these mines and was damaged so badly that she was scuttled. Nevertheless, the Japanese managed to extricate their garrison from Guadalcanal.

Following this action, Tracy rejoined TF 62 for escort duty and touched at Nouméa, Tulagi, and Efate before heading for Hawaii on 19 April. She reached Pearl Harbor on 1 May and, 11 days later, headed toward San Francisco, California for a much needed overhaul at Mare Island.

After refitting, Tracy departed San Francisco on 22 May and spent the next few months engaged in "milk run" convoys between the Hawaiian Islands and the U.S. West Coast. On 10 August, she departed Pearl Harbor and steamed to Samoa, from there setting her course toward Espiritu Santo and the South Pacific.

At the end of November 1943, Tracy led a division of minelayers in placing an offensive minefield near Bougainville in preparations for the landings there.

Next, operating out of Nouméa for the remainder of 1943, Tracy called at Funafuti, Espiritu Santo, and Guadalcanal through December. On 1 January 1944, she steamed in convoy with President Jackson, President Hayes, President Adams, Titania, and Alhena to the Fiji Islands, arriving at Nandi on 5 January.

Underway again the following day, Tracy escorted another convoy to Guadalcanal, conducting gunnery exercises en route, and arrived on 10 January. Later in the month, she departed Efate, New Hebrides, bound for New Caledonia in company with the President Hayes. During the passage, they fought through a storm 1944 Pacific typhoon season before arriving at Nouméa on 19 January. Upon the completion of refueling there, she proceeded to Wellington, New Zealand. For the remainder of January and continuing into May, she threaded her way among the Pacific Isles, escorting convoys and carrying out exercises en route.

On 3 June, she arrived in San Francisco to commence overhaul at Hunters Point. Upon conclusion of the yard work, Tracy underwent refresher training off the U.S. West Coast, ranging as far north as Seattle and Bremerton, Washington. On 31 August, she departed Seattle in company with Cushman K. Davis bound for Oahu, and arrived at Pearl Harbor on 9 September.

After a navy yard availability from 12 to 24 September, she got underway on 29 September, bound for the Marshalls in company with Convoy BD-110T. Arriving at Eniwetok on 8 October, she commenced further convoy runs between Eniwetok and Pearl Harbor, and Pearl Harbor and San Francisco.

With Iwo Jima secured, the Navy then turned its attention to Okinawa. Tracy served as a buoy-laying and mine disposal vessel, arriving off the island on 1 April 1945. In support of the Okinawa invasion, she engaged in antisubmarine and anti small boat patrols off the Fleet anchorages and while conducting screening duty, she rescued survivors from LCI(G)-82, which had been hit by a shinyo suicide motorboat. Tracy herself came through this sustained and effective period of kamikaze assault on the US Fleet unscathed. She departed for Ulithi on 16 April and arrived on 22 April at the atoll to commence a period of upkeep and availability which lasted until 2 May. Continuing operations in the western Pacific, she took part in convoy escort duties through July, when she escorted an LST convoy from Okinawa to Leyte, anchoring in San Pedro Bay, Leyte, Philippines, on 3 July. From 5 to 17 July, she underwent tender availability before entering floating drydock USS ARD-2 (2) for hull repairs.

Under the operational control of Minecraft, Pacific Fleet, she anchored at San Pedro Bay through the middle of August. On 10 August, her radio picked up an unofficial Japanese broadcast which announced that Japan had agreed to accept unconditional surrender terms. Tracy's log noted "much blowing of whistles and searchlight displays by Fleet units present."

On 15 August, she got underway as part of the screen for TU 72.5.38, and, while en route to Okinawa she received word to cease all offensive activities. Entering Buckner Bay, Okinawa, on 20 August, she lay at anchor for five days before transferring Mark VI buoys from Weehawken to various other fast minesweepers gathering to commence the job of sweeping up the mines sown during the war.

The end of the war in the Pacific in August marked only the beginning of Tracy's participation in the gigantic minesweeping efforts in Japanese home waters. From Buckner Bay, the ship proceeded to Japan and she arrived in Nagasaki Wan on 11 September one of the first Allied ships to enter that expanse of water. She served as buoy-laying and mine-disposal vessel during the minesweeping operations which cleared the sea lanes outside that key seaport and continued these duties until late in October, when she sailed for home.

On 25 October she departed for Pearl Harbor, calling briefly at Buckner Bay en route. Arriving at the Hawaiian base in mid-November, she departed there on the 18th, bound via San Diego, California, and Salina Cruz, Mexico for the Panama Canal.

She arrived at New York in December 1945 and was decommissioned on 19 January 1946. Struck from the Navy list on 7 February 1946, she was sold to the Northern Metals Company of Philadelphia, and scrapped later in the year.

== Awards ==
Tracy received seven battle stars for her World War II service.

As of 13 July 2017, no other U.S. Navy ship has been named the Tracy.
