= DD 214 =

DD 214 or DD-214 may refer to:

- DD Form 214, United States military discharge document
- USS Tracy (DD-214), a United States Navy destroyer in service 1919 to 1946
