= USS Cleveland =

USS Cleveland may refer to:

- USS Cleveland (C-19), a protected cruiser commissioned in 1903 and scrapped in 1930
- USS Cleveland (CL-55), a light cruiser commissioned in 1942 and active in World War II
- USS Cleveland (LPD-7), amphibious transport dock commissioned in 1967 and decommissioned in 2011
- USS Cleveland (LCS-31), a littoral combat ship launched in 2023

== See also ==
- SS President Cleveland
