= USS President Monroe =

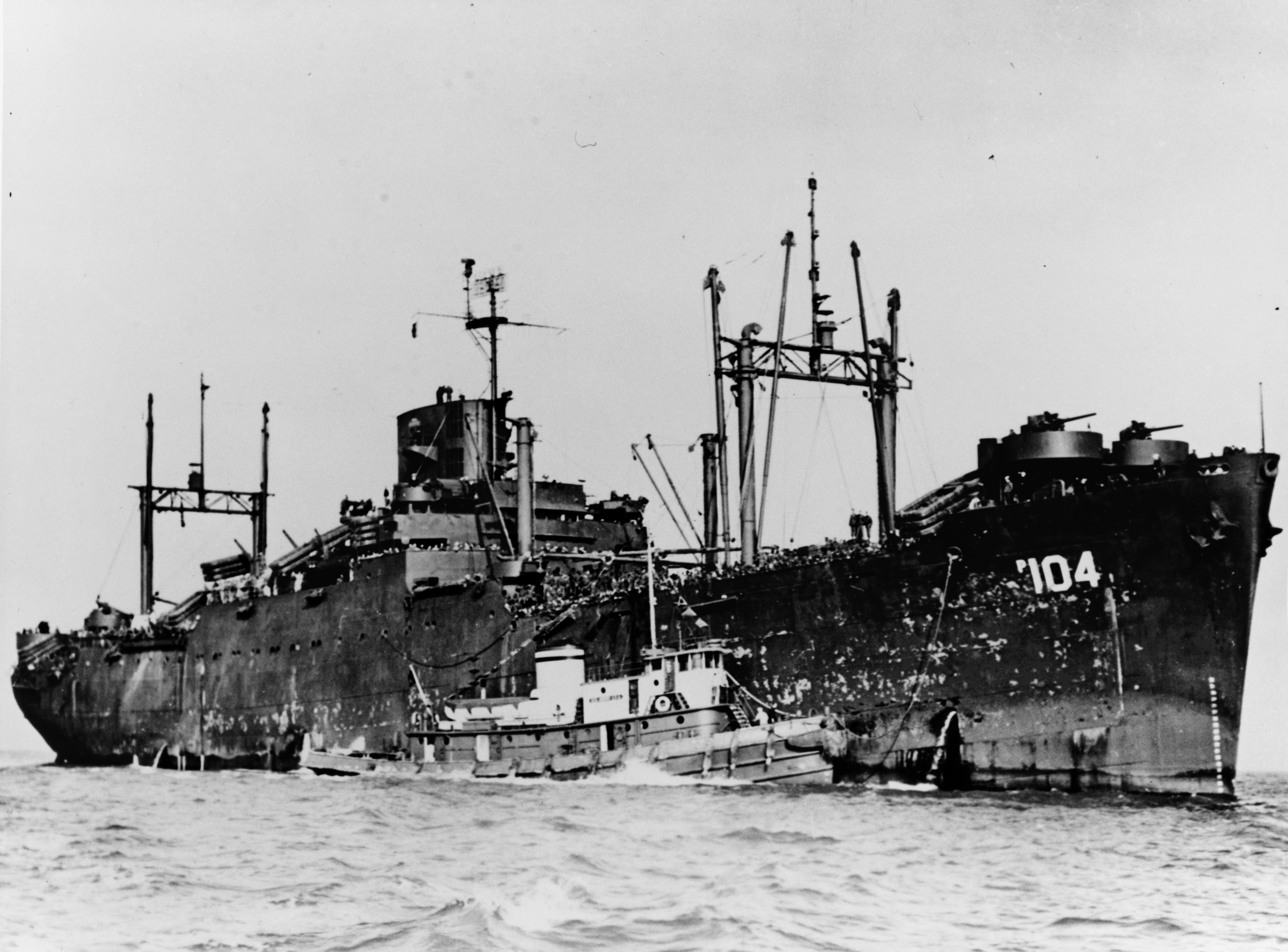
- USS President Monroe (AP-104) circa late 1945 (Official U.S. Navy Photo No NH 78583)

History

United States
- Name: President Monroe (1942 — 1965); Marianna V (1965 — 1973)
- Namesake: US President James Monroe
- Builder: Newport News Shipbuilding
- Laid down: 13 November 1939
- Launched: 7 August 1940
- Sponsored by: Mrs Thomas C. Corcoran.
- Acquired: 19 December 1940; by the Navy, 18 July 1943
- Commissioned: 20 August 1943
- Decommissioned: 12 January 1946
- Stricken: 12 March 1946
- Identification: MCV Hull Type C3-P&C, MCV Hull No. 54
- Honours and awards: Five battle stars for World War II service
- Fate: Scrapped

General characteristics
- Class & type: President Jackson-class attack transport
- Displacement: 10,210 long tons (10,370 t)
- Length: 491 feet 9 inches (149.89 m)
- Beam: 64 feet 6 inches (19.66 m)
- Draft: 26 feet 6 inches (8.08 m)
- Propulsion: 1 x geared drive turbine, 2 x Babcock & Wilcox header-type boilers, 1 x propeller, designed shaft horsepower 8,500
- Speed: 18.4 knots (21.2 mph; 34.1 km/h)
- Capacity: Unknown
- Complement: 512
- Armament: 1 x 5"/38 caliber gun, 4 x 3"/50 caliber dual-purpose gun mounts, 4 x Bofors 40mm gun mounts

USS President Monroe (AP-104) was a President Jackson-class attack transport. (Note: There is some doubt as to whether this vessel was ever formally designated as President Jackson class. The Dictionary of American Naval Fighting Ships does not record her class, although some other sources (such as Navsource) do. Unlike the majority of ships of the class she was never formally reclassified an attack transport (APA); however, she was originally a sister ship of the other ships in the class and like them she appears to have served in the attack transport role during the war.) that served with the US Navy during World War II. She was named after Founding Father and the fifth U.S. president, James Monroe.

President Monroe was the sixth of seven C3-P&C type vessels built for American President Lines around-the-world service just prior to the outbreak of World War II. She was laid down 13 November 1939 by Newport News Shipbuilding and Drydock Company of Newport News, Virginia and launched 7 August 1940.

== World War II ==
The new President Monroe was just clearing San Francisco Bay on her maiden voyage around the world when word was flashed to her Master to return, as Japan had just attacked Pearl Harbor. She and her six sisterships were immediately acquired by War Shipping Administration on bareboat charter for outfitting for war service.

President Monroe departed San Francisco 12 January 1942 destined for Suva in the Australian – Suva convoy with two other troopships, the President Coolidge and the Mariposa, which were destined for Australia, accompanied by two destroyers and the light cruiser USS Phoenix. This was the first large convoy to Australia and the south Pacific after Pearl Harbor with Mariposa and Coolidge transporting Army personnel ammunition and fifty P-40 fighters intended for the Philippines and Java. Monroe landed 660 troops, an air warning company and a pursuit squadron at Suva on 29 January 1942.

On 17 July 1942 the ship that was only partially converted for troop transport departed San Francisco, escorted most of the first day by a blimp and destroyer escort, transporting the 7th Naval Construction Battalion to Pago Pago arriving around noon on 28 July and spending the next few days unloading.

Transferred to the Navy 18 July 1943 under WSA bareboat charter to the Navy, President Monroe shifted to Pool, McGonigle & Jennings Company yard of Portland, Oregon for alterations. Commissioned 20 August as the USS President Monroe (AP-104), she departed Portland 24 August for the Bremerton Navy Yard for conversion and outfitting.

After brief shakedown, she commenced her first "pay" run 9 September on the Aleutian Service. Carrying replacement troops and cargo, she steamed for Kodiak, Dutch Harbor, and Adak, Alaska. She also embarked assault troops at Kiska and transported them to Pearl Harbor, and then returned to San Francisco to be outfitted with landing craft.

=== Gilbert Islands invasion ===
Departing the west coast 3 November, President Monroe joined forces that were marshaling at Pearl Harbor for the first move of the Central Pacific Drive—the Gilbert Islands invasion. She arrived Abemama Atoll on the morning of the 27th bringing the atoll's garrison group cargo and personnel. She touched at Tarawa before sailing for Pearl Harbor with battleship Tennessee and transport President Polk.

=== Marshall Islands operations ===
She remained at Pearl Harbor until 23 January 1944, when she embarked a contingent of marines and steamed for Kwajalein Atoll. She next transported assault troops to Eniwetok, participating through 25 February in the successful landings on Engebi, Enewetak Atoll and Parry Island. Departing Roi-Namur, Kwajalein Atoll 29 February, she called at Funafuti, Ellice Islands, and then was routed to Guadalcanal.

=== Invasion of Guam ===
Following a cruise to Milne Bay, Manus Island and New Caledonia, the transport engaged in logistics and practice landings for the assault on Guam. On 4 April 1944 she departed Espiritu Santo with the main body, 27 officers and 943 enlisted men, of the 44th Naval Construction Battalion to join advance groups at Manus on 17 April.

Between 21 and 26 July, she discharged troops and cargo off Guam, then steamed for Eniwetok to embark wounded before proceeding to San Pedro, California, arriving 22 August 1944. By 4 November, she once again stood out from San Diego and ended the year operating between Guadalcanal, New Caledonia, and Port Purvis on Florida Island in the Solomons.

She joined the well-screened Task Group 77.9 en route Lingayen Gulf 2 January 1945, and unloaded troops and cargo in the San Fabian area between 11 and 13 January. Propulsion problems necessitated repairs at Leyte, after which she steamed in convoy for Humboldt Bay, New Guinea, thence to Ulithi. There she was designated flagship for Transport Division "D" of Task Unit 12.6.1 and steamed for Iwo Jima, arriving 18 March. Embarking troops there, she steamed for Hawaii, en route to San Francisco.

=== After hostilities ===
Through the end of 1945 she made several runs to Pacific Island bases. With the end of hostilities, she extended her cruises to Japan and participated in Operation Magic Carpet, the giant sealift organized to bring demobilizing servicemen home.

=== Awards ===
President Monroe received five battle stars for World War II service.

=== Famous passengers ===
Lieutenant Junior Grade Richard Nixon shipped out from San Francisco to the South Pacific aboard the President Monroe in 1943.

== Decommission ==
President Monroe entered Hunters Point Naval Drydock 12 January 1946, decommissioned, and was delivered to WSA 30 January, returned to American President Lines 21 February, and stricken from the Navy List 12 March.

== Commercial service ==
Following decommission, President Monroe was returned to American President Lines for commercial service on 21 February 1947. She was sold 21 December 1965 to a Greek Shipping Company, flagged in Panama and renamed Marianna V. She was scrapped in 1973.
