= SS President Fillmore =

SS President Fillmore may refer to one of these ocean liners named for the 13th President of the United States, Millard Fillmore:

- SS President Fillmore (1899), the former Hamburg America Line ship Hamburg; served as USS Powhatan (ID-3013) during World War I; renamed President Fillmore in 1922; scrapped 1928
- SS President Fillmore (1903), the former Pacific Mail Steamship Co. ship Mongolia; renamed President Fillmore in 1928; scrapped 1946
- SS President Fillmore (1920), the former United States Mail Steamship Company ship Old North State; renamed President Fillmore in 1940; scrapped 1948
