= USS Theodore Roosevelt (ID-1478) =

U.S. Navy troop transport ship

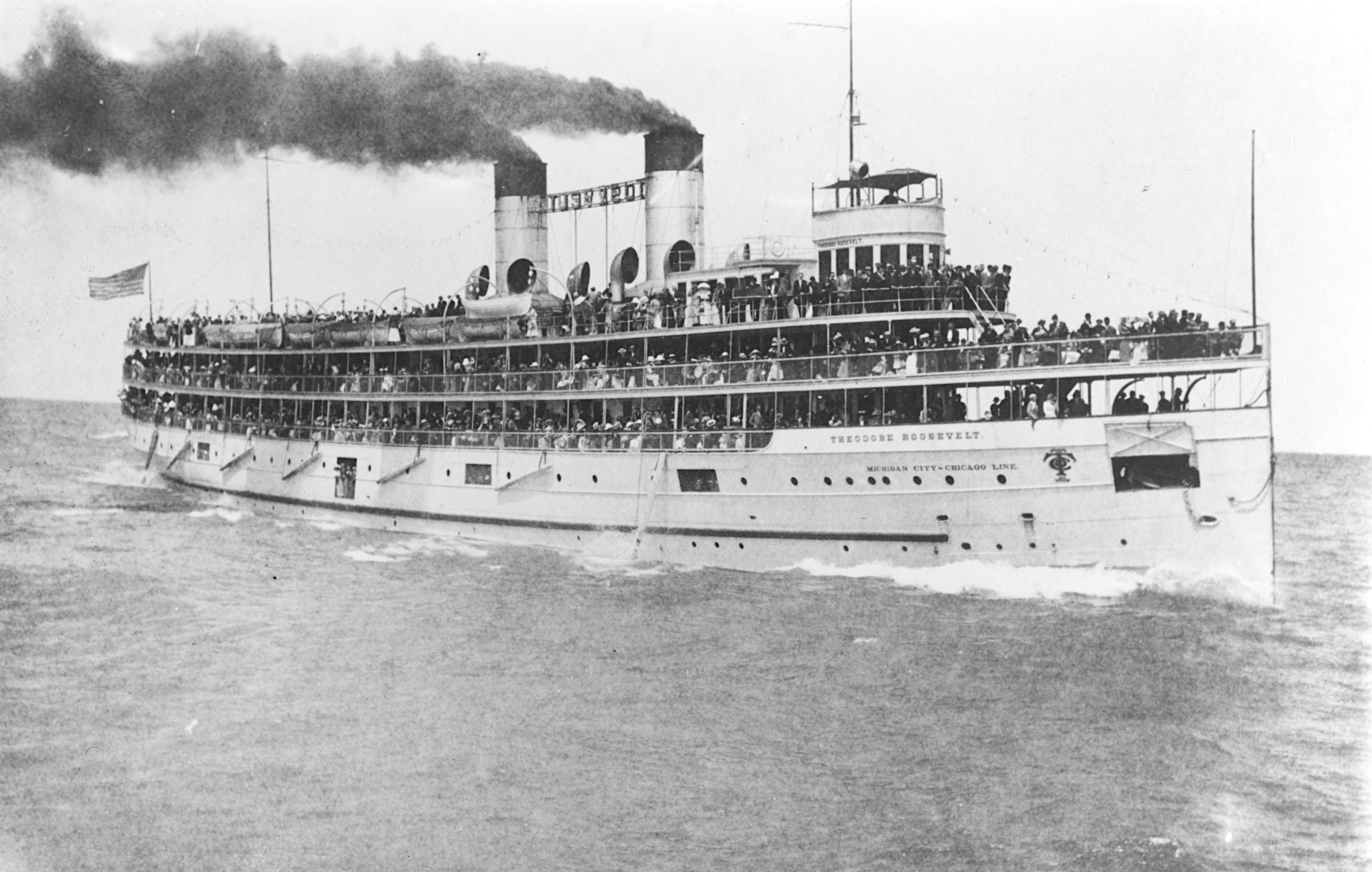
- SS Theodore Roosevelt on the Great Lakes sometime between 1906 and 1918, prior to her U.S. Navy service.

History

United States
- Name: SS Theodore Roosevelt.
- Namesake: President Theodore Roosevelt (1858–1919) (previous name retained)
- Builder: Toledo Shipbuilding Company
- Laid down: 1906
- Launched: 1906
- Acquired: Spring 1918
- Commissioned: 1918
- Decommissioned: 1919
- In service: 1919
- Out of service: 1950
- Fate: Sold for Scrap in 1950
- Notes: Served as commercial passenger ship SS Theodore Roosevelt 1906–1918 1919-1950 and troop transport 1918–1919; scrapped 1950

General characteristics
- Type: Passenger Ship
- Displacement: 1,955 long tons (1,986 t)
- Length: 287 ft (87 m)
- Beam: 40 ft (12 m)
- Draft: 12 ft 6 in (3.81 m)
- Propulsion: Steam engine
- Speed: 20.8 knots (38.5 km/h; 23.9 mph)

The first USS Theodore Roosevelt (ID-1478) was a United States Navy troop transport in commission from 1918 to 1919.

== Construction, acquisition, and commissioning ==
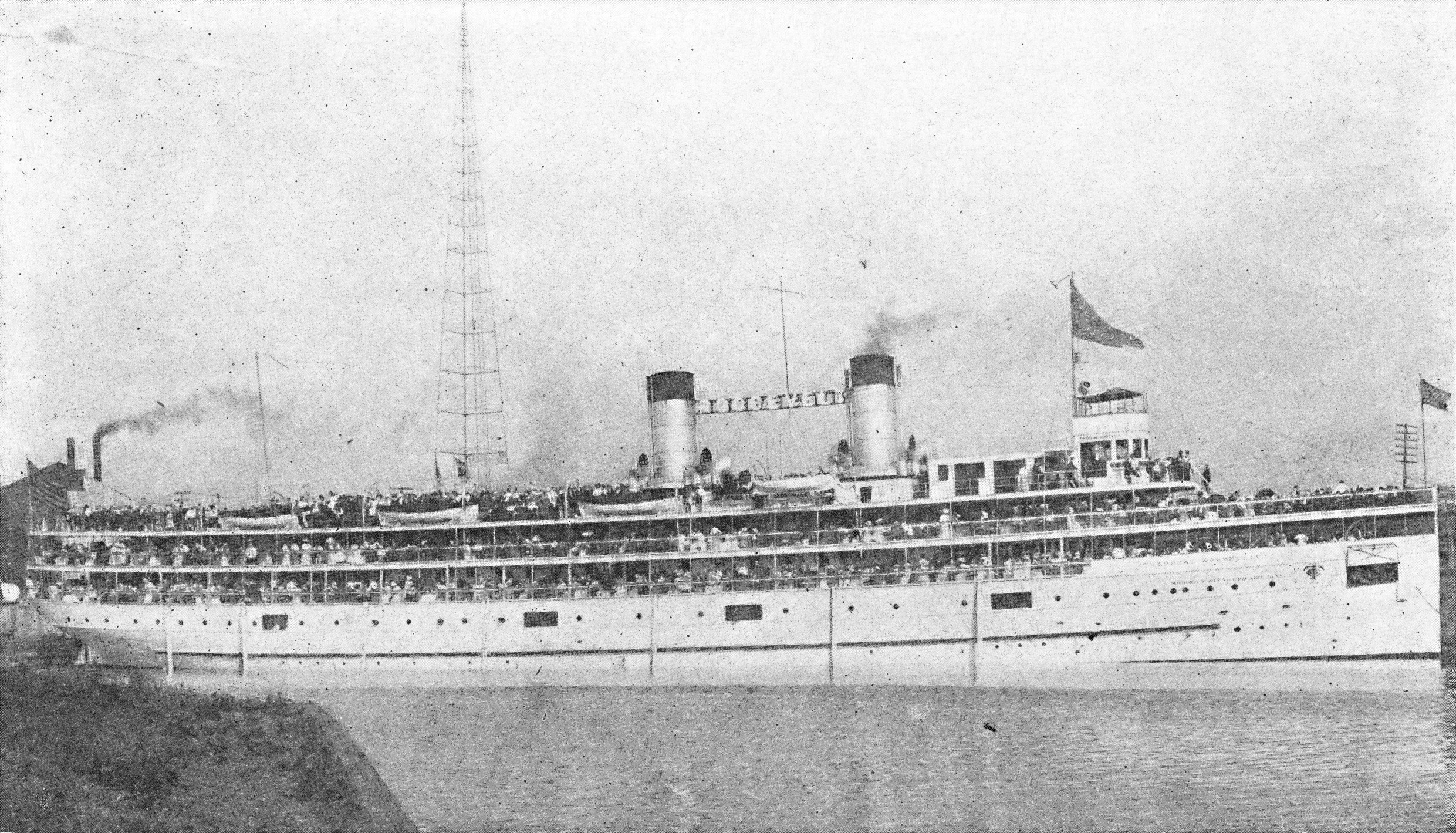
Theodore Roosevelt in commercial service; from a 1912 advertisement for the Toledo Shipbuilding Company

SS Theodore Roosevelt was a passenger steamer built in 1906 at Toledo, Ohio, by the Toledo Shipbuilding Company, and operated commercially on Lake Michigan. Ordered taken over by the U.S. Navy on 6 April 1918 for World War I service as a troop transport, she was acquired by the United States Navy from the Roosevelt Steamship Company sometime in the spring of 1918, assigned Identification Number (Id. No.) 1478, and fitted out as a troop transport during the summer and fall of 1918.

== Operations ==
By 1 November 1918, Theodore Roosevelt was assigned to duty as a transport carrying troops back and forth across the English Channel between the United Kingdom and France. With the intention of taking the ship to the Atlantic through the St. Lawrence Seaway, it was concluded that the ship was too large to fit through the Welland Canal in one piece. Because of this, it was instead used to train troops.

== Decommissioning and disposal ==
As of 1 June 1919, Theodore Roosevelt was at New York awaiting disposition. On 1 July 1919, she was sold to the Cleveland Steamship Company and her name was struck from the Naval Vessel Register the same day.

== Later career ==
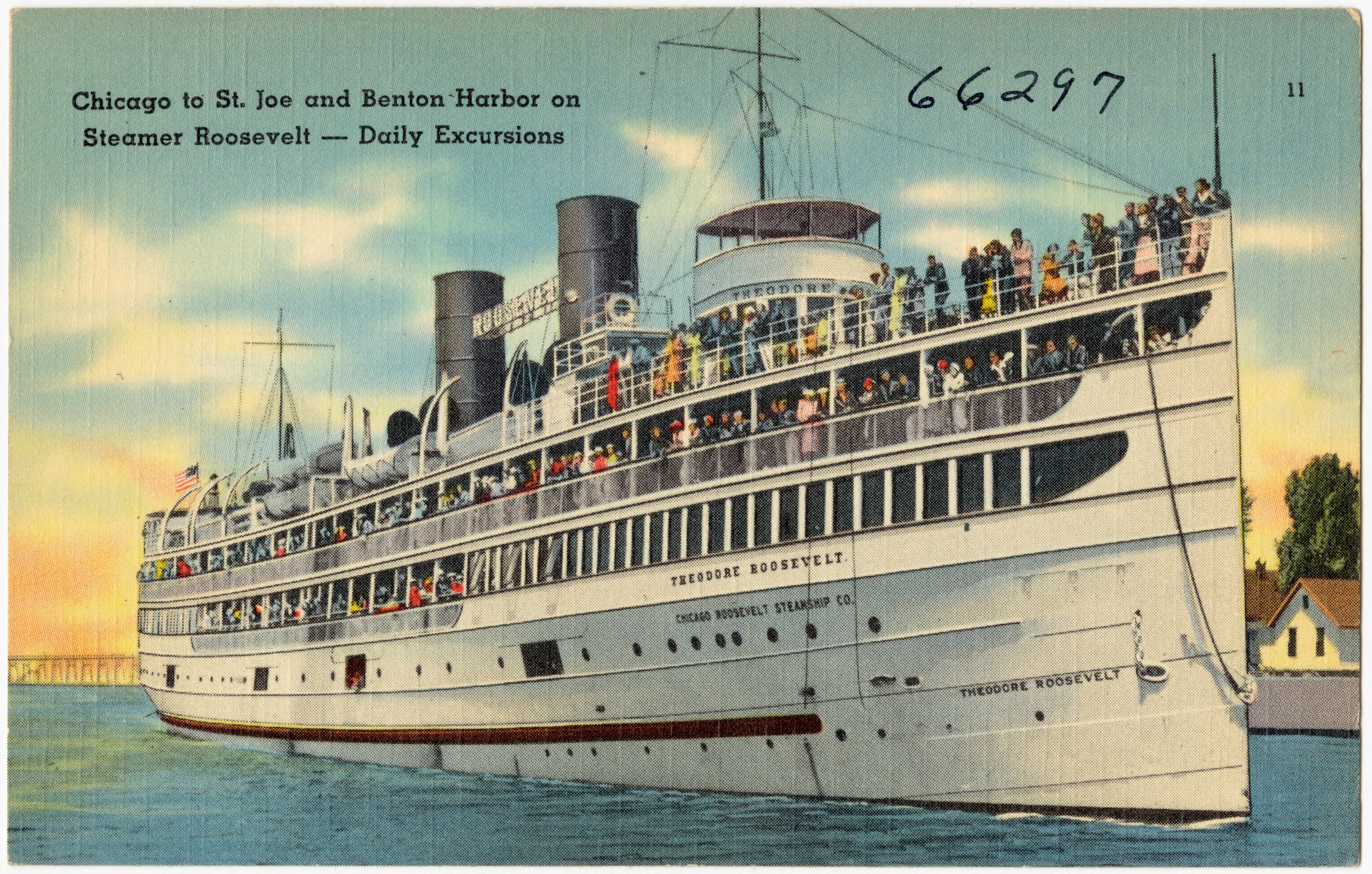
A color postcard depicting the Theodore Roosevelt in scheduled service on Lake Michigan

Once again SS Theodore Roosevelt, she resumed her commercial career as a passenger ship on the Great Lakes, operating on Lake Erie. In 1926, she was sold to the Maritime Securities Company of Manitowoc, Wisconsin, and underwent modifications. In 1927, she was sold to the Chicago Roosevelt Steamship Company of Duluth, Minnesota. As a result of either the 1926 or 1927 sale, she moved back to Lake Michigan. Later in her career she also operated in the Detroit, Michigan, area, and perhaps elsewhere in the Great Lakes. She was sold again to T.J. McGuire of Duluth,

Theodore Roosevelt appears to have been laid up sometime around 1945. She was sold in 1946 to the Cleveland and Cedar Point Steamship Company of Duluth, then again in 1947 to the Cleveland and Buffalo Steamship Company of Cleveland. She finally was sold for scrapping in 1950 to the Cream City Lumber and Wrecking Company of Milwaukee, Wisconsin.
