= SS President Cleveland =

SS President Cleveland may refer to the following ships:

- SS President Cleveland (1920), converted to military use first by the US Army, as the USAT Tasker H. Bliss and later by the US Navy as the USS Tasker H. Bliss.
- SS President Cleveland (1947), planned as USS Admiral D. W. Taylor (AP-128) but cancelled in 1944; completed in 1947
- SS President Cleveland (1968), currently owned and operated by Sealift Incorporated.
