= USS Thomas Stone =

Attack transport ship in United States Navy

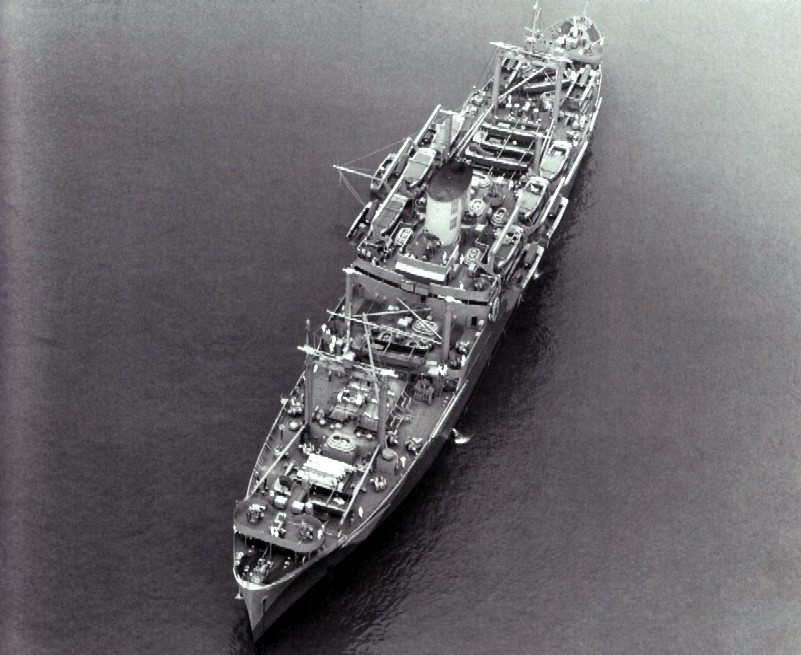

History

United States
- Name: USS Thomas Stone (APA-29)
- Namesake: Thomas Stone, who helped draft the Articles of Confederation
- Builder: Newport News Shipbuilding
- Laid down: 12 August 1940
- Launched: 1 May 1941
- Sponsored by: Mrs Alben W. Barkley
- Christened: President Van Buren
- Acquired: (By the Navy) 14 January 1942
- Commissioned: 18 May 1942
- Decommissioned: 1 April 1944
- Renamed: USS Thomas Stone
- Reclassified: AP-94 to APA-29, 1 February 1943
- Stricken: 8 April 1944
- Identification: MCV Hull Type C3-A, MCV Hull No. 58
- Honours and awards: One battle star for World War II service
- Fate: Scrapped

General characteristics
- Class & type: President Jackson-class attack transport
- Displacement: 11,670 tons (lt)?, 16,175 t (fl)
- Length: 491 ft (150 m)
- Beam: 64 ft 6 in (19.66 m)
- Draft: 24.8 ft (7.6 m)
- Propulsion: 1 × Newport News geared drive turbine, 2 × Babcock & Wilcox header-type boilers, 1 × propeller, 8,500 hp (6,338 kW)
- Speed: 16.5 knots (30.6 km/h; 19.0 mph)
- Capacity: Troops: 68 Officers, 1,197 Enlisted; Cargo: 185,000 cu ft (5,200 m^{3}), 3,500 short tons (3,200 t)
- Complement: Officers 58, Enlisted 535
- Armament: 4 × 3"/50 caliber dual-purpose gun mounts, 2 × twin Bofors 40mm gun mounts, 18 × single 20mm gun mounts.

USS Thomas Stone (APA-29) was a President Jackson-class attack transport that served with the United States Navy (USN) during World War II. She was damaged in combat and consequently did not see out the war. Thomas Stone received one battle star for World War II service.

Thomas Stone (originally AP-59) was laid down under a Maritime Commission contract (MC hull 58) as President Van Buren on 12 August 1940 at Newport News, Virginia, by the Newport News Shipbuilding and Drydock Company. She was launched on 1 May 1941 and delivered to the American President Lines as a passenger liner on 11 September 1941. She was acquired by the USN on 14 January 1942; converted for use as a troop transport; and commissioned on 18 May 1942. Her new namesake was Founding Father Thomas Stone, a signer of the Declaration of Independence.

== Service history ==
=== Operation Torch ===
Thomas Stone loaded troops at Norfolk, Virginia and, on 26 September 1942, sailed for Northern Ireland with Convoy AT 23. After calling at Halifax en route, she arrived at Belfast on 6 October. She disembarked her troops and then combat loaded men and equipment of the 9th Infantry Division for amphibious exercises off the coast of Scotland before getting underway for the River Clyde on the 26th to participate in Operation Torch, the Allied invasion of North Africa.

=== Torpedoed ===
The transport was assigned the task of carrying troops for the British-controlled assault on Algiers. She transited the Straits of Gibraltar on the night of 5 and 6 November. On the morning of the 7th, she was steaming on the left flank of the convoy, second in line east of attack transport USS Samuel Chase (AP-56).

According to the German Naval Sea Diary, the submarine U-205, Commanded by Korvettenkapitän Franz-Georg Reschke shadowed and attacked the convoy. From the sea diary:

Am 7.11. torpediert wahrscheinlich U 205 (Kptlt. Reschke) den US-Transporter Thomas Stone (9255 BRT), der später vor Algier auf Strand gesetzt wird.^{a}

At 0535, a torpedo hit the Thomas Stone's port side, aft, near the engine room, blowing a hole in her bottom, breaking her propeller shaft, and bending her propeller and her rudder to starboard. The convoy continued on, leaving Thomas Stone behind, adrift some 150 miles from Algiers, guarded by British corvette HMS Spey.

A documentary filmmaker and son of a Thomas Stone crew member has claimed the torpedo was not launched by the U-205, but instead was dropped during an air attack by aircraft of Kampfgeschwader 26.

=== Troops rescued ===
After daylight, an inspection of the damage revealed that the ship was in no immediate danger of sinking but was nevertheless unable to move under her own power. But Capt. Bennehoff and Major Walter M. Oakes, USA – who commanded the battalion landing team embarked in Thomas Stone – were not content to let the transport's troops drift aimlessly in the Mediterranean while others took Algiers. Besides, all on board the damaged ship were in deadly peril from a possible renewal of an attack.

To solve both problems, the two officers loaded most of the transport's troops in 24 boats which set out for Algiers Bay under the protection of Spey. However, the weather which had been good when the boats left the transport worsened, and the frail craft began taking on water. Engine trouble forced the boats to be abandoned one by one and their crews and passengers were transferred to the corvette. When Spey finally reached Algiers before dawn on the 8th, she carried all of the crews of the boats and each of their passengers, for every boat had been scuttled. By the time Spey's troops went ashore that morning, they learned that all French resistance had ended.

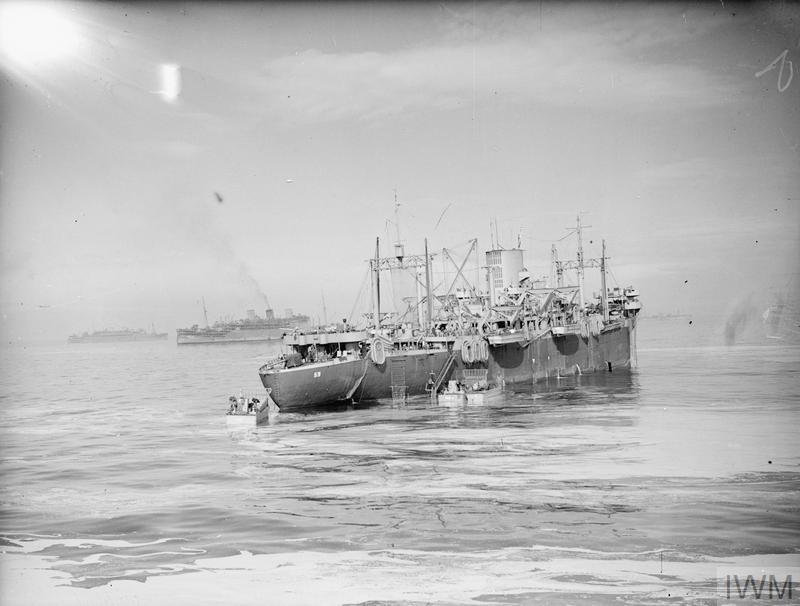
The damaged USS Thomas Stone in Algiers harbor

=== Towed to Algiers ===
Meanwhile, two destroyers, HMS Wishart and HMS Velox, had arrived on the night of the 7th and attempted to tow Thomas Stone. The next morning, HMS St. Day, a tug, arrived to assist. Despite bad weather and the twisted remnants of the Thomas Stone's rudder which made her all but unmanageable, the group of ships finally reached Algiers on the 11th and moored to the Quai de Falaise where she discharged the remaining troops and equipment. On 19 November, Thomas Stone was moved to the outer harbor to make room for two large convoys.

=== Attacked a second time ===
An air-raid on the night of 24 and 25 November caused additional damage to Thomas Stone when a bomb pierced two decks, the hull, and exploded beneath her. On the 25th, a high wind and heavy swells caused the ship to drag both anchors and drove her hard aground, further damaging her hull. While still aground, the transport was reclassified attack transport APA-29 on 1 February 1943.

=== Salvage attempts fail ===
Salvage operations continued for over a year, and all equipment and stores were removed. Efforts to refloat the ship continued until the spring of 1944, but the ship was finally placed out of commission on 1 April 1944, and she was stricken from the Navy List on 8 April 1944. Her hulk was sold to Le Material Économique, Algiers, for scrap.

== Notes ==
^a At 7.11am U 205 (Kptlt Reschke commanding) probably torpedoed U.S. transporter Thomas Stone (9255 BRT), which was later beached at Algiers.
