= USS President Hayes =

Attack transport ship

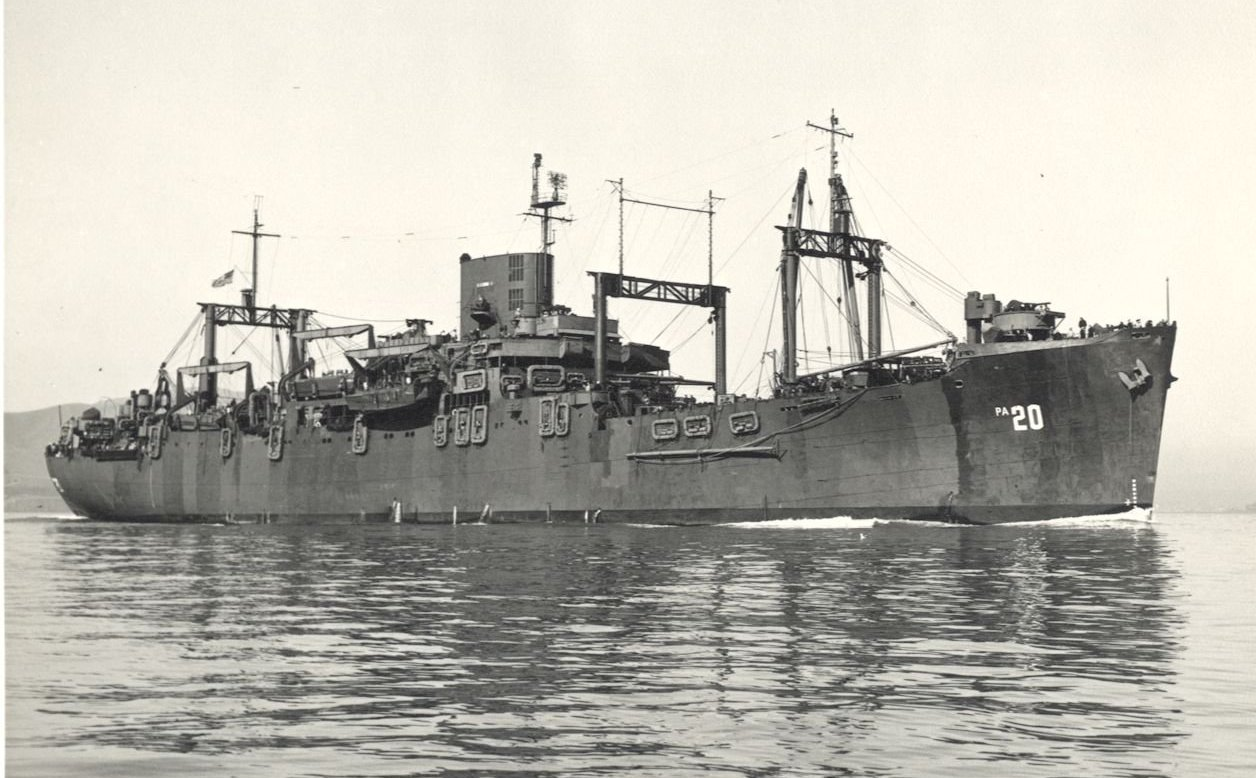
- USS President Hayes (APA-20) underway, date and location unknown

History

United States
- Name: USS President Hayes (APA-20)
- Builder: Newport News Shipbuilding
- Laid down: 26 December 1939
- Launched: 4 October 1940
- Sponsored by: Mrs. Cordell Hull
- Acquired: 7 July 1941
- Commissioned: 15 December 1941
- Decommissioned: 30 June 1949
- Reclassified: AP-39 to APA-20, 1 February 1943
- Stricken: 1 October 1958
- Identification: MCV Hull Type C3-P&C, MCV Hull No. 55
- Honours and awards: Seven battle stars for World War II service
- Fate: Sold for scrap, February 1973

General characteristics
- Class & type: President Jackson-class attack transport
- Displacement: 9,500 tons (lt), 16,175 t (fl)
- Length: 491 ft 10 in (149.91 m)
- Beam: 69 ft 6 in (21.18 m)
- Draft: 26 ft 6 in (8.08 m)
- Propulsion: 1 × Newport News geared drive turbine, 2 × Babcock & Wilcox header-type boilers, 1 × propeller, designed shaft 8,500 hp (6,338 kW)
- Speed: 18 knots (21 mph; 33 km/h)
- Capacity: Troops: 76 Officers, 1,312 Enlisted; Cargo: 185,000 cu ft (5,200 m^{3}), 2,500 short tons (2,300 t)
- Complement: Officers 36, Enlisted 477
- Armament: 4 × 3"/50 caliber dual-purpose guns, 2 × twin Bofors 40mm guns, 14 × single 20mm guns.

USS President Hayes (APA-20) was a President Jackson-class attack transport that saw service with the US Navy in World War II. It was named for Rutherford B. Hayes, 19th U.S. president.

President Hayes was laid down as MC Hull No. 55 by the Newport News Shipbuilding and Dry Dock Co. 26 December 1939; launched 4 October 1940; turned over to American President Lines 20 February 1941; acquired by the Navy 7 July 1941; designated AP–39; and commissioned 15 December 1941. The ship was redesignated an attack transport (APA-20) on 1 February 1943.

== World War II ==
On 6 January 1942 President Hayes sailed for San Diego, via the Panama Canal. During February and March she evacuated civilians and service dependents from Pearl Harbor, then conducted amphibious assault exercises off San Diego, California. On 1 July, with U.S. Marines embarked, she sailed for the Tonga Islands to stage for the assault on Guadalcanal.

=== Invasion of Guadalcanal ===
On the evening of 7 August, while under air attack, President Hayes landed units of the 2nd Marine Regiment on the northeastern side of Guadalcanal. For the next two months she brought supplies and reinforcements from Tonga, Nouméa, and New Zealand. Then, during December, she moved cargo forward from Australia and New Zealand to New Caledonia. In January 1943 she resumed reinforcement runs to Guadalcanal and, as APA–20 (effective 1 February 1943), continued that duty until June.

=== Rendova landings ===
In June she participated in the Rendova landings, shooting down 7 enemy planes. In July, President Hayes completed another troop lift to Guadalcanal, then carried cargo between Guadalcanal, Nouméa, Efate and Espiritu Santo. On 30 October she embarked units of the 3rd Marine Division at Guadalcanal for the invasion of Bougainville Island, 1 November, then brought in reinforcements and replacements during the rest of November into early January 1944.

=== Invasion of Guam ===
On 20 March units of the 4th Marine Regiment, transported by President Hayes, peacefully occupied Emirau Island. In April and May she transported Army replacements for the Marines on New Britain. On 4 June she sailed, with units of the 3rd Marine Division embarked, for the Marshall Islands to stage for the assault on Guam. Enemy resistance during the Saipan operation delayed sailing, but on 21 July she landed her troops and supplies east of Apra Harbor.

=== Rescue of survivors from Mount Hood ===
After resupply runs to various bases, President Hayes was off Leyte 21 October. Retiring to Manus Island 29 October after unloading her troops, she witnessed the explosion of ammunition ship USS Mount Hood (AE-11) on 10 November. President Hayes was not hit and dispatched fire and rescue parties to the stricken ships.

=== Invasion of the Philippines ===
Steaming for San Francisco and overhaul the following day, she returned to the Pacific and made runs between Espirito Santo, Guadalcanal, and Nouméa. During the invasion of Okinawa, President Hayes, with other units of Transport Division 32, had Ready Reserve troops embarked, and after the beachhead had been secured landed her troops and embarked the 81st Army Infantry Division to stand by as a floating reserve. She then steamed to the Philippines, and from May to July moved more troops up from the southwest Pacific to the Philippines. Japan surrendered while she was at San Pedro, California loading more troops for deployment to the Pacific Theater.

=== End-of-war assignments ===
President Hayes arrived at Manila 14 September, then, with troops of the 25th Infantry Division aboard, continued on to Wakayama, Japan, arriving 7 October. On 29 October the troops were debarked at Nagoya, and the next day President Hayes departed for duty with Operation Magic Carpet, returning 1400 dischargees from the Marianas to Los Angeles, on each of two round trips.

== Postwar service ==
On 1 January 1946 she reported to the Naval Transportation Service to deliver dependents of service personnel to Honolulu. President Hayes continued to operate with the U.S. Pacific Fleet into 1949.

== Decommission ==
President Hayes was decommissioned 30 June 1949 at Mare Island. She was assigned to the Stockton Group, Pacific Reserve Fleet, 28 November 1950. On 14 May 1958 at about 4.50am the President Hayes ran aground onto the coral of Observation Bank, in the Paracel Islands in the South China Sea. Eight hours later the tug Tai Koo, captained by William "Steamboat Bill" Worrall, was dispatched from Hong Kong to salvage her. After jettisoning her deck cargo of thousands of Carboys of acid, and pumping out her ballast and some oil, she was successfully re-floated on 19 May 1958.

Her name was stricken from the Navy List and she was transferred to the Maritime Commission 1 October 1958. She was sold for scrap in February 1973.

== Awards ==
President Hayes earned seven battle stars for World War II service.
