= USS President Adams =

Attack transport ship in United States Navy

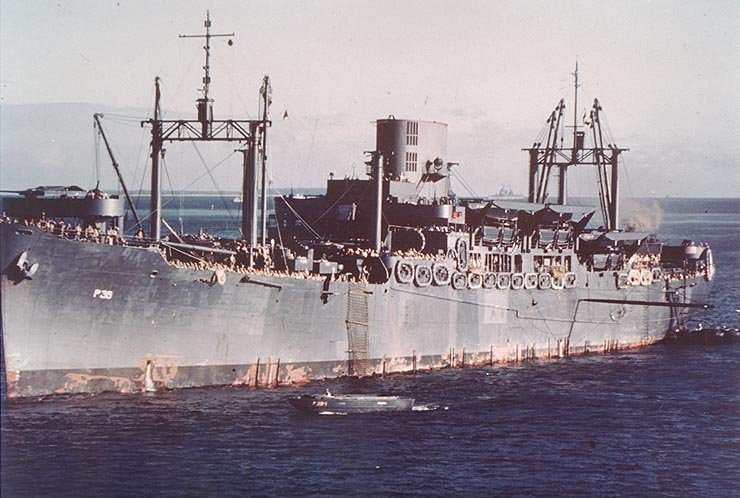
- President Adams (AP-38), probably at Nouméa, New Caledonia, on 4 August 1942, the eve of the Guadalcanal-Tulagi invasion.

History

United States
- Name: USS President Adams
- Builder: Newport News Shipbuilding and Dry Dock Co., Newport News, Virginia
- Laid down: 6 June 1940
- Launched: 31 January 1941
- Commissioned: 19 November 1941
- Decommissioned: 14 June 1950
- Reclassified: APA-19, 1 February 1943
- Stricken: 1 October 1958
- Honors and awards: 9 battle stars (World War II)
- Fate: Scrapped, 1974

General characteristics
- Class & type: President Jackson-class attack transport
- Displacement: 16,175 long tons (16,435 t) full
- Length: 491 ft 10 in (149.91 m)
- Beam: 69 ft 6 in (21.18 m)
- Draft: 26 ft 6 in (8.08 m)
- Installed power: 8,500 hp (6,338 kW)
- Propulsion: Geared turbine drive; 2 Babcock & Wilcox header-type boilers; Single screw
- Speed: 17.9 knots (33.2 km/h; 20.6 mph)
- Boats & landing craft carried: 32 × LCVP; 3 × LCM (3)
- Capacity: 3,600 long tons (3,658 t)
- Troops: 76 officers and 1,258 enlisted
- Complement: 36 officers and 477 enlisted
- Armament: 1 × 5"/38 caliber gun; 4 × 3 in (76 mm) guns; 8 × 20 mm guns

USS President Adams (AP-38/APA-19) was a President Jackson-class attack transport of the United States Navy, named for Founding Father John Adams and his son, John Quincy Adams, the second and sixth Presidents of the United States.

== Service history ==
President Adams, built under Maritime Commission contract, was laid down as MC hull 57 by the Newport News Shipbuilding and Dry Dock Co., Newport News, Virginia, on 6 June 1940; launched on 31 January 1941; sponsored by Mrs. Robert H. Jackson; delivered to the Navy on 5 June 1941; converted by the Norfolk Navy Yard; and commissioned on 19 November 1941.

=== 1941–1942 ===
Stripped for war service with the entry of the United States into World War II, on 7 December 1941, President Adams fired her guns against the enemy, a U-boat, for the first time on Christmas Day. Following the encounter, she continued her shakedown exercises, then, steamed to the Pacific and trained troops off California as she readied for her first amphibious operation. In June 1942, she embarked the 3rd Battalion, 2nd Marines, and got underway on 1 July for the South Pacific. Between 7 and 9 August, as the United States launched the first step on the island-paved path to victory in the Pacific, her LCMs and LCVPs landed the Marines in the Guadalcanal-Tulagi area. Retiring from the area, the converted liner carried casualties to Samoa, whence she began bringing in reinforcements. For six months she transported fresh troops and equipment to, and brought out wounded from, Guadalcanal.

=== 1943 ===
Organized resistance on Guadalcanal ceased on 9 February 1943, but the Solomon Islands campaign was not over. President Adams, redesignated APA-19 (effective 1 February) continued to carry men and equipment to and from embattled islands of the south Pacific, escaping serious damage from numerous Japanese air attacks. During March and April she trained assault troops in New Zealand, then transported men and materiel from there, and from Australia, to Guadalcanal, whence she steamed with United States Army forces for Rendova. Landing those troops on 30 June, she took on survivors from McCawley on 1 July, and sailed to Nouméa.

From New Caledonia, President Adams returned to New Zealand, underwent an abbreviated overhaul, then resumed transporting men and equipment to the Solomon Islands and training assault troops for amphibious operations, this time for the Bougainville campaign. On 1 November, after bombarding the beaches at Torokina Point, she landed the 1st Battalion, 3rd Marines, at Empress Augusta Bay.

=== 1944 ===
During the next six months, President Adams thrice returned to Bougainville with reinforcements; carried Army Engineers to Emirau; transported two groups of Army reinforcements to Cape Gloucester on New Britain; and then prepared for action in the Mariana Islands. In June 1944, she steamed to Kwajalein, thence to Saipan, where, as a floating reserve, she stood by to the east of the island as the Battle of the Philippine Sea raged to the west. With the postponement of the assault on Guam and her troops not needed on Saipan, she steamed to Eniwetok where she remained until 17 July. On the 21st, she stood off Guam as the Battle of Guam got underway, and, during the next five days, unloaded men and equipment, sent supplies and provisions, including hot food, to the beaches and took on casualties for evacuation to Pearl Harbor and the West Coast.

By 16 October, having undergone overhaul, President Adams embarked construction equipment at Port Hueneme and SeaBees personnel at San Francisco and sailed for Manus Island. Thence she returned to New Caledonia where she took on Army infantrymen for transportation west, to the assault beaches on Lingayen Gulf, Luzon.

=== 1945 ===
President Adams landed "passengers" and cargo on 11–12 January 1945, then retired to Leyte, discharging casualties from the Invasion of Lingayen Gulf. She then sailed back to Guam, whence she carried Marine Corps units to Iwo Jima, landing them on 19 February. During the first ten days of the Battle of Iwo Jima she stood off the beaches, unloading cargo, receiving casualties, provisioning and repairing small boats.

After retiring to Saipan, President Adams continued on to Nouméa, whence she carried Army personnel to Leyte, and then, for the next two months, she ferried troops from New Guinea to the Philippines. On 17 July she got underway for the United States.

Emerging from overhaul at Portland, Oregon, after the cessation of hostilities, President Adams commenced moving occupation troops to the Far East and returning veterans to the United States.

=== Post-war, 1945–1950 ===
After the initial post-war transport assignments, she carried dependents to occupied zones and transported military personnel and equipment to ports in Japan, China and the Philippines. On 7 March 1947, she departed the West Coast for Norfolk, Virginia. Arriving on the 24th, she commenced cargo and passenger runs between the East Coast and the Caribbean. Designated for inactivation in October 1949, she completed her last Caribbean run, to Port-au-Prince, Trinidad, and Coco Solo, on 19 January-2 February 1950, and on the 8th departed Norfolk for the West Coast.

=== Decommissioning and disposal ===
On 2 March she arrived at San Francisco, where she decommissioned 14 June 1950 and joined the Pacific Reserve Fleet. She remained berthed at San Francisco until stricken from the Navy List on 1 October 1958, and transferred to the Maritime Administration's National Defense Reserve Fleet, and was berthed at Suisun Bay, California into 1970.

President Adams was scrapped in Taiwan in 1974.

== Awards ==
President Adams earned 9 battle stars during World War II.
