= USS Thomas Jefferson (APA-30) =

President Jackson-Class Attack Transport Ship

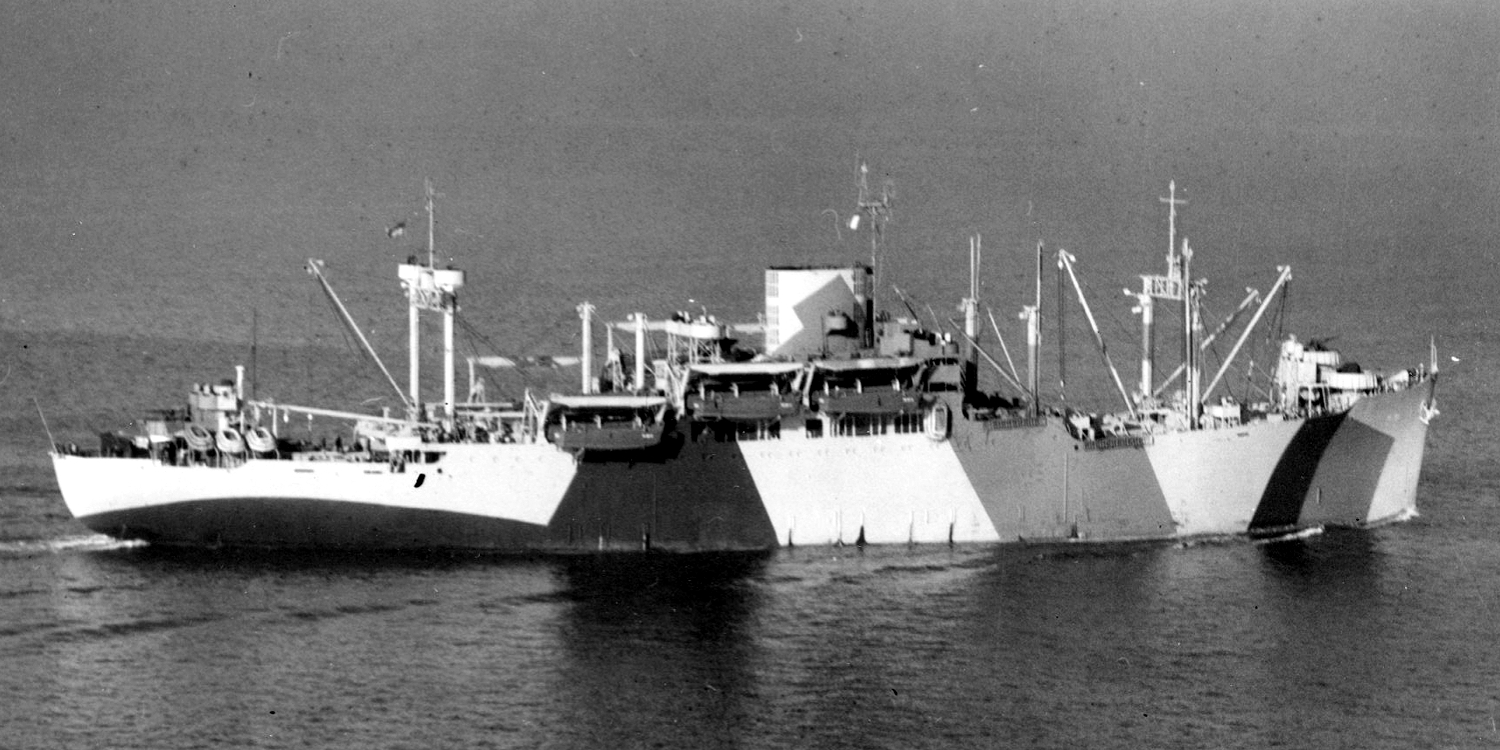
- USS Thomas Jefferson (APA-30) underway, date and location unknown

History

United States
- Name: USS Thomas Jefferson (APA-30)
- Namesake: Thomas Jefferson, American Founding Father and U.S. President
- Builder: Newport News Shipbuilding
- Laid down: 5 February 1940
- Launched: 20 November 1940
- Sponsored by: Miss Eugenia Merrill
- Christened: President Garfield
- Acquired: 1 May 1942
- Commissioned: 31 August 1942
- Decommissioned: 18 July 1955
- Renamed: USS Thomas Jefferson
- Reclassified: AP-60 to APA-30, 1 February 1943
- Stricken: 1 October 1958
- Identification: MCV Hull Type C3-P, MCV Hull No. 56
- Honours and awards: Six battle stars for World War II service and four for the Korean War
- Fate: Sold for scrap, 1 March 1973

General characteristics
- Class & type: President Jackson-class attack transport
- Displacement: 11,670 tons (lt)?, 16,175 t (fl)
- Length: 492 ft (150 m)
- Beam: 69 ft 6 in (21.18 m)
- Draft: 26 ft 9 in (8.15 m)
- Propulsion: 1 × Newport News geared drive turbine, 2 × Babcock & Wilcox header-type boilers, 1 × propeller, designed shaft horsepower 8,500
- Speed: 18.4 knots (21.2 mph; 34.1 km/h)
- Capacity: Troops: 68 Officers, 1,197 Enlisted; Cargo: 185,000 cubic feet (5,200 m^{3}), 3,500 short tons (3,200 t)
- Complement: Officers 58, Enlisted 535
- Armament: 4 × 3"/50 caliber dual-purpose guns, 2 × twin Bofors 40mm guns, 18 × single 20mm guns.

USS Thomas Jefferson (APA-30), serving from 1 May 1942 until 18 July 1955, was a transport and then reclassified on 1 February 1943 as a President Jackson-class attack transport. She was laid down under Maritime Commission contract (MC hull 56) as President Garfield on 5 February 1940 at Newport News, Virginia, by the Newport News Shipbuilding & Drydock Company for the American President Lines. The ship was launched on 20 November 1940, sponsored by Miss Eugenia Merrill. President Garfield was completed 26 March 1941 and acquired by the War Shipping Administration (WSA) 29 November 1941 with American President Lines, the WSA agent, operating the ship as a troop transport. On 1 May 1942 the United States Navy purchased the ship and commissioned her USS Thomas Jefferson, named for Founding Father Thomas Jefferson, on 31 August 1942.

== War Shipping Administration transport ==
President Garfield operated as a WSA troop transport that had sailed from San Francisco 6 December 1941 with troops and the remainder of the 35th Pursuit Group, whose main group had embarked the previous day aboard President Johnson, intended for the Philippines, but turned back after the attack on Pearl Harbor. During the rush to increase defenses in Hawaii President Garfield and the Army transport Tasker H. Bliss sailed from San Francisco 17 December for the islands with troops, aircraft and supplies.

== Navy service ==
President Garfield was purchased by the United States Navy at Newport News, Virginia on 1 May 1942 and commissioned USS Thomas Jefferson (AP-60) on 31 August 1942.

=== North Atlantic operations ===
Following a brief shakedown, the new transport participated in amphibious exercises in the Hampton Roads-Virginia Capes area. On 23 October, the transport embarked elements of the 3rd Infantry Division and got underway the next day with Task Group (TG) 34.9, the Center Attack Group, for the invasion of North Africa. All units of Task Force (TF) 34, the Western Naval Attack Force, rendezvoused south of Cape Race, Newfoundland, on the 28th and arrived off Morocco on 7 November. Thomas Jefferson was one of four transports loaded with the troops that comprised the assault wave against Fedhala. She was in Fedhala Roads at 2353 that night and had her boats in the water before 0200 the next morning. The transport lost 16 of her 33 boats that began the assault, because they landed on a rocky beach approximately three miles from their designated area.

On 11 November, Jefferson's boats rescued survivors of the torpedoed USS Joseph Hewes (AP-50). The next day they picked up survivors of USS Hugh L. Scott (AP-43), USS Edward Rutledge (AP-52), and USS Tasker H. Bliss (AP-42) which had been torpedoed by the German submarine U-130. On the 15th, Thomas Jefferson joined a homeward-bound convoy and returned to Norfolk, Virginia, on the 26th.

=== Transfer to the Pacific Theatre ===
On 27 December 1942, Thomas Jefferson steamed in a convoy bound for the South Pacific. She disembarked troops at New Caledonia and Australia in late January 1943; and, during the passage back to Panama, she was reclassified an attack transport and redesignated APA-30 on 1 February 1943. She departed the Panama Canal Zone on 3 March with a convoy bound, via Norfolk, for New York City.

=== Supporting the invasion of Sicily ===
The attack transport returned to Norfolk in mid-April and participated in landing exercises to prepare for the invasion of Sicily. She reached Oran on 22 June with her troops combat loaded. After two more weeks of practice landings, she sortied with TG 85.2, Attack Group Two, for the "Bailey's Beach" area of Sicily. The sea was rough on the morning of 10 July as the troops clambered down Jefferson's debarkation nets into landing craft. However, when they did land, there was very little opposition. During the operation, the transport's gunners shot down two enemy planes.

Thomas Jefferson returned to Algeria and was assigned to TG 81.2, the Transport Group of the Southern Attack Force, for the assault on Salerno. She departed Oran on 5 September and arrived off Salerno the night of the 8th. The transport landed her troops on schedule on the beaches in front of Torre di Paestum despite fierce air opposition and steamed to Oran to shuttle reinforcements and supplies to Italy. Then, late in November, she loaded elements of the 82nd Airborne Division and headed for the British Isles. After disembarking the paratroopers at Belfast, Thomas Jefferson continued onward to the United States.

=== Supporting the Normandy invasion ===
Thomas Jefferson arrived at Norfolk on 1 January 1944 and moved up the coast to New York in early February. On the 11th, she stood out to sea with the largest single troop convoy of the war on a return voyage to Belfast. The transport next held weeks of amphibious training before steaming to Weymouth, England, to join the Normandy invasion fleet. On 5 June, Thomas Jefferson got underway for France with the mighty Allied armada that was to begin the invasion of "Fortress Europe" and, early the next morning was at her assigned position off the beaches. Her boats landed 29th US Infantry Division troops at 0630. The ship completed unloading that afternoon and, at sunset, re-crossed the channel to Weymouth.

=== Supporting the Invasion of Southern France ===
Thomas Jefferson remained in the British Isles for a month before returning to North Africa early in July. From Oran, she was routed to Salerno to practice amphibious operations with the 36th Infantry Division in preparation for the invasion of southern France. She joined TF 87, the "Camel Force," to land assault troops on the east flank of Provence. Departing Palermo, she arrived off the assault area on 14 August. The next morning, her boats landed troops on Red Beach. The transport completed unloading on the 16th and returned to Naples, Italy, to begin shuttling reinforcements and supplies from Italy, North Africa, and Marseille to the southern beachhead. On 24 October, she got underway for the United States and arrived at Norfolk on 8 November.

=== Return to the Pacific ===
The ship departed Norfolk on 15 December 1944 for the Pacific war zone. She called at San Francisco, and arrived at Pearl Harbor on 28 January 1945. Routed on to the South Pacific, the transport trained with marines in the Solomons and then combat loaded them for the assault against the Ryukyus. She was at Ulithi on 17 March and sortied with TG 53.2, Transport Group "Baker," of the Northern Attack Force.

Thomas Jefferson was off the Hagushi Beaches of Okinawa on 1 April when Admiral Richmond K. Turner gave the command to "Land the Landing Force." Her boats left the line of departure at 0800 and landed 30 minutes later. After five days off the bitterly contested island, the transport headed for Saipan and Pearl Harbor. On 8 May, she departed Hawaii carrying troops and cargo for Okinawa. The ship unloaded there and steamed homeward. After calls at Ulithi, Guadalcanal, Espiritu Santo, the Russell Islands, New Caledonia and Hawaii, she arrived at San Francisco on 15 July. She moved down the coast to San Diego, and sailed from there on the 23d to return to the Far East. She called at Pearl Harbor and then headed, via Saipan, to Japan.

=== End-of-war activity ===
Arriving at Sasebo on 22 September, Thomas Jefferson got underway for Manila three days later. She returned to Sasebo with occupation troops and supplies on 20 October. The transport was then assigned to "Operation Magic Carpet" duty, returning servicemen from overseas to the United States. On 4 January 1946, Thomas Jefferson was assigned to the Naval Transportation Service to transport servicemen's dependents to Pacific bases. She shuttled passengers and cargo between San Francisco, and Pearl Harbor for the next 10 months. On 17 October, the ship departed San Diego for the U.S. East Coast and arrived at New York on 4 November. She entered the navy yard for alterations and repairs which were not completed until March 1947.

=== Post-war operations ===
Thomas Jefferson began the return voyage to the U.S. West Coast on 14 March 1947 and arrived at Oakland, California, on the 30th. Until August 1949, the transport plied between San Francisco and ports in Hawaii, Guam, Midway Island, Okinawa, Japan, China, and the Philippines. She made another round trip to New York in September and October and returned to San Diego on 10 November. Assigned to the Military Sea Transportation Service for duty on 31 October 1949, she continued her Pacific runs until 1950.

=== Korean War support ===
Thomas Jefferson was at San Diego on 25 June 1950 when the North Koreans invaded South Korea. She made a round trip to Yokohama and, on 28 August headed back to the Far East. The transport called at Yokosuka and Kobe before arriving at Inchon, Korea on 20 September for eight days. In October, she was again in Korean waters, shuttling troops and cargo from Pusan to Riwon, north of the 40th parallel. The ship returned to Sasebo on 10 November and then got underway for San Francisco.

The attack transport remained at San Francisco from 1 December 1950 to 24 January 1951 when she headed directly to Pusan with troops and cargo. She off-loaded between 8 and 10 February; returned to the United States; and was back at Pusan on 2 April. The next day, the ship got underway for San Francisco, but stayed only to embark troops and supplies before beginning the return voyage, via Amchitka, to Japan. The transport made voyages to Korea again in May and August. She returned to San Francisco on 10 September 1951 and did not sail west of the Hawaiian Islands until 1954.

=== Final inactivation and decommissioning ===
APA-30 cruised to the Far East in August and December 1954 before returning to San Francisco for inactivation. She was placed in commission, in reserve, on 7 March 1955 and out of commission, in reserve, on 18 July of that year. The transport was stricken from the Navy list on 1 October 1958 and transferred to the Maritime Administration for disposal. She was sold to Zidell Explorations, Inc., Portland, Oregon, on 1 March 1973 and scrapped.

=== Military awards and honors ===
USS Thomas Jefferson was awarded six battle stars for World War II service and four for the Korean War.

- European-African-Middle Eastern Campaign Medal with five battle stars
- Asiatic-Pacific Campaign Medal with one battle star
- World War II Victory Medal
- Navy Occupation Medal with "ASIA" clasp
- China Service Medal
- National Defense Service Medal
- Korean Service Medal with four battle stars
- United Nations Service Medal

== Bibliography ==
- Maritime Administration. "President Garfield". Ship History Database Vessel Status Card. U.S. Department of Transportation, Maritime Administration. Archived from the original on 2 April 2015.
- Leighton, Richard M; Coakley, Robert W (1968) [1st. Pub. 1955]. The War Department – Global Logistics And Strategy 1940–1943. United States Army in World War II. Washington, DC: Center of Military History, United States Army. LCCN 55060001.
- Matloff, Maurice; Snell, Edwin M. (1953). The War Department: Strategic Planning For Coalition Warfare 1941–1942. United States Army in World War II. Washington, DC: Center of Military History, United States Army. LCCN 53061477.
- Naval History And Heritage Command. "Thomas Jefferson". Dictionary of American Naval Fighting Ships. Naval History And Heritage Command.
