= SS President Cleveland (1920) =

American passenger vessel

Coordinates: 33°40′N 7°35′W

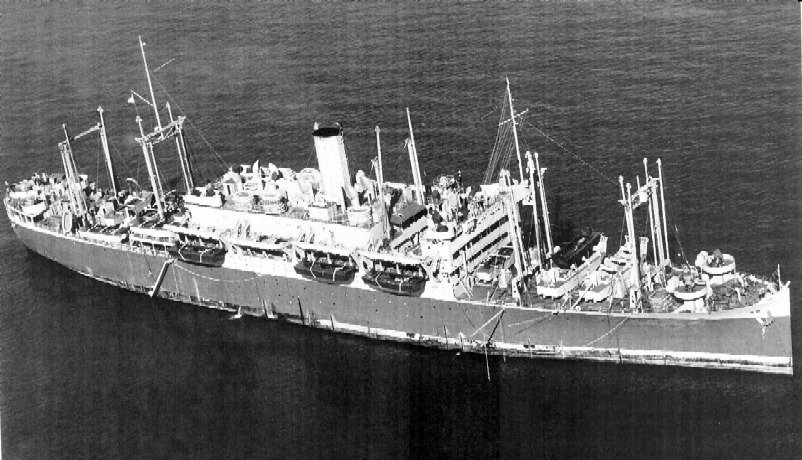
- USS Tasker H. Bliss

History

United States
- Name: Golden State; President Cleveland; Tasker H. Bliss
- Namesake: California (nickname); President Grover Cleveland; General Tasker H. Bliss
- Builder: Newport News Shipbuilding and Drydock
- Cost: $6,291,944.92
- Yard number: 256
- Launched: 17 July 1920
- Acquired: 19 August 1942
- Commissioned: USS Tasker H. Bliss (AP-42), 15 September 1942
- Stricken: 7 December 1942
- Identification: U.S. Official number 220485
- Honors and awards: 1 Battle Star
- Fate: Sunk, 12 November 1942

General characteristics
- Type: Emergency Fleet Corporation Design 1029 ship
- Displacement: 12,568 long tons (12,770 t)
- Length: 535 ft (163 m)
- Beam: 72 ft 2 in (22.00 m)
- Draft: 27 ft 8 in (8.43 m)
- Propulsion: Steam turbine(s)
- Speed: 16.5 kn (19.0 mph; 30.6 km/h)
- Complement: 235
- Armament: Unknown

SS President Cleveland was originally built as Golden State for the United States Shipping Board (USSB), one of the planned World War I troop transports converted before construction into passenger and cargo vessels launched as Emergency Fleet Corporation Design 1029 ships first known, along with the smaller Design 1095 versions, in the trade as "State" ships due to names assigned for the nicknames of states and later as "535s" for their length overall. Almost all ships of both designs were renamed for United States presidents by May 1921, with Golden State being renamed President Cleveland. As one of the USSB-owned ships operated by agents of the board, President Cleveland was allocated to and operated by the Pacific Mail Steamship Company until sold by the USSB to the Dollar Steamship Line in 1925. After the demise of that line and creation of a new, replacement line, American President Lines, the ship remained with that line until government acquisition for the Second World War.

President Cleveland was acquired by the War Department and renamed Tasker H. Bliss and converted into a troop transport which served in the Pacific immediately preceding and after outbreak of the war. She was acquired from the United States Army by the United States Navy for war use, commissioned USS Tasker H. Bliss on 15 September 1942, and designated as transport AP-42. On 12 November 1942, while supporting Operation Torch of the North African campaign she was sunk after being struck by a German submarine’s torpedo at Fedala Bay, Morocco. From the 235 men on board, 31 died in the sinking or afterwards from their wounds.

== Construction ==
Golden State, one of the Emergency Fleet Corporation (EFC) Design 1029 ships, often called in the trade "535s" for their length overall, planned as a troop transport, but redesigned and built as a passenger and cargo ship, with yard hull number 256, was launched 17 July 1920 in Newport News, Virginia, by the Newport News Shipbuilding and Drydock Company and completed in 1921 assigned United States official number 220485.

== Commercial service ==
Golden State was originally owned by the United States Shipping Board (USSB), allocated to and operated by its agents. The ship was renamed President Cleveland by May 1921 and was eventually owned and operated as a passenger liner by the American President Lines.

The USSB first placed the ship in service with Pacific Mail Steamship Company for service between San Francisco and Asia with the ship arriving 7 March 1921, second after sister ship Hawkeye State operated by Matson Navigation Company arrived on 5 March in what some described as a race from Baltimore, but the company noted was not as Golden State made several more port calls on the voyage. By December 1923, the ship, now President Cleveland, was operating with sailings every 14 days from San Francisco to Honolulu, Japan, China, and the Philippines in a route dubbed "The Sunshine Belt to the Orient" with President Lincoln, President Pierce, President Taft, and President Wilson. As late as May 1925, the ships were seen as USSB vessels of the California Orient Line operated by Pacific Mail Steamship Company, but the next month those vessels were seen in an advertisement headed "Now serving the transpacific and round-the-world fleets of Dollar Steamship Line.

Robert Stanley Dollar, son of the founder Captain Robert Dollar, had already acquired a fleet of the smaller Design 1095 ships, commonly known in the trade as "502s" or less frequently as "522s" for their length between perpendiculars and overall, respectively, and established a successful service circling the globe with 22 port calls when the government approached the company about purchase of the larger "535s". President Cleveland and the other former USSB ships of Pacific Mail's fleet continued to operate in this service until 1938 when the United States Maritime Commission, successor to the USSB, judged the Dollar company unsound and took over the assets including the ships to be operated by a new company, American President Lines. The seven "502s" were to remain on the Round the World service while the five "535s" along with larger and newer ship President Coolidge were to go into New York-San Francisco-Asiatic service for American President Lines.

One of the ship's most famous passengers was the Nobel Prize–winning author Sigrid Undset, who fled the Nazis by travelling across Russia and sailed to the USA on the President Cleveland.

== World War II service ==
=== U.S. Army ===
The American President liner President Cleveland was chartered by the U.S. Army in July 1941 and renamed USAT Tasker H. Bliss for General Tasker H. Bliss, who was Army Chief of Staff in 1917 to 1918. The ship was quickly converted at San Francisco into a troop transport and made an initial voyage to Alaska by way of Seattle. After returning to San Francisco in August, Bliss made quick turn around for a voyage to Manila by way of Honolulu and Guam, returning in September 1941. In October 1941, Bliss made another round trip to Manila, and after voyage repairs and additional alterations at San Francisco, made a round trip to Hawaii.

After the Japanese attack on Pearl Harbor, reinforcement of Hawaii was extremely urgent and shipments were hurriedly organized. A convoy composed of Lurline, Matsonia, and Monterey left San Francisco on 16 December 1941 transporting troops, ammunition, and pursuit aircraft with Bliss and President Garfield departing on 17 December with troops, aircraft, and supplies. A voyage to Australia and the ports of Brisbane, Melbourne, and Sydney followed before Bliss returned to San Francisco in April 1942 to make another round trip to Hawaii before sailing again for Australia and New Zealand. From there, Bliss departed in June 1942 for Baltimore by way of the Panama Canal, Guantanamo, Key West, and Hampton Roads.

=== U.S. Navy ===
The ship was transferred to the U.S. Navy on 19 August 1942 at Baltimore, where she was converted for use as a Navy transport by the Maryland Drydock Co., Baltimore, Maryland, and commissioned on 15 September 1942 as USS Tasker H. Bliss designated as transport AP-42.

Tasker H. Bliss arrived at Norfolk, Virginia, on 22 September and joined Task Force 34 (TF 34). After loading troops and equipment to participate in Operation Torch, the invasion of North Africa, the ships of the task force sailed on 24–25 October for the coast of Morocco. The ship was assigned to Task Group 34.9 (TG 34.9), Center Attack Group, and arrived off Fedhala, Morocco on 8 November. During the landings, Bliss had to re-embark the 3d Reconnaissance Troop of 1st Battalion, 7th Infantry Regiment after a failed night attack to destroy a heavy antiaircraft gun battery at Beach Yellow, on Cap de Fedala southwest of the town of Fedhala.

The Naval Battle of Casablanca delayed off-loading cargo, and postponed departure from the Moroccan coast. On the evening of 12 November 1942, she was riding at anchor in Fedhala Roads when the Kriegsmarine submarine U-130 commanded by Ernst Kals slipped in among the ships and fired five torpedoes at three transports. All torpedoes hit their targets, and they burst into flames. The victims were transports Edward Rutledge, Hugh L. Scott, and Tasker H. Bliss. All were abandoned and the first two sank shortly, but Tasker H. Bliss burned until 02:30 the next morning and then sank. There were 31 casualties. She was struck from the Naval Vessel Register on 7 December.

Tasker H. Bliss received one battle star for World War II service.

== Bibliography ==
- APL (American President Lines). "APL History" (PDF). APL (American President Lines).
- Charles, Roland W. (1947). Troopships of World War II (PDF). Washington: The Army Transportation Association. LCCN 47004779. Archived from the original (PDF) on 30 October 2020.
- Hoffman, Gene (1938). "Full Steam Ahead for the American President Lines Round the World". Pacific Marine Review. 35 (November). San Francisco: J.S. Hines: 22–28.
- Howe, George F. (1993). The Mediterranean Theater of Operations — Northwest Africa: Seizing The Initiative In The West. United States Army In World War II. Washington, DC: Center Of Military History, United States Army. LCCN 57060021. Archived from the original on 2015-05-28.
- Leighton, Richard M; Coakley, Robert W (1968) [1st. Pub. 1955]. The War Department — Global Logistics And Strategy 1940–1943. United States Army In World War II. Washington, DC: Center Of Military History, United States Army. LCCN 55060001. Archived from the original on 2017-10-11.
- McKellar, Norman L. "Steel Shipbuilding under the U. S. Shipping Board, 1917-1921, Part V, Contract Steel Ships". Steel Shipbuilding under the U. S. Shipping Board, 1917–1921. ShipScribe.
- Naval History And Heritage Command. "Tasker H. Bliss". Dictionary of American Naval Fighting Ships. Naval History And Heritage Command.
- Marine Review (1921). "1920 Construction Record of U.S. Yards". The Marine Review. 51 (February). New York: 99.
- Nautical Gazette (1921). "First 535's to Reach Pacific Get Warm Welcome". The Nautical Gazette. 100 (March 12, 1921). New York: The Nautical Gazette, Inc.: 339.
- "Cost of U.S.S.B. Vessels". Pacific Marine Review. 19 (July). San Francisco: J.S. Hines: 434. 1922.
- "Pacific Mail Trans-Pacific Service (advertisement)". Pacific Marine Review. 20 (December). San Francisco: J.S. Hines: 616. 1923.
- "United States Government Combination Freight and Passenger Service From Pacific Ports (advertisement)". Pacific Marine Review. 22 (May). San Francisco: J.S. Hines. 1925.
- "Pacific Marine Review (multiple articles)". Pacific Marine Review. 22 (June). San Francisco: J.S. Hines. 1925.
