= USS President Jackson =

President Jackson class attrack transport

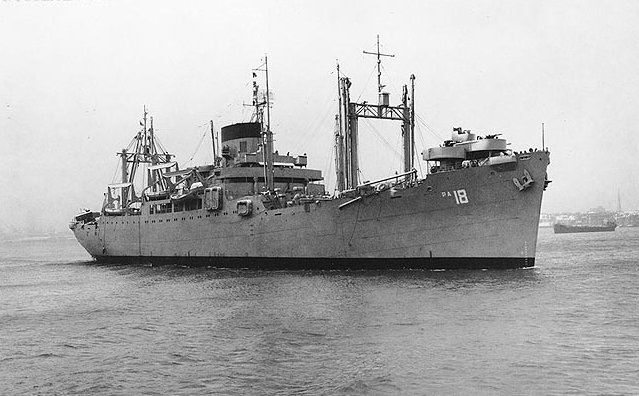
- USS President Jackson (APA-18) in the Elizabeth River, Virginia, 8 March 1947

History

United States
- Name: USS President Jackson (APA-30)
- Namesake: President Andrew Jackson
- Builder: Newport News Shipbuilding
- Laid down: 2 October 1939
- Launched: 7 June 1940
- Sponsored by: Mrs William G. McAdoo
- Acquired: 30 June 1941
- Commissioned: 16 January 1942
- Decommissioned: 6 July 1955
- Reclassified: AP-37 to APA-18, 1 February 1943
- Stricken: 1 October 1958
- Identification: MCV Hull Type C3-P&C, MCV Hull No. 53
- Honours and awards: Eight battle stars for World War II service and three for the Korean War
- Fate: Sold for scrap, 23 April 1973

General characteristics
- Class & type: President Jackson-class attack transport
- Displacement: 9,500 tons (lt), 16,175 fl)
- Length: 491 ft 10 in (149.91 m)
- Beam: 69 ft 6 in (21.18 m)
- Draft: 26 ft 6 in (8.08 m)
- Propulsion: 1 × Newport News geared drive turbine, 2 × Babcock & Wilcox header-type boilers, 1 × propeller, designed shaft horsepower 8,500
- Speed: 17–18 knots (20–21 mph; 31–33 km/h)
- Capacity: Troops: 70 Officers, 1,312 Enlisted; Cargo: 185,000 ft^{3} (5,200 m^{3}), 3,500 short tons (3,200 t)
- Complement: Officers 35, Enlisted 477
- Armament: 4 × 3"/50 caliber dual-purpose guns, 2 × single Bofors 40mm guns, 12 × single 20mm guns.

USS President Jackson (APA-18) was a President Jackson-class attack transport that saw service with the US Navy in World War II and the Korean War. She was the lead ship in her class.

== Operational history ==
President Jackson was laid down as MC hull 53 by the Newport News Shipbuilding and Dry Dock Co., Newport News, Virginia. 2 October 1939; launched 7 June 1940; sponsored by Mrs. William G. McAdoo; and delivered to the American President Lines 25 October 1940.

After two round-the-world trips from New York City, President Jackson was acquired by the navy 30 June 1941, and commissioned 16 January 1942.

=== World War II Pacific Theater operations ===
Following shakedown and practice amphibious assault training on the U.S. West Coast, President Jackson sailed for the South Pacific 1 July 1942, as a unit of Transport Division 2. She landed the 1st Battalion, 2nd Marines, on Florida Island, Solomon Islands, 7 August 1942. At mid-month she evacuated 500 survivors of the "First Battle of Savo Island" to Noumea, then began bringing in reinforcements and evacuating casualties of land and sea actions.

Redesignated APA–18 on 1 February 1943, President Jackson continued to transport reinforcement troops and cargo in support of the consolidation of the southern Solomons. On 30 June, she landed the 172nd U.S. Army Combat Team and two construction battalion companies on Rendova, then transported survivors of USS McCawley (AP-10), torpedoed by a submarine, to Noumea.

Operating with other vessels of task force TF 31, President Jackson landed elements of the 3rd Marine Division at Empress Augusta Bay, Bougainville Island, 1 November. Seven days later, while en route back to that island with reinforcements, she was hit by a 550-pound (250 kg) bomb, which fortunately did not explode.

On 25 March 1944, President Jackson landed army, navy, and units on Emirau Island and in April, with Transport Division Two, she carried the 40th Division, to New Britain, and returned the 1st Marine Division to Russell Islands in the Solomons. With task force TF 53, in July, she landed elements of the 3rd Marine Division on Guam, 21 July, then evacuated casualties to Pearl Harbor and the United States. On 23 October the ship returned to duty with Transport Division 32 in the south and southwest Pacific areas.

While operating with TF 77, President Jackson landed elements of the 25th Infantry Division, U.S. Army, in the reinforcement landing at Lingayen Gulf 11 January 1945. On 21 February, while operating with TF 51, she landed elements of the 3rd Marine Division on Iwo Jima. Exposed to enemy counter-battery fire, she was hit once in a barrage of 37mm fire with minor damage and casualties. On 6 March she departed Iwo Jima with 515 casualties for Saipan and Noumea.

With army and navy casualties and miscellaneous passengers aboard, the transport sailed for the United States 7 May 1945. She got underway from San Francisco, 14 June and completed two round-trips to Manila before the cessation of hostilities which found her in drydock at Seattle, Washington. She then entered upon "Operation Magic Carpet" duty.

=== Post war period ===
President Jackson continued to operate with the U.S. Pacific Fleet until 1949, seeing service in both Japan and China. She was assigned to the Military Sea Transportation Service with her designation changed to T-AP-18, 22 October 1949.

On 7 February 1950 President Jackson, with cabin and troop passengers on board, got underway from San Francisco for Norfolk, Virginia, arriving 23 February. She returned to San Francisco 25 March, subsequently making round trips to Manila and Pearl Harbor.

=== Korean War and later years ===
With the outbreak of the Korean War President Jackson reported to the Commander, Amphibious Force, Pacific Fleet for operational control. Loading troops and equipment of the 2nd Battalion, 1st Marine Division at San Diego, she sailed 14 August for Japan, arriving Kobe 29 August to prepare for the invasion at Inchon. Departing Kobe 11 September with vessels of task group TG 90.2, she unloaded on the assault beaches of Inchon, served as a casualty receiving ship, then evacuated the casualties to Yokohama and San Francisco.

On 12 October President Jackson sailed from San Diego, carrying miscellaneous cargo for Japan. Returning to San Francisco, she subsequently called at Seattle, Washington, Alaska, Japan, and Korea. After another run to Alaska in April 1952, President Jackson departed San Francisco for Pago Pago to transport dependents from Pago Pago to Pearl Harbor, returning to San Francisco in August. During 1953 she operated between San Francisco, Alaska, and Pearl Harbor.

Carrying a full load of passengers and cargo for Yokohama, Japan, President Jackson got underway from San Francisco 25 January 1954, returning 23 February. After two roundtrips to Pearl Harbor, she departed for Alaska again 20 April with various units of the 30th Engineers Base Topographic Battalion, returning to San Francisco 14 May before making a second voyage to Alaska ending at San Francisco 5 June.

On 11 June President Jackson got underway for Yokohama carrying a full load of dependents and a small number of troop passengers, returning to San Francisco 8 July with passengers and cargo.

On 28 December she shifted to Todd Shipyard, Alameda, California, for phase one of inactivation. She was placed out of commission, in reserve, berthed at San Francisco, 6 July 1955. She was struck from the Navy List and transferred to the Maritime Commission 1 October 1958, sold for scrapping, 23 April 1973 and delivered, 15 May 1973, to N.W. Kennedy Ltd., Mitsui & Co., (Canada) Ltd.

President Jackson earned 8 battle stars for World War II service and 3 battle stars for Korean War service.
