= President Jackson-class attack transport =

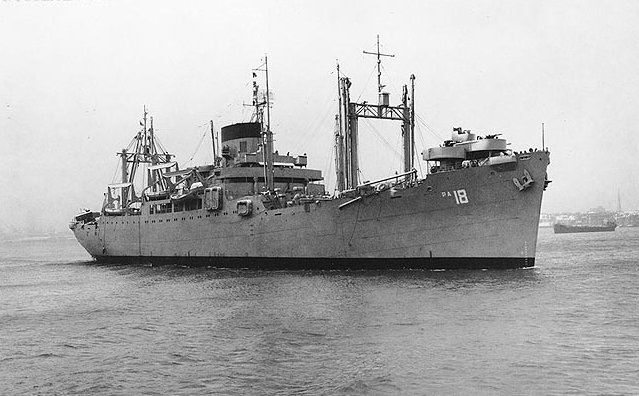
- USS President Jackson (APA-18) in 1947

Class overview
- Name: President Jackson class
- Builders: Newport News Shipbuilding
- Operators: United States Navy
- Preceded by: Crescent City class
- Succeeded by: USS John Penn (APA-23)
- Built: Oct 1939 - Aug 1942
- In commission: 19 Nov 1941 – 18 Jul 1955
- Completed: 7^{a}
- Lost: 1
- Retired: 6

General characteristics
- Type: MCV hull type C3-A, C3-P or C3-P&C
- Displacement: 9,500 tons (lt), 16,175 t.(fl)
- Length: 491 ft (150 m)
- Beam: (Most) 69 ft 6 in (21.18 m)
- Draft: (Most) 26 ft 6 in (8.08 m)
- Propulsion: Geared turbine drive, 2 x Babcock & Wilcox header-type boilers, single propeller, 8,500 horsepower
- Speed: 16.5–18 knots (19.0–20.7 mph; 30.6–33.3 km/h)
- Capacity: Troops: 68-76 officers, 1,197-1,312 enlisted; Cargo: 185,000 cu ft (5,200 m^{3}), 2,500–3,600 short tons (2,300–3,300 t)
- Complement: 35-58 officers, 472-535 enlisted
- Armament: (most ships): 4 x 3"/50 caliber dual-purpose guns, 2 x twin 40mm guns, 18 x single 20mm guns.

The President Jackson-class attack transport was a class of seven US Navy attack transport that saw service in World War II.

Like all attack transports, the purpose of the President Jackson class was to transport troops and their equipment to hostile shores, and once there to execute amphibious invasions. To perform this task, attack transports were equipped with a substantial number of integral landing craft, and an abundance of antiaircraft weaponry to protect themselves and their vulnerable cargo of troops from air attack in the battle zone.

== Background ==
The President Jackson class was based on the Maritime Commission's ubitiquous Type C3 hull - specifically on either the C3-A, C3-P or C3-P&C types. This hull design had been finalized in the late 1930s as a type suitable for both merchant cargo service and also for naval auxiliary service in the event of war.

Seven ships intended for commercial service with American President Lines were laid down by the Newport News Shipbuilding and Drydock Company of Newport News, Virginia between October 1939 and December 1940. The Maritime Commission acquired them all for military service before they were completed, but only five were initially handed to the Navy and designated President Jackson-class transports with "AP" hull numbers.. These five vessels were all later converted into attack transports and correspondingly reclassified with "APA" hull numbers.

The remaining two ships, President Polk (AP-103) and President Monroe (AP-104), were not transferred to the Navy until mid-1943. Unlike the other ships they were not assigned APA numbers, but instead kept their original AP classification. However, they appear to have been fitted out as attack transports nevertheless and assigned to similar duties. The Dictionary of American Naval Fighting Ships does not classify these latter two vessels as President Jackson class, but since both ships were originally sister ships of the other five and served in the same wartime role, the DANFS omission may be an error and the ships are listed as President Jacksons here.

The original five ships of the class were laid down between October 1939 and November 1940. Time between initial laying of the keel to commission for the first five ships varied from 16 to 30 months - an unusually long time, which suggests the shipyard may have had other priorities. The first five were commissioned between 19 November 1941 and 31 August 1942, while the remaining two were commissioned in July and August 1943 respectively.

== In service ==
Five ships of the class served exclusively in the Pacific Theatre. The other two, USS Thomas Stone (APA-29) and USS Thomas Jefferson (APA-30), were assigned for their first combat mission to Operation Torch, the Allied invasion of North Africa. This would prove to be Thomas Stone's one and only mission, as she was torpedoed, bombed, run aground and subsequently scrapped. Thomas Jefferson, however, went on to participate in the Sicilian, Italian and Normandy landings in the European Theatre, before being transferred to the Pacific to take part in the final major operation there, the Battle of Okinawa.

Immediately after the war the surviving ships of the class were assigned to transporting troops to occupation duties in newly conquered Japan and its former territories in China and Korea. They were then assigned to Operation Magic Carpet, the huge sealift organized to return demobilizing servicemen to the United States.

The Navy must have been satisfied with the performance of this class, because only President Polk and President Monroe were struck from the Navy list after Magic Carpet. Unlike the overwhelming majority of attack transports, the rest remained in commission for undertaking transport missions until the early 1950s. Two of them, USS President Jackson (APA-18) and Thomas Jefferson, went on to serve in the Korean War.

By mid-1955 however, the last ship of the class had been decommissioned, and the remaining units were struck from the Navy list on 1 October 1958. These were all sold for scrapping in early 1973, having each provided from 10 to 15 years of active service with the Navy.

== Footnotes ==
^a Assuming Polk and Monroe
