= USS William P. Biddle =

WWII US attack transport

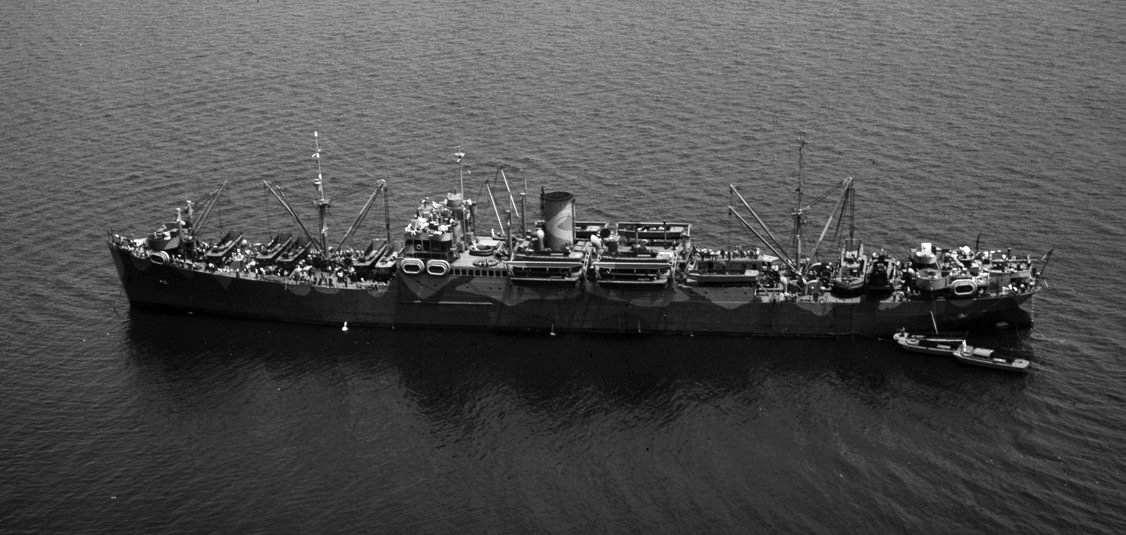
- William P. Biddle in June 1942

History

United States
- Name: USS William P. Biddle (APA-8)
- Namesake: William P. Biddle, USMC Commandant, 1910–1914
- Builder: Alameda Works Shipyard
- Launched: 20 October 1918
- Christened: War Surf
- Acquired: (by the Navy) 13 November 1940
- Commissioned: 3 February 1941
- Decommissioned: 9 April 1946
- In service: Commercial: 1920–1940; US Navy: 1940–1946
- Renamed: Eclipse (1919); City of Hamburg (1938); City of San Francisco (1939); USS William P. Biddle (November 1940)
- Reclassified: AP-15 to APA-8, 1 February 1943
- Stricken: 5 June 1946
- Identification: U.S. official number 217456
- Honours and awards: Seven battle stars for World War II service
- Fate: Scrapped, 1957

General characteristics
- Class & type: Heywood-class attack transport
- Displacement: 8,000 tons (lt) 14,450 t.(fl)
- Length: 507 ft
- Beam: 56 ft
- Draft: 25 ft 6 in
- Propulsion: 1 x De Laval geared turbine drive, 4 x Babcock & Wilcox header-type boilers, 1 propellers, designed shaft horsepower 9,500.
- Speed: 16.5 knots
- Capacity: Troops: 66 Officers, 990 Enlisted; Cargo: 150,000 cu ft, 2,900 tons
- Complement: Officers 45, Enlisted 515
- Armament: 1 x 5"/38 cal. dual purpose gun, 4 x 3"/50 cal DP guns, 4 x .50 cal (12.7 mm) machine guns. 1945: 4 x 3 in (76 mm)/50 cal. guns, 2 x twin 40mm gun mounts, 8 x twin 20mm gun mounts.

USS William P. Biddle (APA-8) was a Heywood-class attack transport in service with the United States Navy from 1941 to 1946. She was scrapped in 1957.

== History ==
The ship was one of eight 11,800 dwt hulls ordered by the British Shipping Controller under construction at Union Iron Works Alameda yard and requisitioned by the United States Shipping Board when the United States entered World War I. Ordered as War Surf the ship was renamed Eclipse, U.S. official number 217456, and completed in February 1919. Five of the ships, including Eclipse, were converted to electric drive before commercial operation for the USSB. The 3,000 horsepower electric motor was directly connected to the propeller shaft. Eclipse was the first of the five, the others being Archer, Independence, Invincible (See Empire Porpoise) and Victorious, entering service as the United States' first electric drive cargo ship making an initial successful voyage from New York in November 1920 to the Dutch East Indies.

=== Commercial service ===
Eclipse was owned by the Shipping Board from 1919 and operated under the Board from 1920 until the ship was acquired by the Baltimore Mail Steamship Company, of Baltimore, Maryland, in 1931. Reconstructed at the Federal Shipbuilding and Drydock Company, Kearny, New Jersey, to the lines drawn up by the noted naval architect firm of Gibbs & Cox, Eclipse was lengthened by 46'6"; accommodations were installed for 81 tourist-class passengers; and the ship was re-engined to give her a substantial boost in power and speed.

Renamed City of Hamburg, the steamship performed passenger, fast freight, and mail service between the terminal ports of Baltimore, Hampton Roads, Le Havre and Hamburg with the Baltimore Mail Steamship Company from 1938 to 1939, when the United States government refused further subsidies for the firm's international operations.

City of Hamburg was acquired by the Panama-Pacific Line and renamed City of San Francisco in 1939, and she operated between New York and San Francisco until acquired by the Navy on 13 November 1940.

=== U.S. Navy service ===
Simultaneously placed in commission "in ordinary" as William P. Biddle (AP-15), at Oakland, California the ship was taken in hand for extensive conversion at the Moore Dry Dock Company, of Oakland. Over the ensuing months, the erstwhile passenger-cargo vessel was transformed to a transport, with the dockyard workers sometimes putting in 24-hour shifts. William P. Biddle – now sporting the peacetime Navy gray – was ultimately placed in full commission under the command of Captain Campbell Dallas Edgar on 3 February 1941.

Shifted to the Mare Island Navy Yard, Vallejo California, soon thereafter, William P. Biddle underwent further alterations there through mid-February. She ran her post repair trials in San Francisco Bay on the 21st and, two days later, shifted to San Diego, California, where she embarked marines of the 7th Defense Battalion, USMC. The transport then departed San Diego on 27 February, bound for the Hawaiian Islands.

After a two-day layover at Pearl Harbor, William P. Biddle got underway at 1040 on 9 March. An hour later, she joined the light cruiser USS Concord (CL-10) (with Commander, Cruiser Division 3 embarked) – her escort for the voyage to Samoa. On the 15th, the two ships arrived at Pago Pago, where William P. Biddle disembarked 24 officers and 405 enlisted men of the composite infantry-artillery unit that was the first unit of the Fleet Marine Force to serve in the Southern Hemisphere during World War II. After fueling Concord at Pago Pago, William P. Biddle and her escort sailed for the Hawaiian Islands on the 20th.

The transport then spent three days at Pearl Harbor before pushing on for the west coast arriving at San Diego on 4 April. She subsequently took part in maneuvers off San Clemente Island, conducting landing exercises at Pyramid Cove, into May. Meanwhile, that spring, plans to reinforce the Fleet Marine Forces of the Atlantic Fleet for the possible occupation of Martinique were proceeding apace. On 24 May, General Thomas Holcomb, the Commandant of the Marine Corps, drew upon the manpower resources of the 2nd Marine Division, selecting the 6th Marine Regiment (Col. Leo D. Hermle, USMC, in command) for "temporary shore duty beyond the seas."

Brought up to strength by drafts from the 2d and 8th Regiments, and joined by reinforcing tank, artillery, and service elements, the 6th Marine Regiment embarked in William P. Biddle, as well as transports USS Heywood (AP-12) and USS Fuller (AP-14), plus high speed transports USS Manley (APD-1), USS McKean (APD-5), USS Stringham (APD-6), and USS Little (APD-4). William P. Biddle took on board 27 officers and 497 enlisted men from the 6th and 2nd Defense Battalions, USMC, while moored at the Long Pier, Destroyer Base, San Diego.

At 1826 on Memorial Day 1941, the transport, flying Commodore Braisted's pennant as ComTransBaseFor, departed San Diego, bound for that duty "beyond the seas." En route, William P. Biddle fueled Little and arrived at the Pacific entrance to the Panama Canal at 2048 on 9 June. Less than an hour later, Stringham transferred five officers and 51 enlisted marines from "K" Company to the transport before she began the transit of the canal. William P. Biddle passed through the last set of locks – Pedro Miguel – shortly before midnight on the 9th and moored at Cristóbal at 0512 on the 10th to take on fuel.

Slipping out to sea at 2211 from Limon Bay, Cristobal, in company with sister ships Fuller and Heywood and escorted by the venerable "flush-deckers", destroyers USS Tattnall (DD-125) and USS Barry (DD-248), William P. Biddle sailed for Charleston, South Carolina, the assembly point for an expeditionary force. While the ships were en route, however, changes in the ultimate disposition of the troops had occurred. Late that spring, British Prime Minister Winston Churchill had come to President Franklin D. Roosevelt with a request for assistance. Britain, feeling that her back was to the wall, wanted the United States to send troops to Iceland. In response to this request, the President turned to the Navy and discovered that a reinforced infantry regiment, the 6th Marines earmarked for possible expeditionary duty, was already en route from the west coast – a tailor-made Iceland occupation force.

The most probable mission for these marines had been either the seizure of Martinique or the occupation of the Azores. However, intelligence indicated that Germany was about to invade Russia. As a result, President Roosevelt suspended the planning for the Azores operation and instead decided to assume the guardianship over Iceland. Meanwhile, William P. Biddle and her consorts continued on their voyage from San Diego. The transports cleared the canal and turned north, then passed the western end of Cuba, and arrived at Charleston on 15 June. The next day, the 1st Marine Brigade (Provisional) came into existence, with Brigadier General John Marston in command.

Six days later, with the last of the equipment loaded, the convoy sailed for Newfoundland. William P. Biddle – as part of the convoy now escorted by a strong contingent of escorts ranging from battleships to destroyers – anchored in Placentia Bay, Argentia, on 28 June. On 1 July, the government of Iceland issued an invitation for the United States to land troops; and, by dawn on the 2nd, the convoy was en route to conduct the landing on the strategic island in the North Atlantic.

William P. Biddle arrived at Reykjavík on 7 July and commenced disembarking the 3rd Battalion, 6th Marines. Hitler had ordered his U-boats to spare American shipping; but the Americans – unaware of this German policy – hurried to unload the four transports and two accompanying cargo ships. Since there was little local labor, the marines furnished the working parties. Round-the-clock effort was immeasurably aided by the nearly 24 hours of daylight prevalent at that time of year.

The landing was completed by 11 July, and William P. Biddle and her consorts soon sailed for home leaving the 1st Marine Brigade (Provisional) to establish the base that would be their home on the bleak, treeless island for the next eight months.

William P. Biddle arrived at the Norfolk Navy Yard on 22 July for post-voyage repairs and upkeep. She then made one more voyage to Iceland, departing Norfolk on 14 August and arriving at Staten Island, New York, the next day. There, she embarked Army troops at the beginning of September and got underway on 5 September, arriving at Reykjavík on the 16th.

=== World War II ===
Departing Iceland on the 25th, William P. Biddle arrived at the New York Navy Yard on 6 October. After repairs there, the transport headed south and arrived at Hampton Roads on 23 October. She operated in Lynnhaven Roads and Hampton Roads, training in amphibious warfare tactics and techniques until 17 January 1942. During that time, tensions in the Pacific had reached their peak when a Japanese carrier force attacked Pearl Harbor on 7 December 1941 and pushed the United States over the brink of a rapidly eroding neutrality into war.

The transport departed Norfolk on 17 January 1942, arrived at the Army docks at New York the next day, and remained in the New York area until shifting back to Norfolk at the end of the month. For the rest of that winter, the ship carried troops – taking marines to San Juan, Puerto Rico, and Army troops to Guantanamo Bay – before entering the Norfolk Navy Yard on 1 March for reconversion. William P. Biddle received an augmented antiaircraft battery and new davits to accommodate more up-to-date landing craft before she departed the yard on 15 April.

==== Operation Torch ====
She trained in the Chesapeake Bay area from 16 April to 13 October before getting underway for North Africa on 24 October as part of Operation Torch, the first major American combat landing in the European-African-Middle Eastern Area. The transport sailed as part of Task Group (TG) 34.9, the "Center Attack Group" – commanded by Capt. Robert Emmett – which consisted of a dozen troop transports and three cargo ships. Embarked in the transports were the Army's 3rd Infantry Division, the 1st Battalion of the 67th Armored Regiment, and assorted special units. There were 19,810 men riding in those ships, along with 79 light M3 Stuart tanks.

The task assigned TG 34.9 was a pivotal one, since it was to be launched against the key port of Fedhala, to the northeast of the seaport of Casablanca, on the coast of French Morocco. William P. Biddle arrived off the Casablanca-Fedhala sector at 0011 on 8 November, heaving-to in the transport area and hoisting out her boats and tank lighters. At 0445, the first troops began storming ashore. By 1513, men in William P. Biddle noted that the American flag had been raised over the beachhead.

The transport continued her unloading evolutions into the following day, a slow process due to lack of boats and lighters, many of which had become stranded on the beaches by the low tide. While the ship herself saw little action, four of her landing boats did. Carrying 113 officers and men of a Headquarters Military Police (MP) company, those four craft set out for Beach "Yellow" at about 0400 on the 11th. Two blundered into French waters off Casablanca where a French patrol craft raked the boats with machine gunfire, killing the MP company commander in the fusillade. Both American craft sank, and the survivors were taken prisoner. The other two boats returned to the ship in the forenoon and reported the fate of their less fortunate sisters. The lost landing craft had carried three officers and 84 men.

When planes of unknown nationality appeared later that day, the transport group – taking no chances – fired at them and William P. Biddle contributed her share of fire. Unloading operations proceeded over the ensuing days, until French resistance ceased. On the 11th, German U-boat torpedoes struck the transport USS Joseph Hewes (AP-50), the oiler USS Winooski (AO-38), and the destroyer USS Hambleton (DD-455). Joseph Hewes sank at 2050, and boats from William P. Biddle rescued one officer and 12 men, brought them aboard the transport, and berthed and clothed them.

The next day, when the transports USS Hugh L. Scott (AP-43) USS Edward Rutledge (AP-52), and USS Tasker H. Bliss (AP-42) were torpedoed, William P. Biddle's boats again participated in rescue efforts and later landed survivors at Fedhala. After shifting to the secured port of Casablanca to unload more cargo on the 16th, the transport set course for the United States the next day. Her performance during Operation Torch had been impressive, eliciting praise from Commander, Transport Division 1 and Commander TG 34.9. The latter, Capt. R. E. M. Emmet remarked simply: "The Biddle has developed into a smart ship."

William P. Biddle reached Hampton Roads on 30 November and received repairs and alterations at the Norfolk Navy Yard between 6 and 17 December; fueled at Craney Island, and shifted to local Army embarkation piers on the 18th to embark the men and gear of Construction Battalion 40 (Seabees). Standing out of Hampton Roads two days after Christmas of 1942 as part of TF 39, William P. Biddle headed south; transited the Panama Canal on 3 January 1943; and made port at Nouméa, New Caledonia, on 27 January. Pushing on two days later, the ship then called at Espiritu Santo in the New Hebrides from 3 to 5 February before she headed for home. During that period, on 1 February, William P. Biddle was reclassified an attack transport, APA-8.

William P. Biddle soon headed home. She retransited the Panama Canal on 24 February, steamed north via Norfolk, and arrived back at New York on 11 March. In keeping with her new designation, the ship entered the Todd-Erie Basin Yard, Brooklyn, New York, to be overhauled and outfitted as an attack transport. Alterations were made from 12 March to 21 April to the ship's armament and to her boat equipment to enable her to function better in her new role. Departing New York on 24 April, William P. Biddle stood into Norfolk harbor the following day, where, in the ensuing days, she embarked Army troops at the Army port of embarkation. Departing Norfolk on 8 June, the attack transport headed once more for the Mediterranean.

==== Invasion of Sicily ====
William P. Biddle arrived at Oran on 22 June and trained off that port in amphibious exercises on the 24th and 25th. Soon thereafter, she joined the veritable Allied armada bound for Sicily, that strategic island on the "toe" of the Italian "boot." William P. Biddle, as part of Task Force (TF) 85 under the overall direction of Rear Admiral Alan G. Kirk, formed part of TG 85.2, Attack Group 2, attached to Transport Division 5. Together with attack transports USS Charles Carroll (APA-28) and USS Thomas Jefferson (APA-30), transport USS Susan B. Anthony (AP-72), attack cargo ships USS Arcturus (AKA-1)) and USS Procyon (AKA-2), and five LST's, William P. Biddle landed troops at landing area "Cent", the easternmost beachhead established on 10 July, and then troops, supported by naval gunfire, pushed inland.

By 17 August, when Allied forces entered the city of Messina, Sicily was secured. William P. Biddle, however, did not see the end of the campaign; she sailed from Scoglitti on 12 July and reached Oran on the 15th. There, she took on board German and Italian prisoners of war for transportation to the United States, departing Oran on the 22nd bound for Newport News, Virginia. Making port on 3 August, the attack transport remained in the Tidewater area only briefly before getting underway for the west coast.

==== Gilbert Islands campaign ====
Embarking Marine Corps units at Guantanamo Bay on 28 August, en route, William P. Biddle shifted to Panama on the 30th to pick up Army troops, transited the canal, and arrived at San Diego on 9 September. Then, after taking on stores and provisions at San Francisco between 12 and 20 September, the attack transport headed for the Hawaiian Islands. After a brief respite in Hawaiian waters, William P. Biddle departed Honolulu on 1 October and arrived at Samoa on the 8th. Three days later, the attack transport sailed for New Zealand and arrived at Wellington on the 18th.

She conducted landing exercises with marines at Hawkes Bay, New Zealand, between 20 and 22 October – to prepare for the upcoming landings at Tarawa – before returning to Wellington. The attack transport departed that port on 1 November, transporting units of the 2nd Marines, bound for Efate, the staging area for the assault on the Gilbert Islands. After staying at Efate from 8 to 13 November, the ship sortied for Tarawa on the 13th as part of TF-53.

William P. Biddle and her sister transports closed the target atoll while the ships that would provide gunfire support for the landings blasted Japanese positions ashore from 16 to 19 November, "softening up" the island for the landings. On 20 November, the first troops began heading ashore with the 2nd Marine Division landing on Betio Island in the face of stiff resistance. During the early phase of the landings, at 0550 on the 20th, Japanese shore batteries had opened fire on the transports; five shells had fallen near William P. Biddle, shrapnel wounding one man. At 0558, the transports then moved out of range of the guns.

After bitter fighting, the marines had established a small beachhead by sundown. By 1130 on the 23d, Betio was secured; five days later, Major General Julian C. Smith announced that the remaining enemy forces on Tarawa had been wiped out. The assault, however, had cost 990 marines killed and 2,296 wounded. The Japanese fought, literally, to the last man: 4,690 men drew their last breath for their emperor on Tarawa. Soon thereafter, having delivered her mottle-garbed marines to the beaches of Tarawa, William P. Biddle departed the Gilberts and paused briefly at Pearl Harbor on 2 December on her way to the west coast.

==== Invasion of the Marshalls ====
Arriving at San Diego on the 13th, the attack transport remained in the vicinity of the southern California coast for the remainder of 1943 and into mid-January 1944, embarking elements of the 4th Marine Regiment and dividing her time between a dry-docking at San Diego and amphibious exercises off San Clemente Island. William P. Biddle subsequently embarked marines at San Diego and departed that port on 13 January 1944 bound for Hawaii. She refueled at Lahaina Roads, off the island of Maui, before she proceeded on to the Marshall Islands.

On "D day", 31 January, the attack transport arrived off the beachheads to see the glowing fires set by the shore bombardment of the supporting heavy ships off shore. During the initial stage of Operation Flintlock, William P. Biddle was the first transport to be 100 percent unloaded. After departing the Marshalls on 4 February, the attack transport went to Funafuti in the Ellice Islands and remained there from 9 to 13 February.

==== Solomon Islands campaign ====
Following a rest at anchor off Nouméa from 19 February to 8 March, William P. Biddle commenced an extended series of movements that ultimately took her to Guadalcanal on 11 March, Tulagi on 12 March, Kwajalein on 4 April; back to Guadalcanal with the marines of the 22nd Division embarked on 13 April; to Cape Gloucester, New Britain, on 28 April with Army troops of the 40th Infantry Division; to the Russells with the 1st Marine Division on 3 May; to Tulagi on 4 May; and to Guadalcanal on the 10th.

From 10 May to 3 June, William P. Biddle conducted exercises in the Solomons, preparing for the upcoming push against Guam. With the 1st Battalion, 22nd Marines, embarked, William P. Biddle departed the Solomons on 4 June and arrived at Kwajalein four days later. From that island, the transport sortied on the 12th to serve as a floating reserve for the Saipan operation. When it became evident that her services would not be required in that operation, William P. Biddle was released from those duties on 3 July and retired to Eniwetok in the Marshalls.

Departing Eniwetok on 17 July, William P. Biddle turned her bow toward the island of Guam. She arrived in the transport area off the town of Agat, Guam, at 0615 on 21 July. She took part in the initial assault landings there, putting ashore a major part of Combat Landing Team 1, 22d Regiment, 1st Provisional Marine Brigade, with their equipment, on Beach "Yellow One", immediately south of Agat, on the west coast of Guam. She took on board casualties from the fighting ashore on 21 July, later transferring patients to attack transports USS Leedstown (APA-56) and USS Fayette (APA-43) before she departed the transport area on the 25th, bound for Eniwetok where she arrived four days later.

==== Invasion of Leyte ====
After periods at the Pearl Harbor Navy Yard and at Honolulu, William P. Biddle returned again to Eniwetok on 25 September before she ultimately shifted to Manus, in the Admiralties, to prepare for the ship's sixth major combat operation – the return to the Philippines and the invasion of the island of Leyte. Attached to transport group "Baker" (TG 79.4) of the Southern Attack Force, William P. Biddle transported and landed elements and equipment of the Army's XXIV Corps on Beach "Blue One" on the east coast of Leyte.

She arrived in her assigned anchorage in the transport area at 0840 on 20 October and soon hoisted out her boats and lowered them. By 0855, all of her boats were waterborne. The ship then assisted other amphibious assault ships in the vicinity – attack transports USS Bolivar (APA-34) and USS Clay (APA-39), transport USS Comet (AP-166), and attack cargo ship USS Capricornus (AKA-57), lending her boats to assist those ships in unloading.

Although two enemy planes had been sighted near the transport area during the frequent air raid alerts, they were out of range and neither the ships nor her boat's guns were fired. The only casualties suffered by the ship were three men wounded by shrapnel and one by wounds suffered when a mortar projectile hit the LCVP in which he was serving.

Leaving Leyte behind on 24 October, William P. Biddle shifted to Hollandia, Dutch New Guinea, arriving there four days later. After embarking elements of the 346th Harbor Craft Company and the Army's 673d Machine Gun Battery at Hollandia, the transport shifted to Morotai, where she spent five days, from 5 to 10 November, loading 304 tons of cargo – rations, organizational gear, and vehicles – and elements of the 310th Bomb Wing, USAAF.

William P. Biddle departed Morotai on the 10th, arrived at Leyte three days later, and anchored off the east coast of the island. A solitary "Jill" had attacked her formation 100 miles (160 km) east of Leyte Gulf, but gunfire from landing ship vehicle USS Catskill (LSV-1) splashed the intruder before he could do any damage.

After landing those resupply units in the San Jose, Leyte, area, William P. Biddle shifted, in succession, to Manus from 20 to 27 November, Cape Gloucester, New Britain, from 28 November to 10 December, and back to Manus from 11 to 16 December, before she conducted training operations at Lae, New Guinea, from 16 to 21 December. William P. Biddle subsequently returned to Manus, where she spent the last 10 days of the year.

==== Invasion of Luzon ====
With troops from the 1st Battalion, 185th Infantry, 40th Division (Reinforced), USA, embarked, William P. Biddle sailed from the Admiralties on 31 December 1944, bound once more for the Philippines. This operation would be the last combat operation in which the ship would participate in World War II, the landings at Lingayen Gulf, Luzon.

Arriving in the transport area at 0712 on 9 January 1945, William P. Biddle commenced debarkation of her troops at 0745; but, two minutes later, an enemy plane attacked the formation of transports. William P. Biddle's after 40-millimeter Bofors mount flung out 72 rounds; during that time, the surrounding ships opened fire as well. During the attack, two of the ship's crew, in exposed gun stations, were wounded by shrapnel, probably from "friendly" gunfire thrown up at the attacking plane.

William P. Biddle completed debarking her assault waves by 0905 and finished unloading the cargo and troop working parties at 1740. At 1815, the attack transport got underway and retired from the area, bound for Leyte. William P. Biddle called at Leyte from 6 to 7 February, Mindoro from 9 to 10 February, and Leyte from 12 to 15 February, before she arrived at Pearl Harbor on 18 March. Her Hawaiian stop was only a brief one for, after 14 months continuous duty outside the continental United States, William P. Biddle was San Francisco bound on 21 March.

==== Training and transport missions ====
After a yard availability at the Moore Dry Dock Company, Oakland, from 29 March to 1 June, William P. Biddle conducted refresher training out of San Diego before she returned via San Francisco to Pearl Harbor on 5 July. Shifting to Honolulu on the 6th, the attack transport subsequently got underway within a week, on 12 July, for the Marshalls. After a brief stop at Eniwetok on the 21st, the ship pushed on for Ulithi, arriving there on the 25th, for a one-day layover on her voyage to the Philippines.

Arriving at Leyte on the 28th, William P. Biddle departed that island on 4 August, with casualties and patients – both Army and Navy – embarked. Arriving back at Ulithi on 8 August, William P. Biddle was at sea when news of the Japanese capitulation came through. She subsequently arrived at San Pedro on 26 August.

=== Post-war ===
William P. Biddle operated between the Philippines and the west coast of the United States into the autumn, transporting Army and Navy replacements, casualties, and separatees, as part of the Operation Magic Carpet fleet. Putting into San Pedro on 13 December 1945, William P. Biddle brought her active transport career to a close.

==== Decommissioning and fate ====
On 3 January 1946, after several moves between west coast ports, the veteran attack transport got underway from San Pedro and headed for the east coast. After transiting the Panama Canal soon thereafter, William P. Biddle arrived at Norfolk on 9 February and was placed out of commission there on 9 April 1946. Struck from the Navy List on 5 June 1946, William P. Biddle was turned over to the Maritime Commission at Lee Hall, Virginia, on 19 July 1946. Placed in the reserve fleet in the James River, William P. Biddle remained there until she was towed away and scrapped in 1957.

== Awards ==
William P. Biddle earned seven battle stars for her World War II service.
