= USS Neville =

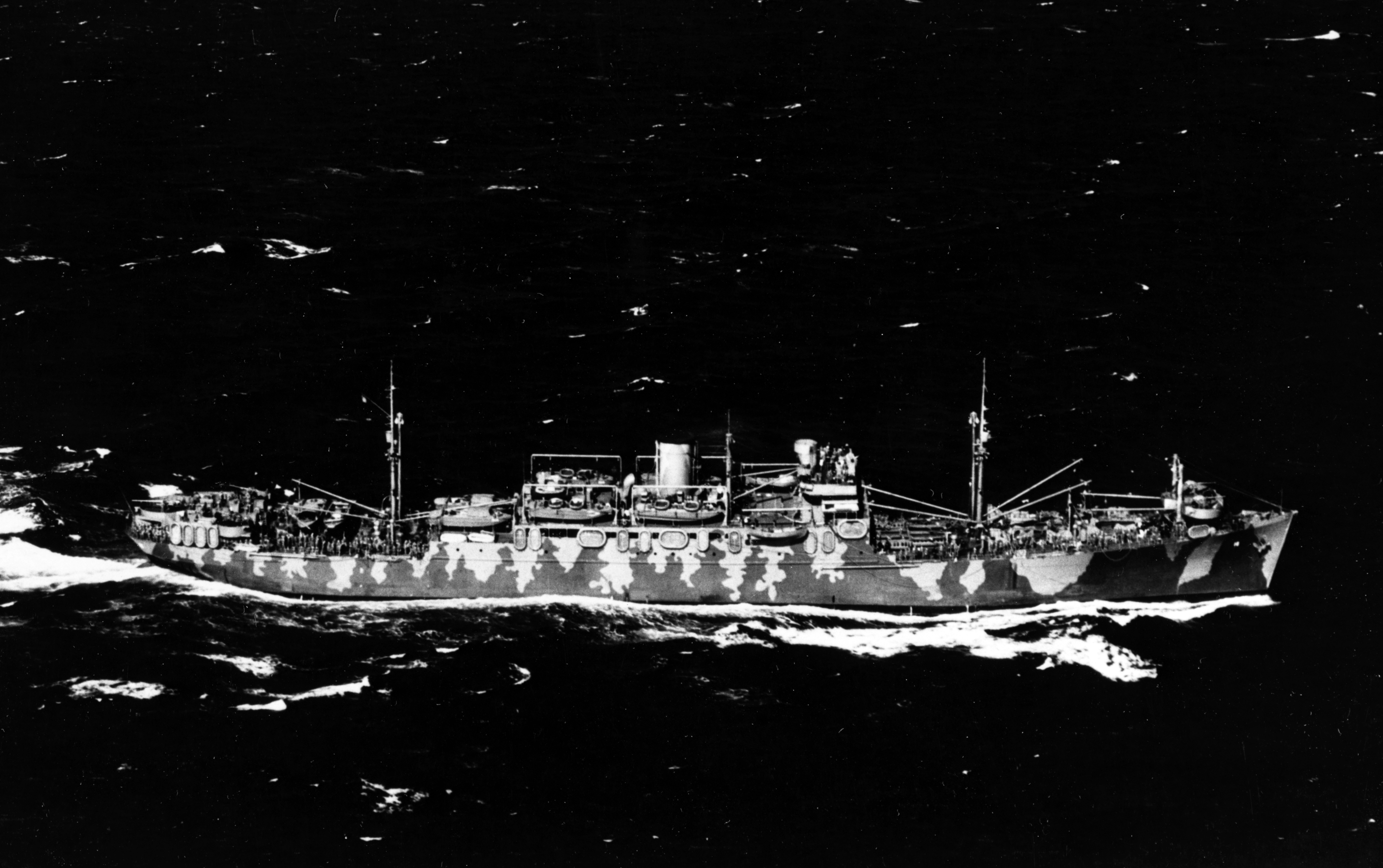
- Neville in February 1942

History

United States
- Name: Independence 1918-1931; City of Norfolk 1931-1940; Neville 1940-1946; City of Norfolk 1946-1948; Independence 1948
- Namesake: Wendell Cushing Neville
- Ordered: as War Harbour
- Builder: Bethlehem Alameda Works Shipyard, Alameda, California
- Launched: 4 July 1918
- Commissioned: 18 November 1918
- Decommissioned: 20 March 1919
- Fate: Returned to the United States Shipping Board for Merchant Marine service
- Acquired: 14 December 1940
- Recommissioned: 14 May 1941, as Neville (AP-16)
- Reclassified: APA-9, 1 February 1943
- Stricken: 15 August 1946
- Honors and awards: 5 battle stars (World War II)
- Fate: Scrapped, 1957

General characteristics
- Class & type: Heywood-class attack transport
- Displacement: 8,000 long tons (8,128 t) light; 14,450 long tons (14,682 t) full
- Length: 507 ft (155 m)
- Beam: 56 ft (17 m)
- Draft: 25 ft 6 in (7.77 m)
- Propulsion: 4 × Babcock & Wilcox header-type boilers, De Laval steam turbine, single screw, 9,500 hp (7,084 kW)
- Speed: 16 knots (30 km/h; 18 mph)
- Capacity: 145,000 cubic feet, 1,800 tons cargo
- Troops: 1150 men
- Complement: 50 officers, 524 enlisted
- Armament: 4 × single 3"/50 caliber guns; 2 × twin 40 mm AA guns; 16 × single 20 mm guns

USS Neville was originally a cargo vessel ordered by the British for WW I under the name War Harbour and requisitioned by the United States Shipping Board (USSB) before completion. The ship was renamed Independence, completed, delivered to the Navy and commissioned on 16 November 1918 to see brief service with the Naval Overseas Transportation Service (NOTS).

After decommissioning 20 March 1919 the ship with four sisters was converted to turbine electric drive in 1920 to operate as one of the first U.S. cargo vessels with electric drive. The ship operated commercially under the USSB until sold in 1931to the Baltimore Mail Steamship Company. After being rebuilt and renamed City of Norfolk the ship served commercially until again acquired and commissioned in 1940 by the Navy as Nevile, first designated as the transport AP-16 and then converted into an attack transport and designated APA-9 in service until 1946. She was returned to the War Shipping Administration (WSA) on 16 July 1946 and scrapped in 1957.

== History ==
The ship was ordered in 1918 as War Harbour for the British Shipping Controller, London, and under construction at Bethlehem Steel Company's Alameda, California yard as hull #162 when requisitioned and completed by the USSB as Independence assigned official number 217172.

=== U.S. Navy service (1918-1919) ===
She was acquired by the Navy and commissioned on 16 November 1918, assigned to the NOTS Army account, making one Atlantic crossing from New York to England with foodstuffs in 1919. After World War I service, she decommissioned on 20 March 1919 and was returned to the USSB for US Merchant Marine service.

=== Commercial service (1920-1940) ===
In 1920 Independence was one of five sister ships, the others being Archer, Invincible (See Empire Porpoise), Eclipse (first converted and the first U.S. electric drive cargo ship) and Victorious, converted to electric drive before commercial operation for the USSB. The 3,000 horsepower electric motor was directly connected to the propeller shaft. The ship was sold to the Baltimore Mail Steamship Company, rebuilt and renamed City of Norfolk in 1931 operating to Europe. After the Maritime Commission ruled the Baltimore Mail routes were a non-essential service in 1937 the ships were sold in 1938 to the Panama Pacific Line for operation between the U.S. East and West coasts. The ship was reacquired by the Navy on 14 December 1940. Converted by the Willamette Iron and Steel Works, Portland, Oregon, she recommissioned as Neville (AP-16), on 14 May 1941.

=== U.S. Navy service (1940-1957) ===
On 18 June 1941, Neville reported for duty with the Atlantic Fleet and for the remaining days of quasi-peace in 1941 transported military and naval personnel to various points along the East Coast and in the Caribbean.

==== World War II ====
On 7 December 1941 she was at San Juan, en route from Trinidad to New York. Within the month, however, she was conducting landing exercises with Army units along the Virginia coast. Detached from that duty in mid-February, she embarked Army and Navy personnel and equipment and departed the East Coast, on 19 February 1942, on the first trans-oceanic run of her second world war.

She completed the round-trip voyage to Belfast, including a stop at Glasgow, on 25 March, at New York, disembarked RAF, RCAF, and British Merchant Navy personnel, and then continued on to Norfolk for voyage repairs. At the same time, she received 20 mm guns and more modern landing craft for use in her new operational territory, the Pacific.

===== Guadalcanal =====
Neville departed Hampton Roads, on 10 April, and steaming south with TF 38, transited the Panama Canal, on the 18th, becoming a unit of TransDiv 8, ServRon 4, Pacific Fleet. Anchoring in Fanui Bay, Bora Bora, on 4 May, she discharged her Army and Seabee passengers and proceeded on to Wellington, New Zealand, where she remained until 22 July. Then, with units of the 1st Marine Division embarked, she headed toward the Fiji Islands to rendezvous with other Allied vessels assigned to "Operation Watchtower", the assaults on Tulagi and Guadalcanal.

At 0630, on 7 August, Neville arrived in her assigned transport area off beach "Blue" on Tulagi. Seven minutes later she lowered her boats and Raider groups were dispatched. At 0730 Marine Combat Team 2 was debarked into landing boats which put them ashore soon after "H-hour", 0800. Despite increasingly stiff opposition, all assigned waves had been landed by 1012. By 1320, aerial resistance, in the form of bombers and fighters, had been added to the well developed Japanese defenses in the Tulagi-Gavutu-Tanambogo area. The long battle for the Solomons had begun.

Neville remained in the area through the 9th, witnessing, from a distance, the devastation wrought off Savo Island on that date. On the 13th, she arrived at Nouméa, New Caledonia, whence she continued on to Wellington to take on reinforcements. Returning to the combat area on 26 October, she participated in the landings at Aola Bay on 4 November, and then departed to take up transport duties in the New Caledonia-New Hebrides area. At the end of the month, she again returned to Guadalcanal, discharged supplies and reinforcements, took on personnel to be evacuated, and headed south east. After stopping at Espiritu Santo to disembark her evacuees, she proceeded to San Diego, arriving on 4 January 1943 for availability.

===== North Africa =====
On 14 February, Neville, now redesignated APA-9 (effective 1 February), a Heywood-class attack transport, stood out from San Diego en route back to the Atlantic. She arrived at Norfolk on 10 March, and after amphibious training in the Chesapeake Bay area, sailed on 8 June for North Africa to prepare for the Sicilian invasion. By 10 July she was off Scoglitti with "Cent" Force as it landed Army units on either side of that fishing town. Assigned to the Northern Group, Neville's boats delivered units of the 45th "Thunderbird" Division to "Red" beach, near the mouth of the Acate River, at 0434. Despite being the last group to get away from their transport, heavy surf, and indefinite landmarks, they were the first to touch down on the beach. With the last wave in by 0640, the task of discharging cargo was begun. On the afternoon of the 12th, the APA departed the assault area and returned to Oran, whence she sailed, on the 22nd, for the United States.

===== Gilbert and Marshall Islands =====
Neville arrived at Newport News, Virginia, 3 August, only to depart again on the 23rd, once more assigned to the Pacific. By the end of September she was engaged in intensive landing exercises in the Hawaiian Islands. On 10 November she stood out of Honolulu and sailed for the Gilberts with troops of the 27th Division and a platoon of Marine Raiders, 5th Amphibious Corps, embarked.

On the morning of 20 November, Marine and Army units were landed on Tarawa and Makin. At 0642 Neville dispatched her Marines to secure Katubam but kept her Army units on board for later landings on the lagoon side of Butaritari. By 1015 the first of eight waves had been dispatched, landing on beach "Yellow" at 1040 under an opposing storm of small arms fire. Cargo discharge operations, begun later in the day, continued through the 22nd. On the 23rd, Neville departed the transport area only to return the next day to take on survivors from Liscome Bay (CVE-56) before returning to Pearl Harbor. From Pearl Harbor, the transport steamed to Bremerton, Washington, underwent repairs, and then headed south to San Diego, arriving on 31 December.

With the new year, 1944, Neville received new landing craft, fresh boat crews, and orders to join Trans Div 30 at Pearl Harbor. She arrived in Hawaii on 9 January, again took on units of the 27th Division, and on the 23rd got underway, with TG 51.1, the Kwajalein Attack Force Reserve Group. Neville sighted Kwajalein on the 31st, but maneuvered east of the Atoll until entering the lagoon on 2 February. There she engaged in debarkation drills in preparation for the assault on Eniwetok. On 11 February, the uncommitted Kwajalein Reserve Group was dissolved and reformed as the Eniwetok Expeditionary Group. Four days later the group, TG 51.11, sortied from Kwajalein.

On the 17th, Neville entered Eniwetok lagoon and prepared to land her troops on the main objective, Engebi, the following morning. The first waves hit the beaches at 0844. Neville's boats, used on the 17th and on the morning of the 18th, were not called on to transport her own passengers to the beaches until after the vessel had shifted to Transport Area 3. Then, at 1609, troops were debarked for landings on Eniwetok Island. For the next three days, she remained off Eniwetok, sending supplies to the beaches and taking on casualties. On the 23rd, she shifted to the Parry Island transport area, where she remained for four days. APA–9 then got underway for Kwajalein, Pearl Harbor, and, ultimately, San Francisco. On 8 April, she returned to Hawaii to conduct amphibious training exercises with Marine personnel in preparation for "Operation Forager", the push into the Marianas.

===== Marianas =====
Assigned in May to TransDiv 10, Neville departed Honolulu on 30 May, and steamed west with TF 52. Soon after 0630 on 15 June, she was in her assigned transport area, 7 miles (11 km) off Saipan. By 0700 her boats had departed for a demonstration feint off Mutcho Point, Garapan. Her boats reloaded in mid-morning, she shifted to the Charan Kanoa transport area. At 1103 she received orders to send her troops in to beach "Green Two". The first boats shoved off for the departure line at 1135 and by 1340 the job was completed.

From the 15th until the 18th, the transport retired each night to positions just off the islands of Saipan and Tinian. From the 19th to the 21st, as the Battle of the Philippine Sea raged, she cruised 75–100 miles east-northeast of Saipan, then returned to complete off-loading cargo at Saipan. On the 23rd, she turned her bow toward Eniwetok, where Japanese POWs were taken on board. Next sailing to Kwajalein, she embarked ambulatory casualties, and on 5 July joined a convoy headed for Pearl Harbor. There, on 13 July, she delivered her prisoners, and the next day continued her voyage, arriving at San Diego on the 21st.

On her arrival at San Diego, Neville was assigned to TU 13.1.1, TransDiv 1, then conducting amphibious training exercises for assault troops. From 3 January 1945 until 15 August, she operated as a training ship for APA crews, and then, after the cessation of hostilities, resumed duties as a transport to ferry fresh troops to former Japanese islands in the South Pacific and bring home veterans.

=== Decommissioning and fate ===
On 15 January 1946, the World War I transport departed California for the last time. Steaming to the East Coast, she arrived at Boston on 5 February to begin inactivation, decommissioning on 30 April. Transferred to War Shipping Administration on 16 July, she was struck from the Navy List on 15 August 1946, and scrapped in 1957.

== Awards ==
Neville received 5 battle stars for her World War II service.
