= 5th Antiaircraft Artillery Battalion =

- Active: 1 Dec 1940 – Nov 1945
- Country: United States of America
- Branch: United States Marine Corps
- Type: Air Defense/Coastal Defense
- Size: ~1100 men
- Engagements: World War II; *Gilbert Islands Campaign; *Battle of Okinawa

Commanders
- Current commander: N/A
- Notable commanders: George F. Good Jr.

The 5th Antiaircraft Artillery Battalion (5th AAA Bn) was a United States Marine Corps antiaircraft unit that served during World War II. Formed in 1940 as the 5th Defense Battalion, its original mission was providing air and coastal defense for advanced naval bases. Prior to World War II the battalion deployed to Iceland as part of the 1st Provisional Marine Brigade in order to defend the neutral country from possible German attack. Following the Iceland deployment and a period of rest and refitting at home the battalion again deployed overseas to provide air defense for Funafuti in the Ellice Islands from September 1942 through February 1944. Also in 1942, two batteries from the 5th were dispatched to support operations on Tulagi during the Guadalcanal Campaign. These two batteries were later reorganized as part of the newly formed 14th Defense Battalion. The 5th Defense Battalion was re-designated as the 5th Antiaircraft Artillery Battalion in April 1944 and took part in the Battle of Okinawa in 1945. After the war the battalion returned to the United States where it was decommissioned in November 1945. Because the 14th Defense Battalion was formed from batteries belonging to the 5th Defense Battalion the two units retained close ties throughout the war. The 14th was nicknamed "Five:Fourteenth" and after the war the battalions formed a single alumni association.

== History ==
=== Organization & deployment to Iceland ===
The 5th Defense Battalion was commissioned on 1 December 1940 at Marine Corps Recruit Depot Parris Island, South Carolina. From December 1940 until June 1941 the battalion organized itself and conducted training at MCRD Parris Island. In June 1941 the 5th Defense Battalion, alongside the 6th Marine Regiment, formed the nucleus of the 1st Provisional Marine Brigade that was sent to defend neutral Iceland against possible German attack. The force departed Charlestown, South Carolina on 27 June, stopped at Newfoundland en route and landed in Reykjavík on 7 July. There they relieved the British Army 49th (West Riding) Infantry Division of control of some areas of the country, while the British continued to administer the remainder. The battalion was emplaced around the harbor and airport in Reykjavík. During this deployment, the 5th Defense Battalion became the first Marine Corps unit to operationally employ radar when it utilized the newly acquired SCR-268s and SCR-270s.

Following the 7 December attack on Pearl Harbor, the men were informed they were redeploying from Iceland at the beginning of 1942 to likely see combat in the Pacific Theatre.Donovan 1992, p. 29 The 5th Defense Battalion was finally relieved of its duties on 5 March 1942 by the 61st Coast Artillery. It boarded the transport USAT Borinquen on 7 March and arrived in New York City on 25 March. Upon arrival in New York, the battalion boarded trains to return to MCRD Parris Island, SC. After a period of leave and additional training the battalion once again prepared for movement overseas.

=== South Pacific deployment and reorganization ===
On 5 July 1942 the battalion was moved to Naval Station Norfolk where it boarded the transports SS Mormacport and MS Bloemfontein. From there it sailed to Wellington, New Zealand arriving on 4 August 1942. The battalion disembarked and moved to McKay's Crossing Camp near Paekākāriki. The main body of the battalion departed Wellington on 25 August on board the USS Heywood (APA-6) and USS Libra (AKA-12). A 90 mm gun battery from the battalion was placed on board the USS Fuller (APA-7). After stops in Noumea, Tongatapu, and Espiritu Santo the 5th Defense Battalion's main body arrived at Funafuti on 2 October 1942. On 2 September the 90 mm gun battery arrived at Tulagi to assist in air defense operations near Guadalcanal. A second 155 mm artillery battery arrived on 2 November 1942.

The 5th Defense Battalion became the nucleus of the Defense Force, Funafuti until February 1944 when they were relieved by Detachment A of the 51st Defense Battalion. Defense Force, Funafuti engaged ten Japanese air raids during between March and November 1943. On 15 January 1943 the two batteries of the 5th Battalion located on Tulagi were re-designated as batteries of the newly formed 14th Defense Battalion. After being relieved at Funafuti the 5th Defense Battalion sailed for Kauai where it was reconstituted.

=== Another reorganization and Okinawa ===
As the war progressed, the Marine Corps removed coastal artillery from the defense battalions in order to form additional heavy artillery units for the Fleet Marine Force. Because of the divestiture of the coastal defense mission, the battalion was re-designated as the 5th Antiaircraft Artillery Battalion on 15 May 1944. For the next few months, the battalion continued to train on Kauai.

The 5th Antiaircraft Artillery Battalion landed on Okinawa from the USS Karnes (APA-175) between 3-5 May 1945. During the Battle of Okinawa the battalion was one of four AAA battalions that formed the 1st Provisional Antiaircraft Artillery Group. The 5th AAA Battalion was positioned to the southeast of Kadena Airfield in order to protect the airfield against Japanese air raids and kamikaze attacks. One Marine from the battalion was killed in action during the battle and another ten were wounded in action. The battalion was relieved of its air defense mission on Okinawa on 20 September 1945.

In October 1945 the battalion departed Okinawa and sailed for the United States. The battalion arrived at San Diego, California in November 1945. In November 1945 the 5th Antiaircraft Artillery Battalion was decommissioned at Marine Corps Base Camp Pendleton, California.

== Unit awards ==
A unit citation or commendation is an award bestowed upon an organization for the action cited. Members of the unit who participated in said actions are allowed to wear on their uniforms the awarded unit citation. The 5th Antiaircraft Artillery Battalion has been presented with the following awards:

Streamer	Award	Year(s)	Additional Info
	Presidential Unit Citation Streamer	17 April - 14 July 1945	Okinawa
	Asiatic-Pacific Campaign Streamer with one Bronze Star		Gilbert Islands, Okinawa
	World War II Victory Streamer	1941–1945	Pacific War

== See also ==
- Marine Defense Battalions
- List of United States Marine Corps aviation support units
