= SS Sea Carp =

SS Sea Carp may refer to one of two Type C3-S-A2 ships built for the United States Maritime Commission:

- SS Sea Carp (1943) (MC hull number 274), built by Western Pipe and Steel; acquired by the United States Navy and converted to Bayfield-class attack transport USS Clay (AP-84/APA-39); sold for commercial service in 1948; scrapped in 1974
- SS Sea Carp (1945) (MC hull number 881), built by Ingalls Shipbuilding; delivered in March 1945; sold 1947; scrapped in 1971
