= SS City of Los Angeles =

SS City of Los Angeles may refer to the following ships:

- SS City of Los Angeles (1918), laid down under this name but became USS Victorious (ID-3514) for the United States Navy in World War I; sailed as SS City of Havre from 1931 to 1938; sailed as SS City of Los Angeles (1938) until 1940; became USS George F. Elliot (AP-13) for the United States Navy in World War II; bombed and sunk at Florida Island in 1942
- SS City of Los Angeles (1922), sailed under this name from 1922 until scrapped in 1937; formerly USS Aeolus (ID-3005) for the United States Navy in World War I and SS Grosser Kurfürst for Norddeutscher Lloyd before that.
