= Alameda Works Shipyard =

Major American shipyard company

- Alameda County, California
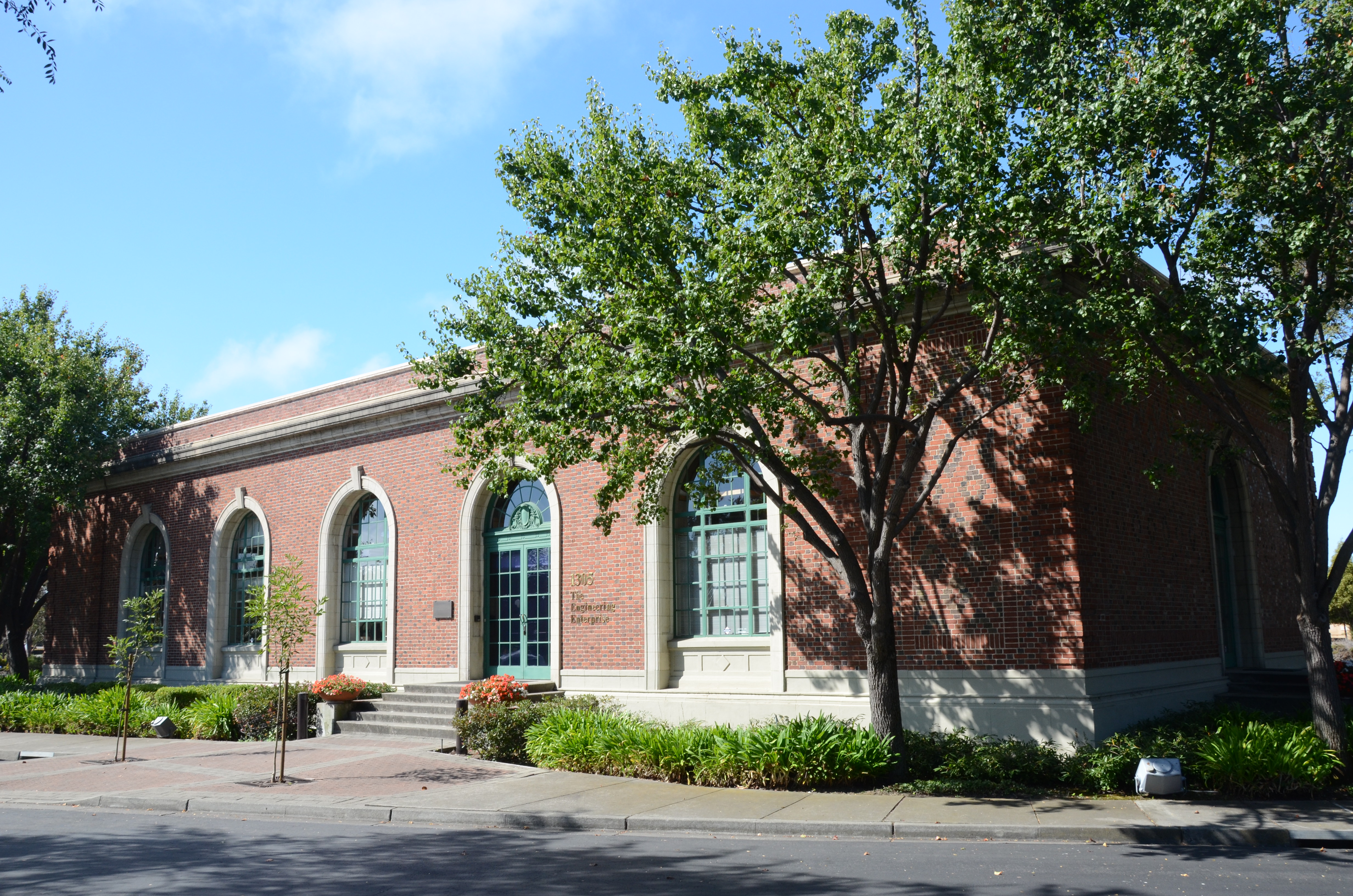
- Union Iron Works Powerhouse

Site information
- Type: Shipyard

Site history
- Built: 1900s
- In use: 1900s–1956
- Battles/wars
- Union Iron Works Powerhouse
- U.S. National Register of Historic Places
- Location within Oakland, California Location within California Location within the United States
- Location: Alameda, California
- Coordinates: 37°47′13″N 122°16′31″W
- NRHP reference No.: 80000793
- Added to NRHP: January 10, 1980

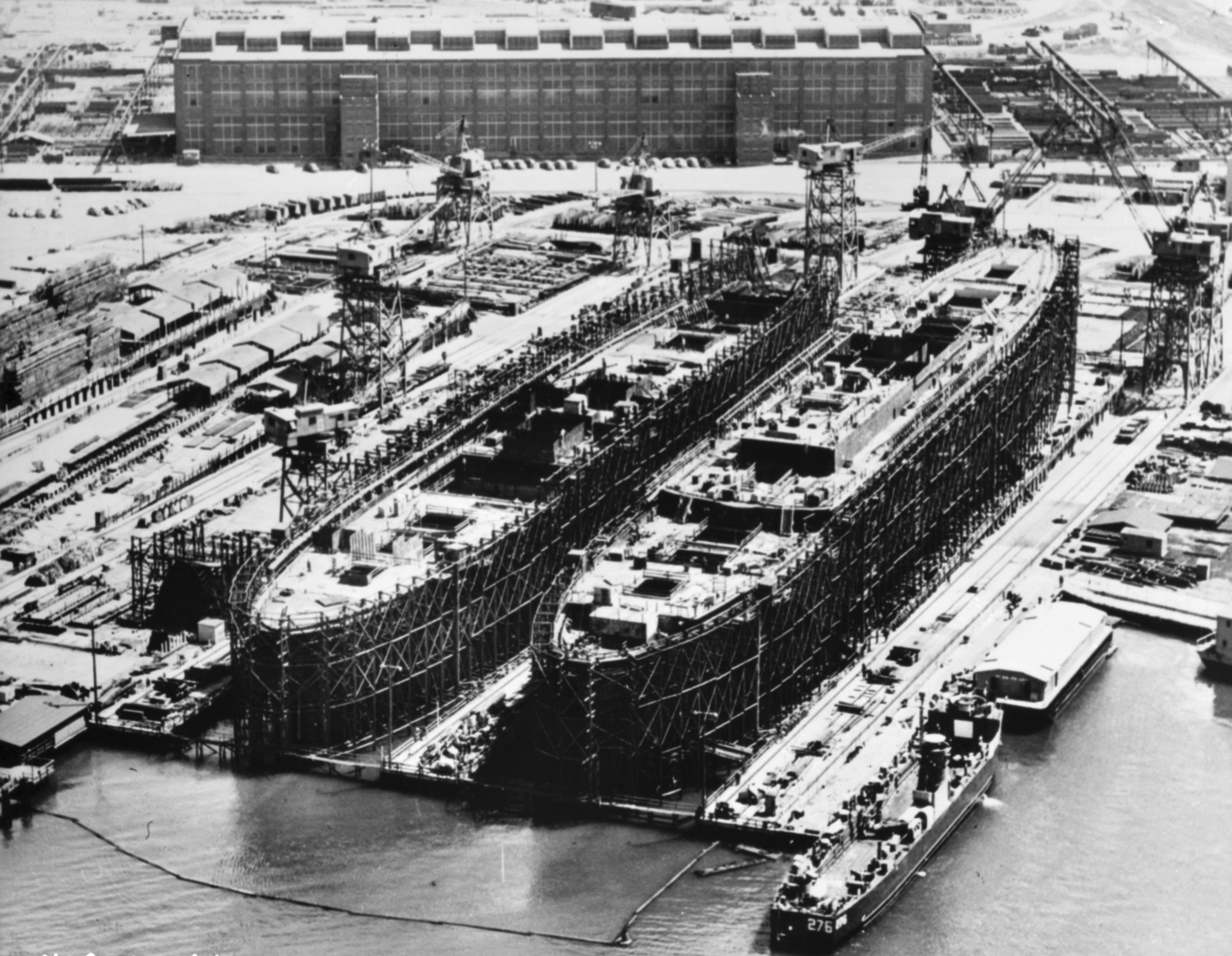
Union Iron Works Turbine Machine Shop and shipyard in Alameda

The Alameda Works Shipyard, in Alameda, California, United States, was one of the largest and best equipped shipyards in the country. The only building remaining from the yard is the Union Iron Works Powerhouse, which is listed on the National Register of Historic Places.1956.

== History ==
Established in the early 1900s by United Engineering Works, the yard was purchased by Union Iron Works (Bethlehem Shipbuilding Corporation) in 1916 and came to be known as the Alameda Works.

During the World War I period the yard built cargo ships, tankers and 2 small tugboats.

For the UK Admiralty

- War Knight, War Monarch, War Sword (1917, 7,700t cargo)
- War Harbor, War Haven, War Ocean, War Rock, War Sea (1918, 7,600t cargo)
- War Cape / Pan Massachusetts, War Surf, War Wave (1919, 7,600t cargo)

For other private contractors

- Talabot, Bessa (1917, 7,700t cargo)

For Atlantic Refining

- J. E. O'Neill, Herbert L. Pratt, W. M. Irish, W. M. Burton (1918, 7,100t tanker)

For Standard Oil of New Jersey

- W. S. Rheem (1918, 6,800t tanker)
- Franklin K. Lane, Crampton Anderson (1920 and 1921, 6,600t tanker)

For Standard Oil of California

- W. S. Miller (1920, 7,000t tanker)
- K. R. Kingsbury (1921, 8,800t tanker)
- F. H. Hillman, H. M. Storey, W. S. Rheem (1921-1922, 10,800t tanker)

For Socony-Vacuum Oil

- Algonquin, Yorba Linda (1919 and 1920, 7,000t tanker)

For Bethlehem's own Ore Steamship Company

- Chilore, Lebore (1923 and 1924, 8,300t ore carriers)

For the United States Shipping Board

- Volunteer (1220), Challenger (1222), Steadfast (1223) (1918, 7,700t cargo)
- 2 of 5 Design 1032 ships
  - Heffron (1574), Hegira (1575) (1919, 7,600t cargo)
- 17 tankers of 7,000t in 1919 and 1920
  - Richconcal (1460) ... Cathwood (1469)
  - Dungannon (1471) ... Halway (1475)
  - Hambro (1679), Hamer (1680)

tugs Dreadnaught, Undaunted

Challenger, Independence (War Harbor), Victorious (War Haven) and Defiance (War Ocean) were all launched on 4 July 1918.

The Lebore was the last ship delivered (January 1924) during that production period.

The site was expanded from 7 acres (2.8 ha) to 75 acres (30 ha) with facilities for constructing up to six major vessels simultaneously. After 1923, the Alameda Works ceased making ships but continued its dry docking and ship repair operations.

At the beginning of World War II, the Alameda Works was re-established as the Bethlehem Alameda Shipyard, and modernized and expanded to include new shipways and on-site worker housing. During the war produced P-2 Admiral-type troop ships, as well as some repair work and it continued to produce structural steel.

== Union Iron Works Powerhouse ==
This power station was designed by San Francisco architect Frederick Meyer, one of many designed for the Pacific Gas and Electric Company in Northern California between 1905 and the 1920s. It is a one-story rectangular industrial building, 25 feet (7.6 m) high, 53 feet (16 m) wide and 110 feet (34 m) long, that rests on a concrete base. Designed in a simplified Renaissance Revival style, the powerhouse is an excellent example of a building type-the "beautiful" power house-for which the San Francisco Bay Area was nationally known. It contained several large generators and was constructed specifically to meet the massive electricity requirements of the yards.1956.

Today, the little building that once powered an entire shipyard has been converted into private office space and is closed to the public.

== See also ==
- Moore Dry Dock Company#Shipbuilding in Oakland and Alameda
- Naval Air Station Alameda — nearby airfield
- Union Iron Works — the other San Francisco Bethlehem yard across the bay
- Federal Shipbuilding and Drydock Company of New Jersey, built the remaining P2 transports
- Two-Ocean Navy Act — Alameda Works cargo ships were apparently preferred to be acquired for conversion to Attack transports in the early stages of the industrial mobilization. The 5 ships of the Heywood class were built in Alameda.
