= McCawley-class attack transport =

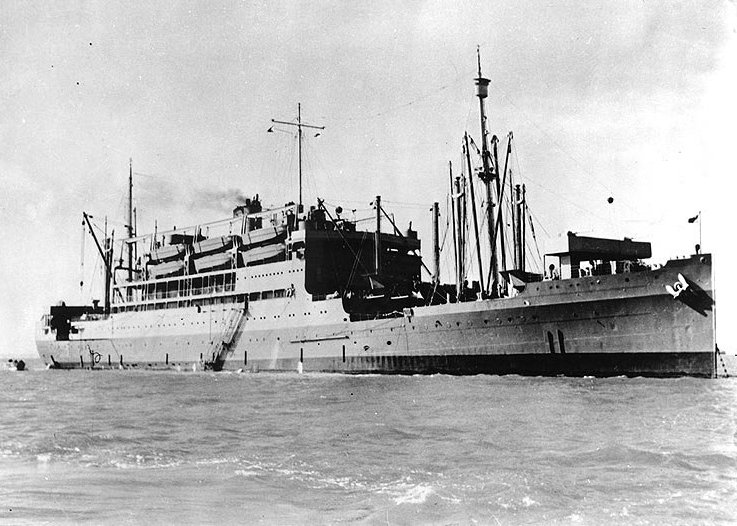
- USS McCawley, lead ship of the McCawley class (seen here when still designated AP-10 in 1941/42)

Class overview
- Name: McCawley class
- Builders: Furness Shipbuilding Company, England
- Operators: United States Navy
- Preceded by: Harris class
- Succeeded by: Heywood class
- Built: 1928
- In service: Commercial: 1928-1940
- In commission: Navy: 1940-1946
- Completed: 2
- Lost: 1
- Retired: 1

General characteristics
- Class & type: McCawley-class attack transport
- Displacement: 9,600 tons (fl)
- Length: 486 ft 6 in (148.29 m)
- Beam: ~63 ft 6 in (19.35 m)
- Draft: ~25 ft 6 in (7.77 m)
- Propulsion: 2 x 8-cylinder 2-cycle Sulzer diesel engines, 2 x propellers, designed shaft horsepower 8,000
- Speed: 15-17 knots
- Capacity: Troops: 88-89 officers, 1,207 enlisted; Cargo: 164,561 cu ft (4,659.8 m^{3})
- Complement: 41 officers, 437 enlisted
- Armament: McCawley: 4 x 3"/50 caliber dual-purpose guns, 2 x twin 40mm guns, 18 x single 20mm guns.

The McCawley-class attack transport was a class of US Navy attack transport built in 1928 that saw service in World War II.

Like all attack transports, the purpose of the McCawley-class ships was to transport troops and their equipment to hostile shores in order to execute amphibious invasions. Attack transports carried a substantial number of integral landing craft for making the assault, and were well armed with antiaircraft weaponry to protect themselves and their vulnerable cargo of troops from air attack in the battle zone.

== Background ==
The McCawley class is amongst the few classes of attack transport that were converted from pre-war tonnage rather than being built during the war from either Maritime Commission or Victory ship hull types. The two ships of this class also hold the distinction of being the only attack transports not to be built in the United States.

The origin of the two ships which were to become the McCawley class goes back to a United States government decision in the 1920s that allowed foreign-built ships to retain eligibility for US mail contracts. Accordingly, the American shipping company Grace Lines ordered two cargo liners from the Furness Shipbuilding Company of Haverton Hill-on-Tees in Northern England, which were completed in 1928 as Santa Barbara and Santa Maria. These ships were the first large diesel-powered passenger ships to sail under the American flag.

The two Grace Lines ships continued to operate between the United States and South America, and later on US coastal mail runs, until being bought by the US Navy for conversion to troop transports in late 1940. The conversions were duly carried out, and Santa Barbara and Santa Maria became USS McCawley (AP-10) and USS Barnett (AP-11) respectively. They were reclassified as attack transports APA-4 and APA-5 on 1 February 1943.

== Description ==
The McCawleys were each powered by two eight-cylinder, two-cycle, 4,000 horsepower (3,000 kW) diesel engines yielding a total horsepower of 8000 and a top speed of around 16 knots (30 km/h). In commercial service they carried 150 passengers and had a gross tonnage of 8000. After conversion to attack transports, they had a troop capacity of about 1,300 and a cargo capacity of about 165,000 cubic feet (4,700 m^{3}).

They were each armed with four 3"/50 caliber dual-purpose guns and a variable assortment of secondary armament.

== In service ==
Both ships saw their first action in the long and bitterly fought Guadalcanal campaign in the Pacific Theatre. Sadly, this would prove to be McCawley's one and only campaign. After participating in the initial landings in August 1942 as the command ship of Admiral Richmond K. Turner, and continuing in support missions to the island for the next nine months, she was mistaken for an enemy vessel by US Navy PT boats on the night of 30 June 1943 and sunk by torpedoes.

Her sister ship, Barnett, survived the Guadalcanal campaign and went on to take part in most of the major amphibious operations in the European Theatre, including the invasions of Sicily, Italy, Normandy and Southern France, before returning to the Pacific to participate in the invasion of Okinawa in 1945. Barnett was decommissioned along with most other attack transports in early 1946, and sold into commercial service not long thereafter.
