= Design 1032 ship =

US tanker ship design in World War I

Class overview
- Name: EFT Design 1032
- Builders: Alameda Works Shipyard
- Built: 1919–1920
- Planned: 5
- Completed: 5

General characteristics
- Tonnage: 11,800 dwt
- Length: 440 ft 0 in (134.11 m)
- Beam: 56 ft 0 in (17.07 m)
- Draft: 35 ft 2 in (10.72 m)
- Propulsion: Triple expansion engine, oil fuel

The Design 1032 ship (full name Emergency Fleet Corporation Design 1032) was a steel-hulled tanker ship design approved for production by the United States Shipping Board's Emergency Fleet Corporation (EFT) in World War I. A total of 5 ships were ordered and completed from 1919 to 1920. All ships were constructed by Bethlehem San Francisco, but sources disagree whether all were built in Alameda or some were also built in the Union Iron Works yard.

== Bibliography ==
- McKellar, Norman L. "Steel Shipbuilding under the U. S. Shipping Board, 1917-1921, Part III, Contract Steel Ships" (PDF). Steel Shipbuilding under the U. S. Shipping Board, 1917-1921. ShipScribe.
