= USS Karnes =

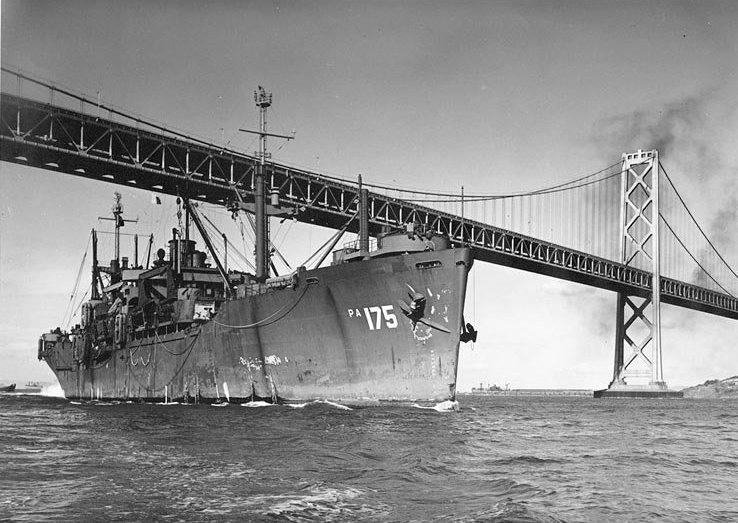
- USS Karnes (APA-175) passing under the San Francisco-Oakland Bay Bridge, late 1945 or early '46

History

United States
- Name: USS Karnes
- Namesake: Karnes County, Texas
- Ordered: as type VC2-S-AP5
- Launched: 7 November 1944
- Acquired: 3 December 1944
- Commissioned: 3 December 1944
- Decommissioned: 11 April 1946
- Stricken: 1946
- Fate: Scrapped, 1974

General characteristics
- Displacement: 12,450 tons (full load)
- Length: 455 ft 0 in (138.68 m)
- Beam: 62 ft 0 in (18.90 m)
- Draught: 24 ft 0 in (7.32 m)
- Speed: 19 knots
- Capacity: 150,000 cu. ft, 2,900 tons
- Complement: 56 Officers 480 Enlisted
- Armament: one 5 in (130 mm) gun mount, twelve 40 mm gun mounts, one 20 mm gun mount

USS Karnes (APA-175) was a Haskell-class attack transport acquired by the U.S. Navy during World War II for the task of transporting troops to and from combat areas.

== World War II service ==
Karnes (APA-175) was launched 7 November 1944 by Oregon Shipbuilding Corp., Portland, Oregon, for the United States Maritime Commission; sponsored by Miss Nora Clancy; acquired and commissioned by the Navy 3 December 1944.

=== Landing troops on Saipan and embarking the wounded ===
After shakedown along the California coast Karnes arrived Pearl Harbor 13 February 1945 with passengers and cargo from the U.S. West Coast. Six days later she sailed in convoy to land troops at Saipan and other staging areas in the Pacific Ocean. At Saipan she embarked 406 U.S. Marines wounded in the Iwo Jima campaign and returned Pearl Harbor 17 March.

=== Reinforcing Okinawa with troops and supplies ===
With the Okinawa invasion well underway, Karnes departed Pearl Harbor 7 April with troops and supplies to reinforce Americans fighting on that bitterly contested island. She arrived Okinawa 3 May and unloaded troops and equipment while under heavy kamikaze attack. She departed the battle zone 8 May with 866 survivors of ships damaged by kamikazes. Karnes discharged some survivors at Saipan and arrived San Francisco, California, 27 May with the remaining group.

She returned to the embattled Pacific islands, arriving Manila 1 July with troop replacements and cargo. Following this mission, the transport returned Pearl Harbor 23 July to begin training for the anticipated invasion of the Japanese home islands and maneuvers.

=== End-of-war "mopping-up" operations ===
Upon the cessation of hostilities 14 August Karnes began preparing for the occupation of Japan, arriving at Sasebo 22 September. She was then assigned to Operation Magic Carpet duty returning men eligible for discharge, and arrived San Francisco 11 November with her first group of veterans. Karnes ended a second "Magic Carpet" cruise 12 January 1946, returning American fighting men from China.

== Post-war decommissioning ==
On 13 February she departed San Francisco and arrived Norfolk, Virginia, 2 March where she decommissioned 11 April 1946 and was struck from the Navy list. Karnes was returned to the War Shipping Administration (WSA) 24 April 1946. She entered the National Defense Reserve Fleet and was berthed in James River, Virginia. In 1974 Karnes was sold for scrapping.

== Military awards and honors ==
Karnes received one battle star for World War II service at Okinawa.
