= 14th Antiaircraft Artillery Battalion =

United States Marine Corps WWII antiaircraft unit

- Active: 15 Jan 1943 – 30 Jun 1945
- Country: United States of America
- Branch: United States Marine Corps
- Type: Air Defense/Coastal Defense
- Size: ~1100 men
- Nickname(s): Five:Fourteenh
- Engagements: World War II: Guadalcanal Campaign; Battle of Guam

Commanders
- Current commander: N/A

The 14th Antiaircraft Artillery Battalion (14th AAA Bn) was an anti-aircraft unit in the United States Marine Corps that served during World War II. The battalion was originally formed in 1943 as the 14th Defense Battalion. Its mission was to provide air and coastal defense for advanced naval bases. During the war the battalion took part in combat operations in the Solomon Islands and on Guam. The battalion was decommissioned on June 30, 1945. Since then no other unit has carried the lineage and honors of the 14th Antiaircraft Artillery Battalion.

== History ==
=== Organization ===
14th Defense Battalion Table of Organization (1943):

- Headquarters and Service Battery
  - Light tank platoon
  - Searchlight Batteries
- Seacoast Artillery Group
  - Group Headquarters
  - 2 x 155mm Gun Batteries
- AAA Group
  - Group Headquarters
  - 3 x 90mm Gun batteries
- Special Weapons Group
  - Group Headquarters
  - 40mm Battery (w/ 12 guns)
  - 20mm Anti-aircraft Gun Battery
  - .50cal Anti-aircraft Machine Gun Battery

The 14th Defense Battalion was commissioned on January 15, 1943 in the field on Tulagi in the Solomon Islands. Personnel for the battalion were sourced from two batteries from the 5th Defense Battalion and a 5"/51 caliber gun 5-inch battery from the 9th Defense Battalion that were remaining behind on Guadalcanal and Tulagi. Because a majority of the battalion's original personnel were from the 5th Defense Battalion the 14th took on the nickname "Five:Fourteenth."

=== Nouméa & the Bismarck Archipelago ===
The battalion remained in the Solomons until September 1943 when its headquarters was relieved by United States Army units and departed for Noumea, New Caledonia on September 16, 1943. Arriving four days later it disembarked and established its command post near TonTouta. The rest of the battalion was relieved within the next month and the entire battalion was present on Nouméa by October 22 responsible for air and coastal defense of the area.

On March 7, 1944, most of the battalion loaded gear onto seven different ships and departed Nouméa. The convoy arrived on Guadalcanal on March 12. Prior to departing the island, a composite anti-aircraft battery from the 14th was assembled as part of a small Marine task force to support the United States Army during its assault on the St Matthias Islands. The battery landed on the southeast corner of Emirau in support of the 4th Marine Regiment. There was no opposition on the island and the Seabees set out building an airfield immediately. Another detachment from the battalion supported the 1st Marine Aircraft Wing's occupation of Green Island. Seizure of both of these islands within the Bismarck Archipelago were critical in the effort to bypass the main Japanese airfield at Rabaul.

=== Guam ===
In May 1944 the Marine Corps organized a unit of 51 Marines called the 1st Provisional Smoke Screen Unit. Its mission was to utilize smoke generators during enemy bombing raids with the purpose of obscuring friendly targets. This unit was attached to the 14th to be tested during its next operation. During the first week of June 1944 the battalion was divided into three echelons to be part of the Southern Attack Force for the upcoming assault to recapture Guam. The first two echelons departed Guadalcanal in a different convoy however they eventually linked up at Eniwetok on June 28. The third echelon remained until mid-July when they also embarked upon naval shipping. The first two echelons departed Eniwetok on July 17.

On the morning of July 21, 1944 an advanced party from the 14th Defense Battalion went ashore on Guam from the USS President Monroe (AP-104). The rest of the battalion came ashore a few hours after the initial assault waves stormed the beach. By night of the first day all of the battalion's anti-aircraft batteries were emplaced ashore with some also providing direct fire support for Marines of the 3rd Marine Regiment. On July 23, the battalion received orders to occupy Cabras Island in Apra Harbor. From Cabras Island the battalion was able to continue its mission of providing air defense for Orote Field and provide flanking artillery fire for Marines on the Orote Peninsula and in the Northern part of the island. The battalion's command post moved from Cabras to the Orote Peninsula on August 5. The smokescreen unit that had been attached to the battalion prior to the battle was disbanded in July 1944 because the concept did not prove feasible. During the battle the battalion served under the command of the 12th Marine Regiment.

As the war progressed, the Marine Corps removed coastal artillery from the defense battalions in order to form additional heavy artillery units for the Fleet Marine Force. Because of the divestiture of the coastal defense mission, the battalion was re-designated as the 14th Antiaircraft Artillery Battalion on September 1, 1944. The battalion spent the remainder of their time as part of the garrison force on Guam and was decommissioned there on June 30, 1945 before the end of the war.

== Commanding Officers ==
The following officers served as Commanding Officers of the battalion:

- Col Galen M. Sturgis (15 Jan 1943 - June 1943)
- LtCol Jessie L Perkins (June 1943 - March 1944)
- LtCol William F. Parks (March 1944 - 30 June 1945)

== Unit awards ==
A unit citation or commendation is an award bestowed upon an organization for the action cited. Members of the unit who participated in said actions are allowed to wear on their uniforms the awarded unit citation. The 14th Antiaircraft Artillery Battalion has been presented with the following awards:

Streamer	Award	Year(s)	Additional Info
	Asiatic-Pacific Campaign Streamer	1943, 1944	Solomon Islands, Guam
	World War II Victory Streamer	1941–1945	Pacific War

== See also ==
- Marine Defense Battalions
- List of United States Marine Corps aviation support units
