= USS Fuller (APA-7) =

Heywood-class attack transport

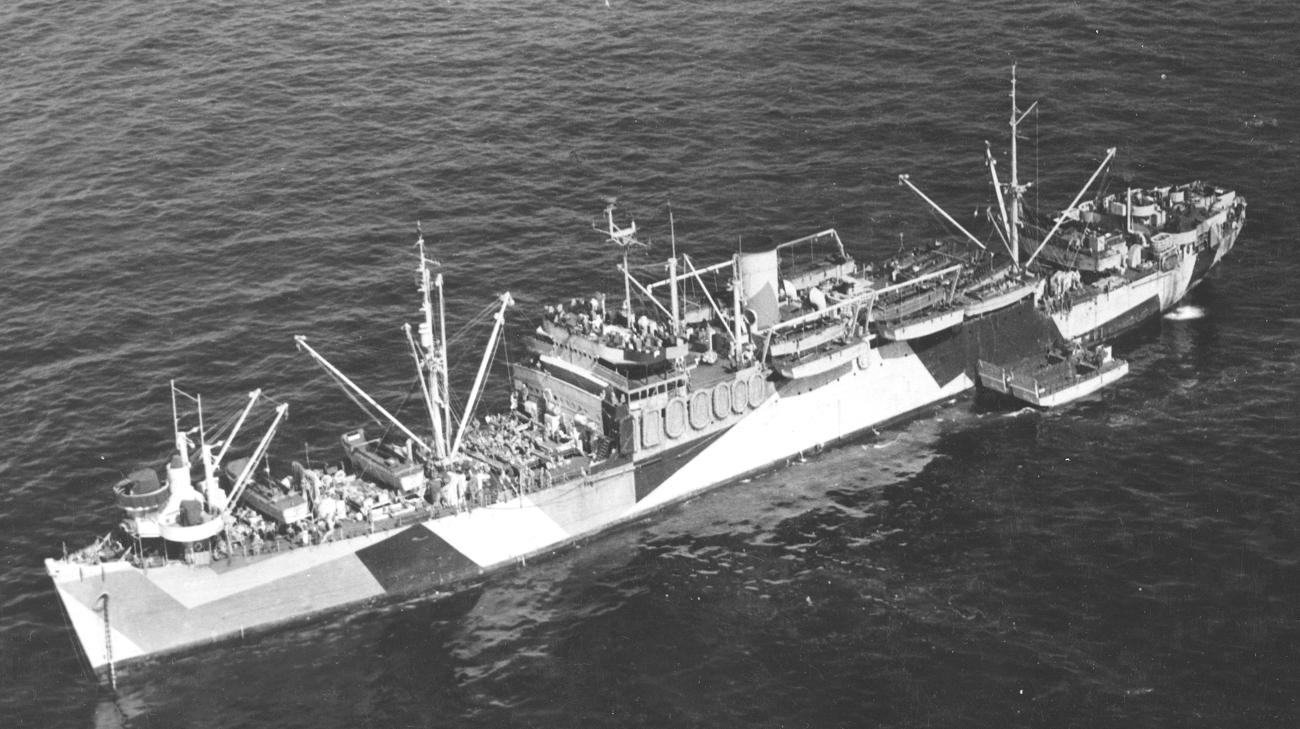
- USS Fuller (APA-7) at anchor, 1944

History

United States
- Laid down: 1918 as War Wave
- Launched: 4 November 1918 as Archer
- Acquired: 12 November 1940
- Commissioned: 9 April 1941
- Decommissioned: 20 March 1946
- Stricken: not known
- Fate: Scrapped, 1957

General characteristics
- Displacement: 8,000 t.(lt) 14,450 t.(fl)
- Length: 507 ft (155 m)
- Beam: 56 ft (17 m)
- Draft: 29 ft 9 in (9.07 m)
- Propulsion: Four Babcock & Wilcox header-type boilers; one De Laval steam turbine, geared turbine drive; single propeller; designated shaft horsepower 9,500
- Speed: 16 knots (30 km/h)
- Capacity: 150,000 cu. ft., 2,900 t.
- Complement: 43, Enlisted 337
- Armament: one single 5 in (130 mm) dual-purpose gun mount; four single 3 in (76 mm) dual-purpose gun mounts; eight 0.5 in (12.7 mm) machine guns; 2 twin 40 mm AA gun mounts

USS Fuller (AP-14/APA-7) was a Heywood-class attack transport in service with the United States Navy from 1941 to 1946. She was scrapped in 1957.

== History ==
The second Navy ship to be named Fuller was laid down in 1918 as War Wave at the Bethlehem Shipbuilding Corporation Alameda Works Shipyard yard as hull # 169 for the British Shipping Controller, London, requisitioned during construction and completed 1919 by the United States Shipping Board (USSB) as Archer assigned official number 217596. Renamed City of Newport News on acquisition by the Baltimore Mail S.S. Co. in 1930. Transferred to the Navy 12 November 1940; and commissioned in ordinary for conversion the same day; and commissioned in full 9 April 1941. She was reclassified from AP-14 to APA-7 on 1 February 1943. The conversion added 100 feet (30 m) in length to allow more cargo and marines to be carried.

=== Pre–World War II North Atlantic operations ===
After training her crew in the operation of landing craft, Fuller arrived at Charleston, South Carolina, for duty in the Atlantic Fleet 15 June 1941. She sailed from Charleston 22 June in the convoy carrying the first marine troops to the occupation of Iceland, from which she returned to Norfolk, Virginia, 22 July. Training operations with marines on the North Carolina coast, and with her division in the Norfolk area, continued until her departure from Hampton Roads 5 December 1941 to transport marines to Cuba, the Canal Zone, and Puerto Rico. She returned north for exercises with soldiers in Lynnhaven Roads, then between 19 February 1942 and 25 March, carried troops and cargo to Northern Ireland.

=== Pacific War ===
Fuller sailed from Norfolk 10 April 1942 for Wellington, New Zealand, arriving 22 May.

==== Solomon Islands Campaign ====
She landed U.S. Marines and their equipment in the initial assault on Guadalcanal 7 August, and through the next months continued to sail out of Wellington to bring reinforcements and supplies to Guadalcanal and South Pacific bases, often coming under Japanese air attack. As U.S. Army troops relieved the battle-weary marines on Guadalcanal, Fuller carried soldiers from Noumea and Suva to Guadalcanal. In May 1943 she sailed to Pearl Harbor to load marines for transportation to Australia, then returned to her transport duties from New Zealand and Australia to South Pacific bases.

On 28 October 1943, Fuller sailed from Efate, New Hebrides, for the initial landings on Bougainville, where she landed Marine raiders on Cape Torokina 1 November. Laden with casualties, she cleared the assault beaches the same day for Tulagi and Purvis Bay. Returning to Bougainville's Empress Augusta Bay anchorage with reinforcements 8 November, Fuller came under enemy air attack, receiving a direct hit on her port side which set her afire and killed five of her crew and two soldiers embarked. She returned to Purvis Bay 2 days later to repair battle damage, and twice more during the following month and a half carried reinforcements to Bougainville.

==== Marianas and Peleliu ====
After a U.S. West Coast overhaul between 18 January 1944 and 20 March, Fuller trained at San Diego, California, and in the Hawaiian Islands for the Marianas assault. She sailed from Pearl Harbor 29 May for Saipan, where on the morning of 15 June she staged in a feint landing before putting her troops ashore in the actual assault. Ordered away from the island for safety during the Battle of the Philippine Sea, Fuller completed unloading her cargo 24 June, and sailed for Eniwetok with prisoners of war on board.

For the invasion of Tinian, 24 July 1944, Fuller again staged a diversionary feint at landings, then landed her marines next day as reinforcements. She returned to Espiritu Santo 9 August with casualties, then loaded troops and cargo in the Russells for landing exercises on Guadalcanal. Fuller carried the same men to the assault on Peleliu on 15 September, and after offloading all her cargo and receiving casualties, sailed for Hollandia, arriving 25 September for drills in anticipation of the Leyte assault. She landed troops successfully in San Pedro Bay, Leyte, in the initial assault of 20 October, then sailed at once for Humboldt Bay to load reinforcements and supplies, with which she returned to San Pedro Bay 14 November.

==== Philippine Island ====
After preparations at Manus and New Guinea, Fuller once again launched her landing craft for the assault in Lingayen Gulf, Luzon, 9 January 1945, putting out the next day for Leyte to load reinforcements. These she landed at Lingayen, then sailed back to Leyte and on to Ulithi to load marines for exercises at Guadalcanal. Returning to Ulithi 21 March, Fuller sailed 6 days later for the invasion of Okinawa, off which she arrived during the initial landings of 1 April. However, she did not land her men until the 7th, and 2 days later she sailed for the west coast, and an overhaul completed in July. Arriving at San Pedro Bay, Leyte, 2 days after hostilities ceased, Fuller carried out occupation transport assignments until returning to Seattle, Washington, 3 December 1945.

=== Decommissioning and fate ===
There she was decommissioned 20 March 1946, and transferred to the Maritime Commission 1 July 1946. She was sold for scrapping, 22 April 1957, to Dulien Steel Products Co., Seattle, Washington (USA).

== Military awards and honors ==
Fuller received nine battle stars for World War II service:

- Guadalcanal-Tulagi landings - 7 August 1943
- Capture and defense of Guadalcanal – August 1942 to February 1943
- Treasury-Bougainville operation - Occupation and defense of Cape Torokina, 1 November to 8 November 1943
- Marianas operation - Capture and occupation of Saipan, 15 June to 24 June 1944
- Tinian capture and occupation - 24 July to 25 July 1944
- Western Caroline Islands operation - Capture and occupation of southern Palau Islands, 15 September 1944
- Leyte operation - Leyte landings, San Pedro Bay, 20 October and 14 November 1944
- Luzon operation - Lingayen Gulf landings, 9 January 1945
- Okinawa Gunto operation - Assault and occupation of Okinawa Gunto, 1 April to 9 April 1945

== Bibliography ==
- Wright, Christopher C. (1998). "Question 17/97: Screen of Convoys that Includes USS McCawley, April–May 1942". Warship International. XXXV (3). International Naval Research Organization: 307–313. ISSN 0043-0374.
- The Lady Gangster, A Sailor's Memoir by Del Staecker 2009

Sailor Man The Troubled Life and Times of J.P. Nunnally, USN by Del Staecker 2015 ISBN 9781555718169
