= USS Defiance (ID-3327) =

Cargo ship of the United States Navy

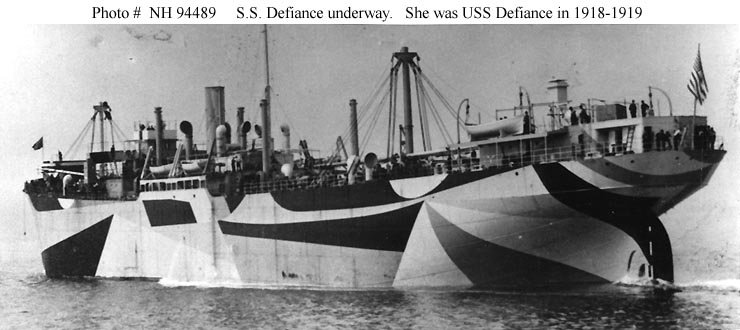
- S.S. Defiance (American Freighter, 1918) Underway, probably while running trials in San Francisco Bay, California, circa early September 1918. This ship served as USS Defiance (ID # 3327) in 1918-1919. Note his pattern camouflage.

History

United States
- Name: USS Defiance
- Builder: Union Iron Works
- Launched: 4 July 1918
- Acquired: 5 September 1918
- Commissioned: 5 September 1918
- Decommissioned: 1 March 1919
- Fate: Scrapped in 1960 at La Spezia, Italy.

General characteristics
- Tonnage: 16,400
- Length: 440 ft 1 in (134.14 m)
- Beam: 56 ft (17 m)
- Draft: 29 ft 9 in (9.07 m)
- Speed: 10 kts
- Complement: 68

The first USS Defiance (ID-3327) was a cargo ship in the United States Navy during World War I.

Defiance was built in 1918 by Union Iron Works of Bethlehem Shipbuilding Company, Alameda, California. She was acquired by the Navy 5 September 1918; and commissioned the same day.

Defiance sailed from San Francisco 14 September 1918 with a cargo of flour and naval stores, and arrived at New York 11 October to exchange her cargo for Army supplies. Ten days later she was underway for Norfolk, Virginia to join a convoy bound for Southampton, England, and Dunkirk, France, where she delivered her cargo to the Army of Occupation. She returned to Immingham and Dublin, Ireland, to load material being returned to the States. She departed 27 January 1919 for Hampton Roads, and arrived 16 February.

Defiance was decommissioned 1 March 1919 and delivered to the Shipping Board the same day for disposal.
