= USS Clay =

1943 Bayfield-class attack transport

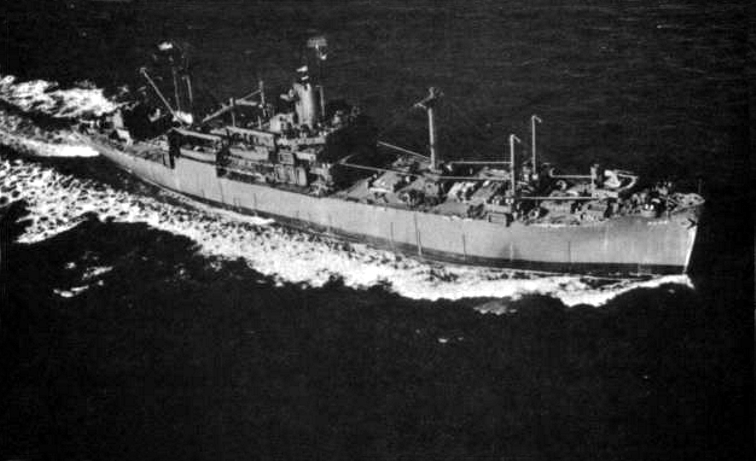

History

United States
- Name: USS Clay
- Namesake: Clay County, Alabama; Clay County, Arkansas; Clay County, Florida; Clay County, Georgia; Clay County, Illinois; Clay County, Indiana; Clay County, Iowa; Clay County, Kansas; Clay County, Kentucky; Clay County, Minnesota; Clay County, Mississippi; Clay County, Missouri; Clay County, Nebraska; Clay County, North Carolina; Clay County, South Dakota; Clay County, Tennessee; Clay County, Texas; Clay County, West Virginia
- Builder: Western Pipe & Steel
- Laid down: 14 October 1942
- Launched: 23 January 1943
- Christened: Sea Angel
- Commissioned: 15 March 1943
- Decommissioned: 29 April 1946
- Renamed: USS Clay, President Johnson, La Salle.
- Stricken: 19 July 1946
- Honours and awards: Four battle stars for service in World War II.
- Fate: Scrapped 1974
- Notes: Delivered 29 June 1943

General characteristics
- Class & type: Bayfield class attack transport
- Displacement: 11,760 tons
- Length: 492 ft (150 m)
- Beam: 69 ft 6 in (21.18 m)
- Draught: 26 ft 6 in (8.08 m)
- Propulsion: General Electric geared turbine, two Combustion Engineering D-type boilers, single propeller, Design shaft horsepower 8,500
- Speed: 18.4 knots
- Complement: 51 officers, 524 enlisted. Troop capacity 80 officers, 1,146 enlisted
- Armament: 2 × single 5 inch/38 dual purpose mounts, one fore and one aft.; 2 × quad 1.1"/75 caliber gun mounts, aft port and starboard, replaced by two single 40 mm AA gun mounts.; 2 × twin 40 mm AA gun mounts forward, port and starboard.; 18 × single 20 mm gun AA gun mounts.

USS Clay (APA-39) was a Bayfield class attack transport in service with the United States Navy from 1943 to 1946. She was then sold into commercial service and was scrapped in 1974.

== History ==
USS Clay was originally laid down as Sea Angel by the Western Pipe and Steel Company on 14 October 1942. The vessel was launched on 23 January 1943 and commissioned into the US Navy as naval transport USS Clay (AP-84) on 29 June 1943. The ship then sailed from San Pedro to New York, where she was decommissioned for conversion on 11 August 1943, and recommissioned into service as an attack transport designated APA-39 on 21 December 1943, after which she sailed to Pearl Harbor in preparation for operations against the Japanese.

=== Saipan ===
After an abortive operation against Kavieng (cancelled due to neutralization of the Japanese forces there by other means), USS Clay headed to Saipan, where on the morning of 15 June 1944 she participated in a feint landing off the island's northwestern coast in order to draw Japanese troops away from the real landing zone. On the afternoon of the same day, Clay participated in the invasion proper, landing elements of the 2nd Marine Division.

Clay then returned to Pearl Harbor with troops and Japanese prisoners of war, arriving on 9 July. Clay's naval division was then ordered to San Diego to embark the 5th Marine Division for an attack on Guam, but during the trip Guam fell to US forces and the ship was diverted to Hawaii in preparation for a new operation.

=== Leyte ===
After intensive rehearsals, USS Clay then embarked with elements of the 96th Infantry Division for an attack on Yap, but once again the course of the war made the invasion unnecessary and the ship was ordered to participate in an invasion of Leyte instead, 700 miles beyond. The vessel staged at Manus and on 14 October set sail as part of a large invasion force, taking part in the invasion on 20 October. Under constant threat from Japanese aircraft, Clay then sailed from Leyte to Hollandia and thence Morotai, before returning to Leyte with vital reinforcements and supplies. The vessel unloaded in a single day and on 14 November proceeded once again to Manus, then to Cape Gloucester, where following her arrival on 27 November, she began to prepare for the invasion of Luzon in Lingayen Gulf.

=== Luzon ===
On 31 December 1944, USS Clay departed for the invasion of Luzon. In the face of kamikaze air attacks, the invasion was successfully carried out on 9 January. Clay herself helped beat off the suicide attacks, and the Japanese erroneously reported her sinking.

Clay then returned to Leyte to embark elements of the 1st Cavalry Division, which she also transported to Luzon, arriving on 27 January. After taking on board wounded soldiers, Clay then set sail for Guadalcanal to embark elements of the 6th Marines.

=== Okinawa ===
After more rehearsals, USS Clay embarked in March with elements of the 6th Marines as part of the massive invasion fleet destined for Okinawa. Braving attacking planes and gunfire, the invasion took place on 1 April. By 5 April Clay was returning home to San Francisco for an overhaul and an increase in her armament in preparation for the invasion of Japan. While in port she also received a new commanding officer, Captain E. M. Eller, and refresher training at San Diego.

=== After the Japanese surrender ===
On 27 July USS Clay headed once more for the Pacific, but before she could arrive the US unleashed its atomic bombs on Nagasaki and Hiroshima and the Japanese surrendered. Clay continued to Leyte, and from there to Cebu where she embarked elements of 182nd Infantry Regiment for occupation duties in Japan. On 1 September, she sailed for Tokyo Bay as flagship of Temporary Squadron 13 (part of Tokyo Force), skippered by Squadron Commander Captain R C Bartham.

Sailing through swept minefields and past the wreck of the Japanese battleship Nagato, USS Clay disembarked her cargo in the devastated industrial region between Yokohama and Tokyo, before returning to Cebu and thence to Otaru with more occupation troops. She then journeyed to Guam to pick up occupation troops for Tientsin, China. From there she sailed to Saipan to embark troops returning home to the United States, arriving at San Pedro on 5 December 1945. After a second trip to the Pacific to pick up more returning servicemen, she sailed from San Francisco on 9 March 1946 and arrived at New York on 27 March. She was decommissioned on 15 May 1946 .

In the course of her naval career, USS Clay covered over 100,000 miles in wartime operations. She received four battle stars for her wartime service.

=== Commercial service ===
After decommissiong, the vessel was sold through the Maritime Commission on 12 September 1946 to American President Lines, which renamed her SS President Johnson. By the 1970s she had been sold again, to Waterman Steamship Corporation, and renamed SS La Salle. The vessel was finally scrapped in 1974.
