= Attack transport =

United States Navy ship classification

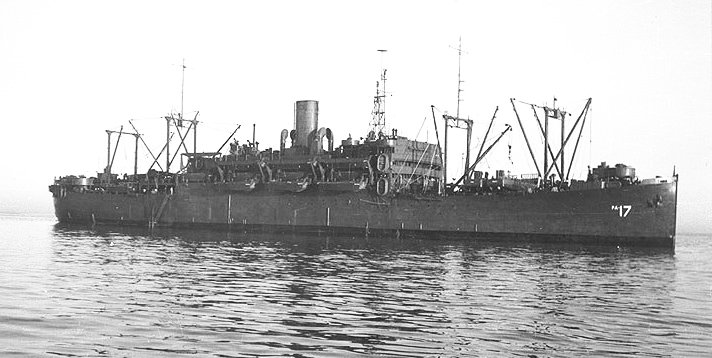
USS American Legion was a Harris-class attack transport launched in 1919 that saw extensive service in World War II

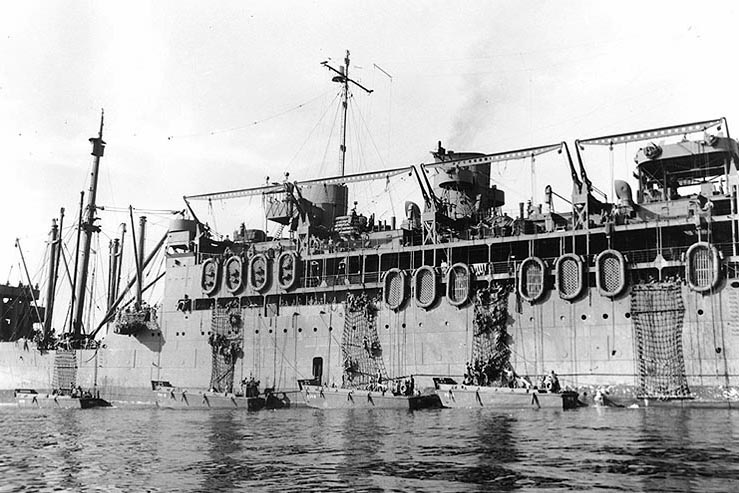
Soldiers climb down netting on the sides of the attack transport USS McCawley on 14 June 1943, rehearsing for landings on New Georgia

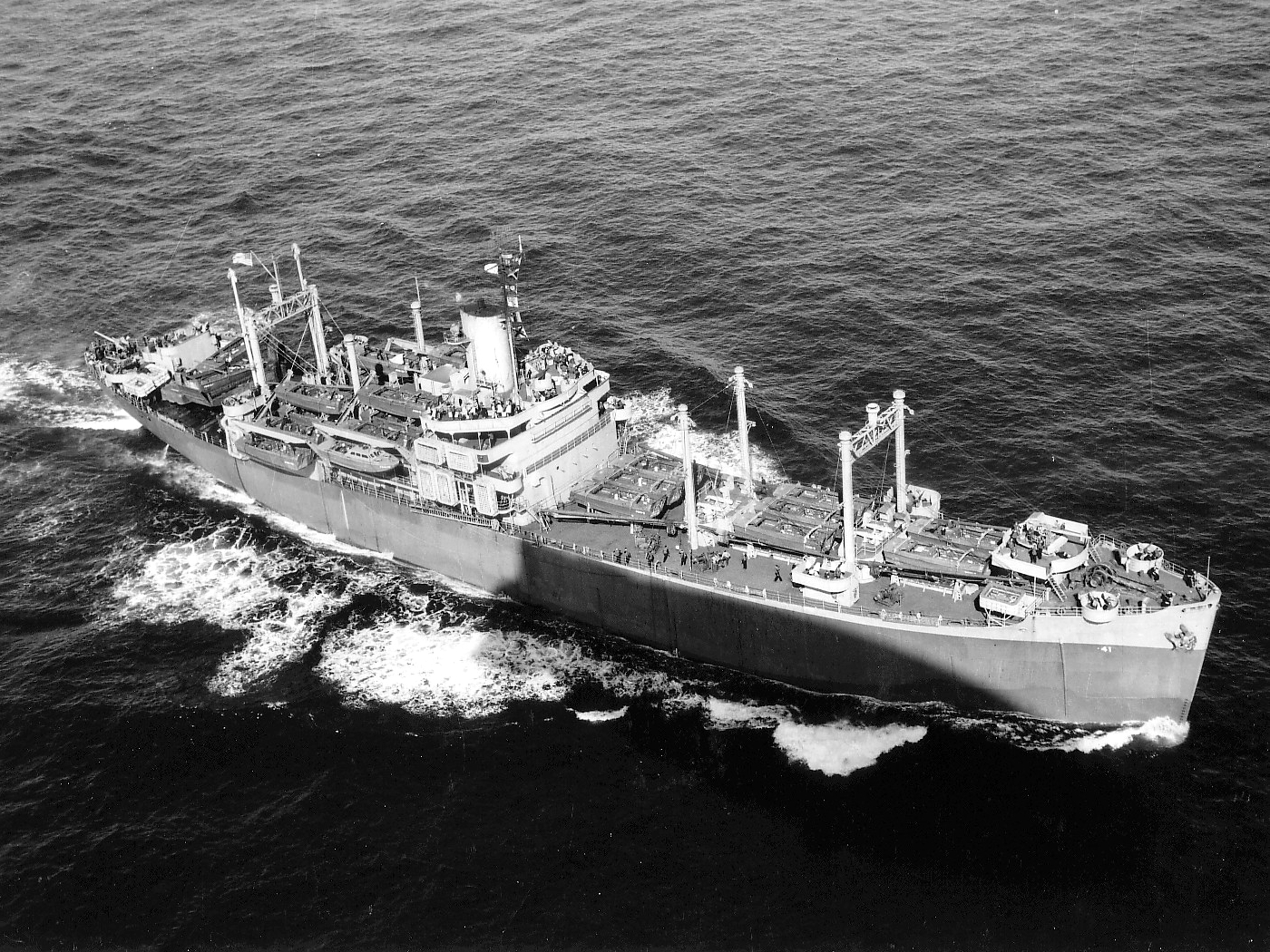
A loaded Bayfield-class attack transport, USS DuPage, underway

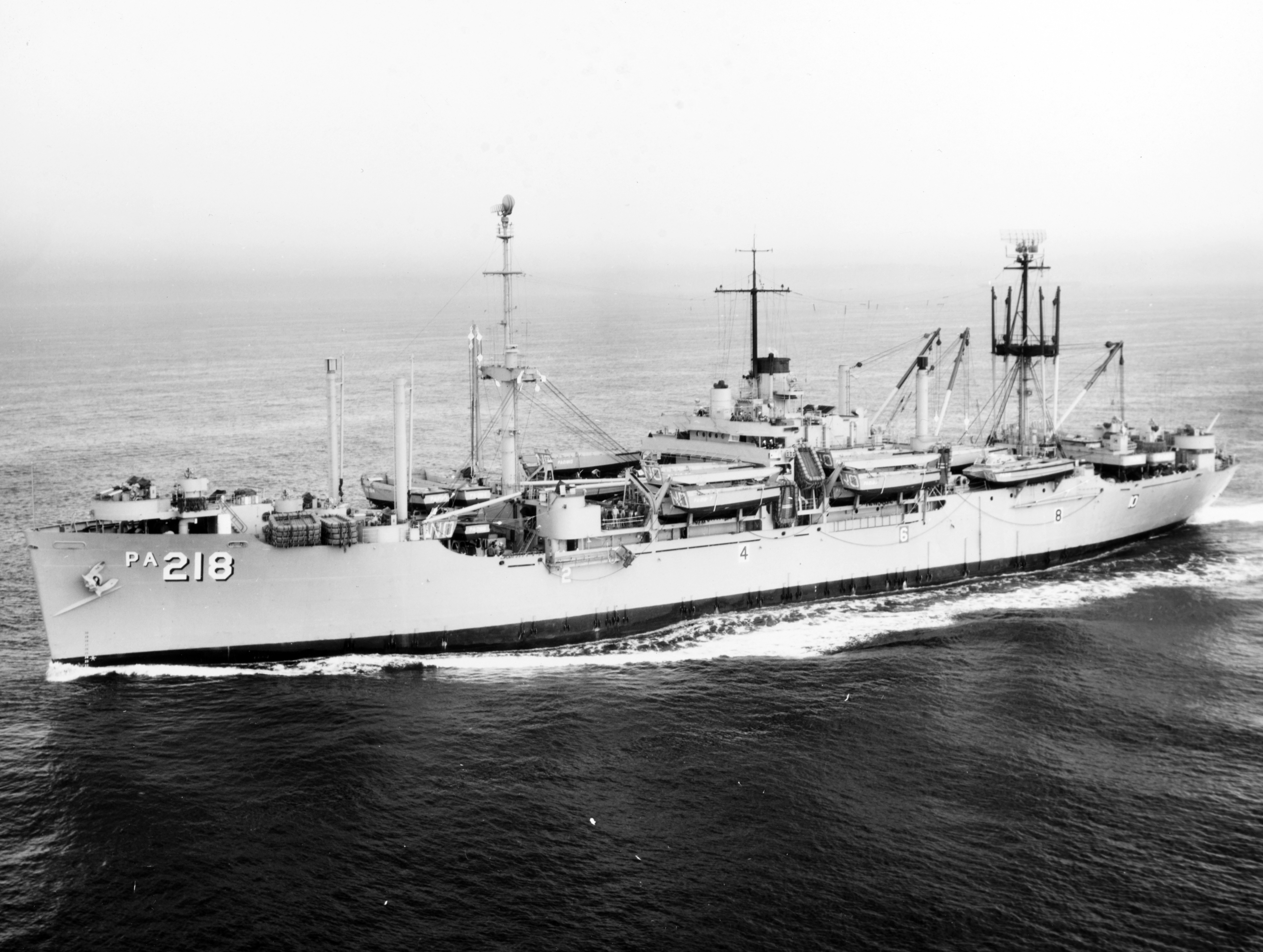
USS Noble, a ship of the Haskell class

Attack transport is a United States Navy ship classification for a variant of ocean-going troopship adapted to transporting invasion forces ashore. Unlike standard troopships – often drafted from the merchant fleet – that rely on either a quay or tenders, attack transports carry their own fleet of landing craft, such as the landing craft, vehicle, personnel (LCVP) or Higgins boat.

They are not to be confused with landing ships, which beach themselves to bring their troops directly ashore, or their general British equivalent, the landing ship, infantry.

A total of 388 APA (troop) and AKA (cargo) attack transports were built for service in World War II in at least fifteen classes. Depending on class they were armed with one or two 5-inch guns and a variety of 40 mm and 20 mm anti-aircraft weapons.

By the late 1960s, 41 of these ships were redesignated with the hull symbol (LPA) landing platform, amphibious, but they all retained their names and hull numbers.

== Classification ==
In the early 1940s, as the United States Navy expanded in response to the threat of involvement in World War II, a number of civilian passenger ships and some freighters were acquired, converted to transports and given hull numbers in the AP series. Some of these were outfitted with heavy boat davits and other arrangements to enable them to handle landing craft for amphibious assault operations.

In 1942, when the AP number series had already extended beyond 100, it was decided that these amphibious warfare ships really constituted a separate category of warship from conventional transports. Therefore, the new classification of auxiliary personnel, attack (APA) was created and numbers assigned to fifty-eight APs (AP Nos. 2, 8-12, 14-18, 25-27, 30, 34-35, 37-40, 48-52, 55-60, 64-65 and 78-101) then in commission or under construction. APA are in the classification of US Navy auxiliary ships.

The actual reclassification of these ships was not implemented until February 1943, by which time two ships that had APA numbers assigned (USS Joseph Hewes and USS Edward Rutledge) had been lost. Another two transports sunk in 1942, USS George F. Elliott and USS Leedstown, were also configured as attack transports but did not survive to be reclassified as such.

As World War II went on, dozens of new construction merchant ships of the United States Maritime Commission's S4, C2, C3 and VC2 ("Victory") types were converted to attack transports, taking the list of APA numbers to 247, though fourteen ships (APAs 181-186 and APAs 240-247) were cancelled before completion. In addition, as part of the 1950s modernization of the Navy's amphibious force with faster ships, two more attack transports (APA-248 and APA-249) were converted from new Type C4-class ships, the Mariner-class freighters.

=== Classes ===
Classes of attack transports included:

- McCawley class (2 ships)
  - both built by the Furness Shipbuilding Company c. 1928 and acquired by the navy in 1940
  - McCawley (APA-4), originally AP-10
  - Barnett (APA-5), AP-11
- Heywood class (5 ships)
  - all built by the Alameda Works Shipyard as merchant ships ca. 1918 and acquired by the navy in 1940
  - Heywood (APA-6), AP-12
  - George F. Elliott (AP-13)
  - Fuller (APA-7), AP-14
  - William P. Biddle (APA-8), AP-15
  - Neville (APA-9), AP-16
- Harry Lee (APA-10), AP-17
- John Penn (APA-23)
- Joseph Hewes (AP-50)
- Edward Rutledge (AP-52)
- Harris class (8 ships)
- Type P1 ship
  - Doyen class (2 ships)
- Type S4 ship
  - Gilliam class (32 ships)
- Victory Ship
  - Haskell class (117 ships)
- Type C2 ship
  - Ormsby class (3 ships)
  - Sumter class (4 ships)
- Type C3 ship
  - Arthur Middleton class (3 ships)
  - Crescent City class (4 ships)
  - Frederick Funston class (2 ships)
  - Windsor class (9 ships)
  - Bayfield class (34 ships)
  - President Jackson class (7 ships)
- Type C4 ship
  - Paul Revere class (2 ship)

== In use ==
During World War II, attack transport served in the Pacific Theatre, taking part in many of the Navy's island hopping campaigns. Some attack transports were assigned to the European Theatre, participating in the invasions of North Africa, Sicily, Italy and Normandy. The last use was for the final WW2 Battle of Okinawa.

Despite an impressive assembly of forces, the Aleutian campaign and the Northern Pacific Theater ranked as Admiral Nimitz's third priority in the overall Pacific Theater for receiving materiel and support. As a result, only attack transport (APA) ships were assigned for the assault, without support from any companion attack cargo (AKA) ships. This created extreme logistics burdens for the invasion force because it resulted in considerable overloading of the transports with both men and equipment. To compound problems, these forces were not able to assemble or train together before executing the Aleutian invasion on 11 May 1943. Lack of equipment and training subsequently resulted in confusion during the landings on Attu.

== Notable incidents ==
- USS Thomas Stone (APA-29) was torpedoed off Cape Palos, Spain, 7 November 1942, and abandoned after going aground in Algiers Harbor, 25 November 1942.
- USS Edward Rutledge (AP-52) on 12 November 1942 was torpedoed by U-130 off Fedala Bay, Morocco commanded by Ernst Kals who slipped past the escort screen to sink three transports. Edward Rutledge's crew attempted to beach her but all power had been lost; she settled rapidly by the stern and sank with the loss of 15 men.
- USS Joseph Hewes (AP-50) on 11 November 1942 took a torpedo hit in No. 2 hold from U-173 during the Naval Battle of Casablanca. The transport settled by the bow and began filling rapidly with water and the order was given to abandon ship. Sank with Captain Smith and approximately 100 seamen.
- USS John Penn (APA-23) was sunk by enemy action off Lunga Point, Guadalcanal on 13 August 1943.
- USS Hinsdale (APA-120) had kamikaze attack damage on 1 April 1945 at Okinawa. Over 15 men were killed. The extensive engine room damage was later repaired.
- USS Henrico (APA-45) had kamikaze attack damage on 2 April 1945 at Okinawa. 37 Navy and 14 Army personnel were killed. At 1828 two 250-pound bombs penetrated two deck levels and exploded on the main deck, resulting in fires and flooding that were not brought under control until 2100.
- USS Telfair (APA-210) on 2 April 1945 was hit by kamikaze attack at Okinawa; the plane hit the side of the ship then dropped into the sea. She was later repaired.
- USS La Grange (APA-124) on 13 August 1945 in Buckner Bay, Okinawa was damaged in last kamikaze attack of WW2, 21 sailors killed and 89 wounded.
- USS Colbert (APA-145) had mine damage on 17 September 1945, off Okinawa, this caused the death of three men and damaged the ship extensively.

== Demise ==
By the end of the 1950s, it was clear that boats would soon be superseded by amphibious tractors (LVTs) and air assault helicopters for landing combat assault troops. These could not be supported by attack transports in the numbers required, and new categories of amphibious ships began to replace APAs throughout the 1960s. By 1969, when the surviving attack transports were redesignated as "amphibious transports" (LPA) (retaining their previous numbers), only a few remained in commissioned service. The last of these were decommissioned in 1980 and sold abroad, leaving only a few thoroughly obsolete World War II era hulls still laid up in the Maritime Administration's reserve fleet. The APA/LPA designation may, therefore, now be safely considered extinct.

== In fiction ==
The 1956 movie Away All Boats presents operations on an attack transport. It was based on a popular novel of the same name, written by an officer who served on one during World War 2.

== See also ==
- Amphibious cargo ship (AKA/LKA). Nearly identical ships used to transport vehicles, supplies and landing craft.
- Landing ship, infantry
- High-speed transport APD
