= Lynnhaven, Virginia =

Lynnhaven
- Borough
- Location within the Commonwealth of Virginia Lynnhaven (the United States)
- Coordinates: 36°48′47.7″N 76°4′5.7″W
- Country: United States
- State: Virginia
- Independent city: Virginia Beach
- Time zone: UTC−5 (Eastern (EST))
  - Summer (DST): UTC−4 (EDT)

Lynnhaven is one of the seven original boroughs created when the city of Virginia Beach, Virginia was formed in 1963. It is located in the North Central portion of the city.

This area was originally located at the mouth of the Lynnhaven Bay inlet. The name has changed over time. First known as Henry Towne, later Lynn Haven, Pleasure House Point, Bayville, and Chesapeake Beach.

== Modern community ==
Today, the Borough of Lynnhaven is home to Lynnhaven Mall and its related shopping and dining options. Major employers within the area include Stihl and Naval Air Station Oceana and once included Lillian Vernon and the corporate headquarters of Home Quarters Warehouse, and Lynnhaven Marine the largest Watercraft Dealer in Virginia.

== City government ==
The Borough of Lynnhaven is currently represented by James L. Wood on the Virginia Beach City Council.
