= USS Heywood =

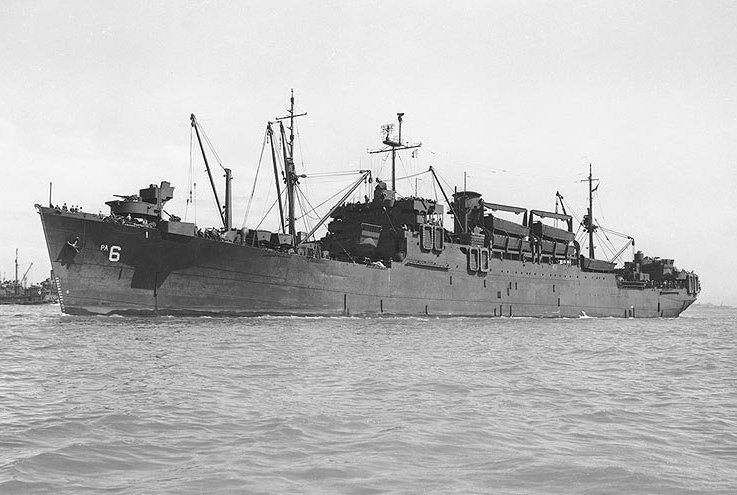
- USS Heywood (APA-6)

History

United States
- Name: USS Heywood (APA-6)
- Namesake: General Charles Heywood, USMC
- Builder: Alameda Works Shipyard
- Launched: 4 November 1918
- Christened: Steadfast
- Acquired: (by the Navy) 26 October 1940
- Commissioned: 7 November 1940
- Decommissioned: 12 April 1946
- In service: Commercial: 1930s-1940; US Navy: 1940-1946
- Renamed: City of Baltimore (1930s); USS Heywood (November 1940)
- Reclassified: AP-12 to APA-6, 1 February 1943
- Honours and awards: Seven battle stars for World War II service
- Fate: Scrapped, 1956

General characteristics
- Class & type: Heywood-class attack transport
- Displacement: 8,000 tons (lt) 14,450 t.(fl)
- Length: 507 ft (155 m)
- Beam: 56 ft (17 m)
- Draft: 25 ft 6 in (7.77 m)
- Propulsion: 1 x De Laval geared turbine drive, 4 x Babcock & Wilcox header-type boilers, 1 propellers, designed shaft horsepower 9,500.
- Speed: 16.8 knots
- Capacity: Troops: 75 Officers, 1,203 Enlisted; Cargo: 150,000 cu ft, 2,900 tons
- Complement: Officers 46, Enlisted 504
- Armament: 4 x 3"/50 cal dual-purpose guns, 2 x twin 40mm gun mounts, 16 x single 20mm gun mounts.

USS Heywood (APA-6) was a Heywood-class attack transport acquired by the U.S. Navy for service as a troop carrier during World War II. She served in the Pacific War, a very dangerous area in the early years of the war, and safely returned home post-war with seven battle stars to her credit.

== Construction, acquisition, and commissioning ==
Heywood was built in 1919 as Steadfast by the Bethlehem Shipbuilding Corporation, Alameda, California. As City of Baltimore she made New York-San Francisco passenger runs for the Panama Pacific Lines throughout the 1930s. She was acquired by the Navy 26 October 1940, renamed Heywood (AP-12), and fitted out as a troop transport at Portland, Oregon, where she commissioned 7 November 1940.

== Pre–World War II North Atlantic operations ==
Heywood cruised as far west as Hawaii before transiting the Panama Canal for Charleston, South Carolina, arriving 14 June 1941. She carried garrison forces for the defense of Iceland and performed neutrality patrol in waters of the West Indies until the infamous raid on Pearl Harbor.

== Transferred to the Pacific when the war broke out ==
She departed Norfolk, Virginia, 10 April 1942 with reinforcements for the Solomon Islands, then replenished at San Pedro, California, before sailing for Wellington, New Zealand.

== Supporting landings on Guadalcanal ==
She embarked U.S. Marines for amphibious warfare training, then sailed to land them in the amphibious assault in the Tulagi-Guadalcanal area 7 August 1942. She shot down an enemy plane 8 August and frequently repelled air attacks as she shuttled desperately needed supplies and troops into Guadalcanal from the New Hebrides, New Caledonia and ports of Australia. Outbound from the besieged Solomons, she evacuated wounded Americans and Japanese captives.

== Supporting the Aleutian campaign ==
Heywood returned to San Pedro, California, 16 January 1943 for repairs. She sailed north 24 April, carrying fighting men who landed 11 May in an amphibious assault on Attu, Aleutian Islands. She returned nearly 500 wounded veterans of the campaign for Attu to San Francisco, California, 6 June, then put to sea with occupation troops landed to occupy Kiska 15 August 1943.

== Assaulting Japanese-held islands ==
Heywood returned to Wellington, New Zealand, 1 October 1943 to train and embark fighting men landed in amphibious assault on bloody Tarawa in the Gilbert Islands 20 November. She returned to Pearl Harbor 3 December for amphibious warfare training culminating in the amphibious assault for the capture of the Marshall Islands which commenced 31 January 1944. She put garrison troops ashore at Kwajalein and Majuro, then landed assault units as Americans swiftly swept on to Eniwetok. With the Marshalls secured, the transport overhauled in San Pedro, California, then returned to the Marshalls 11 May to prepare for the invasion of the Marianas Islands. She landed assault troops at Saipan 16 June and on nearby Tinian 24 July as America took a giant sea step toward Japan herself.

== Supporting the invasion of the Philippines ==
Heywood participated in the long overseas sweep to Leyte in the Philippines, landing assault troops in the initial invasion of 20 October 1944. She had a brief rest at Manus in the Admiralties where she embarked assault troops landed on the shores of Lingayen Gulf 9 January 1945. She landed reinforcements to assist in securing Mindoro 9 February 1945. then returned to the States for overhaul before embarking reinforcements for the capture of Okinawa, the last stepping stone to Japan.

== End-of-war activity ==
The close of hostilities with Japan 15 August 1945 found Heywood in the Philippine Islands. She carried occupation troops into Tokyo Bay 8 September 1945 and continued trooplift operations between Japan and the Philippines until 25 October 1945 when she set course for the western seaboard. After setting veterans ashore at San Diego, California, and at Philadelphia, Pennsylvania, she arrived in Boston, Massachusetts, 3 February 1946.

== Post-war decommissioning ==
She decommissioned there 12 April 1946 and transferred 2 July 1946 to the custody of the Maritime Administration. She was subsequently renamed City of Baltimore. The ship was sold for scrap in 1956.

== Military awards and honors ==
Heywood received seven battle stars for service in World War II:

- Guadalcanal-Tulagi landings (7 August 1942)
- Capture and defense of Guadalcanal (August 1942 to February 1943)
- Gilbert Islands operation (Occupation of Kwajalein and Majuro Atolls, 31 January 1944; Occupation of Eniwetok Atoll, 17 February 1944)
- Marianas operation (Capture and occupation of Saipan, 16 1944)
- Tinian capture and occupation (24 July 1944)
- Leyte operation (Leyte landings, San Pedro Bay, 20 October 1944)
- Luzon operation (Lingayen Gulf landings, 9 January 1945)

== Bibliography ==
- Wright, Christopher C. (1998). "Question 17/97: Screen of Convoys that Includes USS McCawley, April–May 1942". Warship International. XXXV (3). International Naval Research Organization: 307–313. ISSN 0043-0374.
