= USS George F. Elliott (AP-13) =

U.S. Navy ship

Coordinates: 9°20′45″S 160°8′14″E

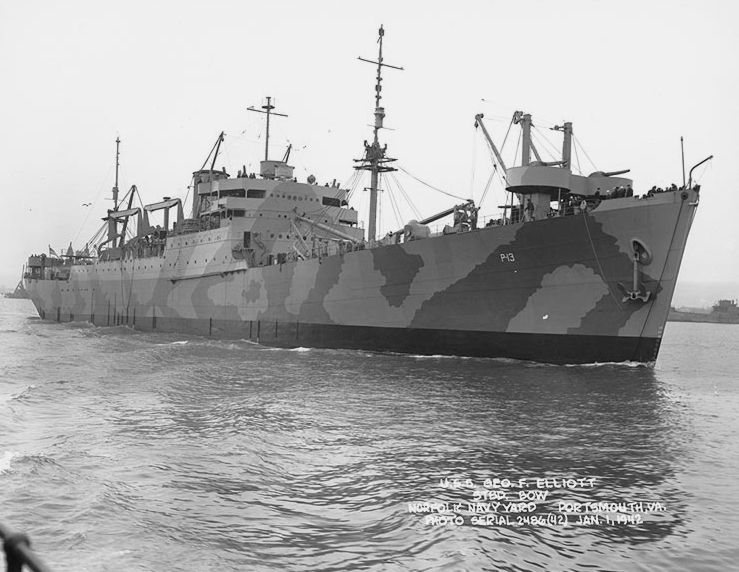
- USS George F. Elliott (AP-13)

History

United States
- Name: War Haven (1918); Victorious (1918); City of Havre (1931); City of Los Angeles (1938); Charles F. Elliott (1941)
- Namesake: USMC Commandant George F. Elliott
- Ordered: as SS War Haven
- Laid down: 1918
- Launched: 4 July 1918
- Acquired: 19 October 1918; 30 October 1940
- Commissioned: USS George F Elliott (AP-13) 10 January 1941
- Stricken: 2 October 1942
- Identification: Official number: 217060
- Fate: Lost to enemy action, 8 August 1942

General characteristics
- Displacement: 7,630 t (lt) 16,400 t (fl)
- Length: as ID-3514 – 440 ft 0.5 in (134.1 m); as AP-13 – 507 ft (155 m)
- Beam: 56 ft (17 m)
- Draft: 29 ft 9 in (9.07 m)
- Propulsion: (as built) Geared steam turbines developing about 3,000 shp (2,237 kW); (as modified) Four Babcock & Wilcox header-type boilers; one De Laval Steam Turbine, geared turbine drive; single propeller; designated 9,500 shp (7,084 kW)
- Speed: 10.5 knots (19 km/h).
- Capacity: 150,000 ft^{3} (4,248 m^{3}), 2,900 t.
- Complement: as ID-3514 – 97; as AP-13 – 350
- Armament: 1 x 5"/38 dual purpose gun mount; 4 x 3"/50 dual purpose gun mounts; 8 x .50 cal (12.7 mm) machine guns

USS George F. Elliott (AP-13) was a transport acquired by the U.S. Navy during World War II. The ship was originally ordered for WW I British commercial service as War Haven and requisitioned by the United States Shipping Board (USSB) before completion as Victorious. The Navy acquired and commissioned Victorious for brief service with the Naval Overseas Transportation Service (NOTS) before return to the USSB for commercial operation both under the USSB and commercial lines, the later as City of Havre and City of Los Angeles.

The Navy reacquired the ship for service as a troop transport during World War II. In 1942, she was attacked off Guadalcanal by Japanese planes and sank shortly thereafter. The sister ships with similar history were reclassified in February 1943 as attach transports, APA, to be termed the Heywood-class attack transports but George F. Elliott was sunk before that reclassification. (Note: At the time of loss the ship would have been groped as a Heywood class transport.)

== Construction and pre-World War II history ==
The ship was laid down in 1918, as SS War Haven at Bethlehem Shipbuilding Corporation Alameda Works Shipyard as hull # 163 for the British Shipping Controller, London, requisitioned during construction and completed by the USSB. The ship was launched 4 July 1918 as Victorious, completed in October and assigned official number 217060. Original propulsion was by geared steam turbines developing about 3,000 shaft horsepower for a speed of about 11 knots.

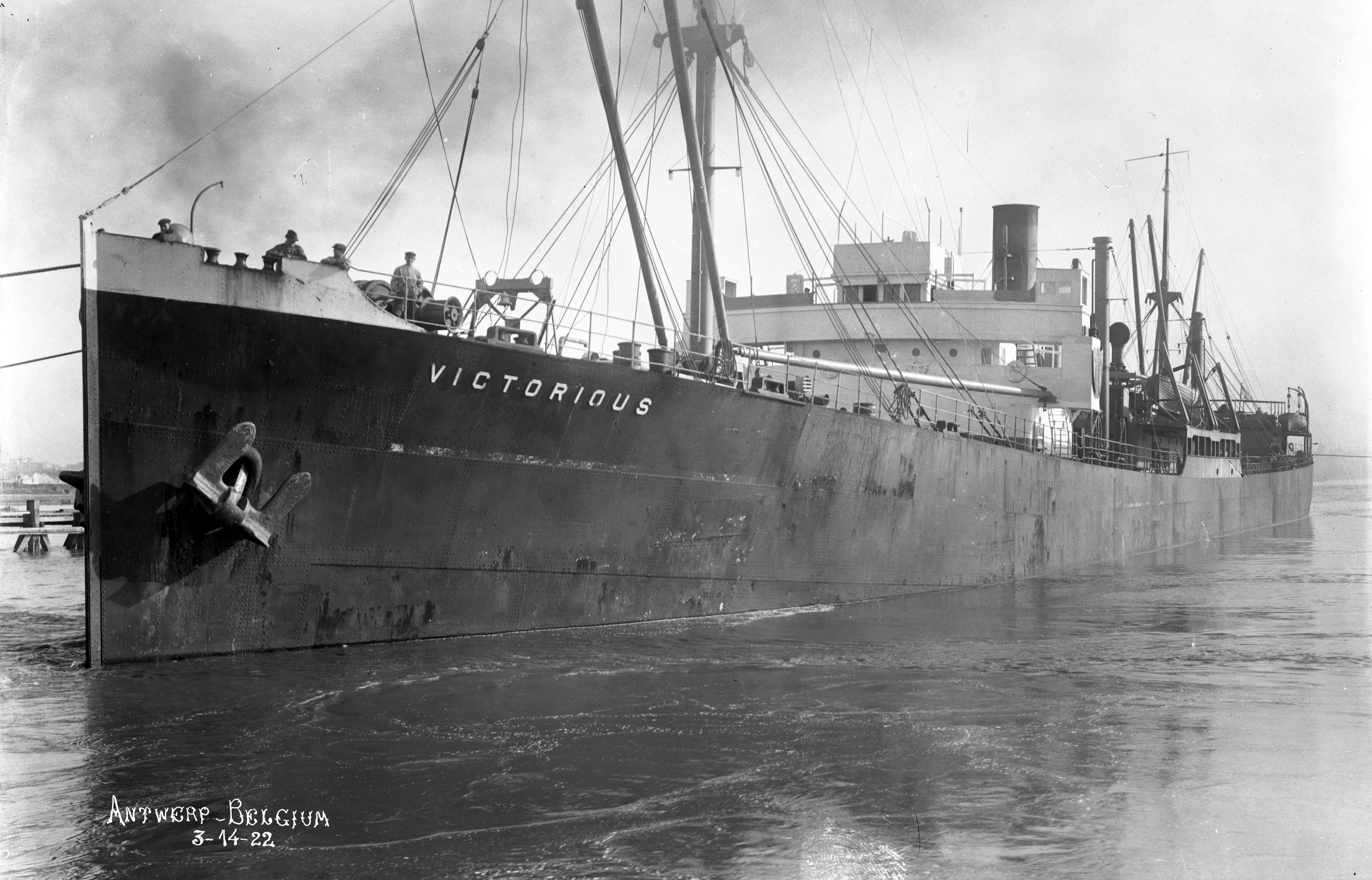
Victorious arriving at Antwerp, 14 March 1922

Victorious was acquired by the US Navy and commissioned Victorious (ID-3514), 19 October 1918. The ship was operated by the NOTS the ship made one trip, after the armistice ended the war, from the United States West Coast to New York from which departed after Christmas 1918 on a voyage to London with arrival on 14 January 1919 with a load of flour. Victorious departed London 30 January loaded with 2,300 tons of steel billets and 200 steel rails with arrival in New York on 13 February. The ship was decommissioned and struck from the Naval Register on 25 February 1919, at New York and returned to the USSB for operation. (Note: The USSB retained ownership during Navy operation.)

In 1920 propulsion was converted to steam turbine generator and electric propulsion by a 3,000 horsepower electric motor directly connected to the propeller shaft. The ship was then operated commercially by the USSB until sold in 1931. Victorious was one of five ships acquired by the Baltimore Mail S.S. Co. in 1931, from the USSB, for its North Atlantic service with Victorious being renamed SS City of Havre. (Note: The others were City of Baltimore, City of Norfolk, City of Newport News and City of Hamburg.) The ship was lengthened another 50 feet (15 m) with bow and stern lines modified according to designs by Gibbs and Cox, Inc., of New York City with propulsion machinery replaced by De Laval cross compound, double reduction gear turbines developing 9,500 shaft horsepower at 95 rpm on the shaft for a speed of better than 16 knots. (Note: Trial speeds of all five ships ranged from 17.7 to 18.4 knots with average speed of multiple vessels over 13 voyages averaging 16.82 knots.) Steam was provided by four Babcock and Wilson oil fired water tube boilers. Accommodations for 63 passengers were added with final dimensions of 506 feet (154.2 m) length overall (LOA), 486 feet 7.5 inches (148.3 m) length between perpendiculars (LBP), 56 feet (17.1 m) molded beam, a normal draft of 24 feet (7.3 m) and of 8,424 GRT. All five of the ships acquired by Baltimore Mail had new short and medium wave radio equipment and radio direction finders installed.

City of Havre was one of the five "City" ships acquired by Panama Pacific Lines from Baltimore Mail for its inter-coastal service in 1938 and renamed SS City of Los Angeles. (Note: Three of the ships retained their names on transfer with City of Havre becoming City of Los Angeles and City of Hamburg becoming City of San Francisco.) At the time of transfer the ship had accumulated 68 trips and 544,000 miles in the Atlantic.

== World War II ==
As World War II approached, City of Los Angeles was acquired by the Navy on 30 October 1940, converted to a Naval Transport, and commissioned George F. Elliott (AP-13) after Major General George F. Elliott on 10 January 1941.

=== North Atlantic operations ===
George F. Elliott sailed for Norfolk, Virginia, 16 January 1941, and for the next year carried units of the 1st Marine Brigade to the Caribbean for training exercises and operated out of Norfolk, before departing New York, 19 February 1942, with over 1,100 troops bound for Europe. After joining a convoy off Halifax, Nova Scotia, she reached Belfast, Northern Ireland, 3 March, to debark her passengers and returned to New York, 25 March. The men aboard George F. Elliott on the February 1942, trip were members of the 107th Combat Engineer Battalion from Michigan.

=== Pacific Theatre ===
After embarking 1,229 soldiers, the ship got underway on 9 April, with a convoy bound for Tongatapu, arriving one month later and debarking her troops. George F. Elliott sailed 19 May, and arrived San Francisco, California, 5 June, for repairs.

Soon ready for sea, she embarked 1,300 men of the 2d Battalion, 1st Marines, and stood out under the Golden Gate Bridge 22 June, in convoy, reaching Wellington, New Zealand, 11 July, where combat gear and stores were loaded. As part of Task Force 62 she departed 22 July, for the 1st Marine Division's amphibious assault on Guadalcanal. After conducting landing maneuvers in the Fiji Islands, she proceeded to Guadalcanal.

=== Sinking ===
Closing Lunga Point on D-day, 7 August, George F. Elliott sent her boats away at 0733 hrs. and simultaneously began discharging cargo. Despite enemy air attacks she continued to work far into the night, ceasing unloading only when the beach became too congested.

Morning on 8 August found George F. Elliott and her crew still awaiting the order to resume sending the balance of her cargo ashore when radar screens on the US destroyer pickets began to show an approaching flight of Japanese planes heading straight for the landing group. Weighing anchor and raising steam to get underway shortly before 11:00. George F. Elliott moved out of the landing area into the open waters of Ironbottom Sound and her crew readied their weapons to meet the inbound Mitsubishi G4M 'Betty' bombers coming over Florida Island. Making her 10.5 knot top speed and weaving between US destroyers and other transports as they avoided and fired on the Japanese torpedo bombers skimming mere feet above the waters surface, the gunners on George F. Elliott sighted a 'Betty' closing on their starboard side, only 30 feet (9.1 m) off the water. Taking the plane under concentrated fire and scoring several hits, the gun crews were unable to down the Japanese bomber before it suddenly popped up and slammed into the ship, just aft of the superstructure on the Starboard side.

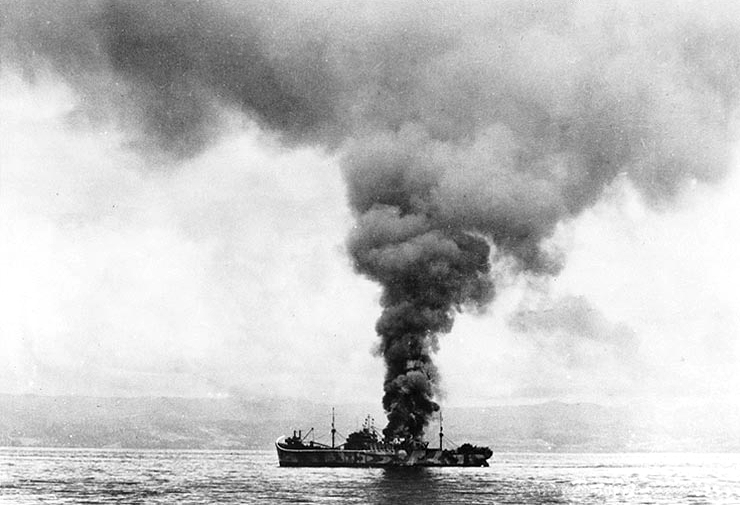
George F. Elliott burning off Guadalcanal.

Though the lightly armored 'Betty' disintegrated on impact with the hull of George F. Elliott, wreckage and burning gasoline showered the deck and its engines were able to punch through the unarmored hull into the rear cargo hold, severing the ships rear fire main in the process. A massive fire broke out onboard both topside and deep within the hull, where supplies destined for shore now fed the flames which the crew raced to contain. Fires below deck quickly grew out of control and forced the engine room crew to abandon their stations, bringing George F. Elliott to a stop in the middle of Ironbottom Sound. Using a bucket brigade and whatever means they could to fight the fires, the crew made a valiant stand against the advancing flames as the continuing Japanese attack kept nearby ships from providing any assistance to the burning transport. By the time the remnants of the Japanese bomber force had departed the area it was too late for George F. Elliott, as the intense flames caused a damaged bulkhead to fail, releasing bunker fuel into the rear hold and turning a massive fire into an inferno. Shortly after 13:00, the crew was ordered to abandon ship.

George F. Elliott, burning beyond control, was sunk on the evening of 8 August, by Hull.

George F. Elliott was struck from the Navy List 2 October 1942, and was awarded one battle star for World War II service.

== The Pacific, HBO miniseries ==
The Pacific is based in part upon Helmet for My Pillow, the memoir of Robert Leckie, a member of the 1st Marines who sailed from San Francisco to Guadalcanal aboard George F. Elliott. The Elliot herself is seen prominently as the Marines make their landing on Guadalcanal.
