= Heywood-class attack transport =

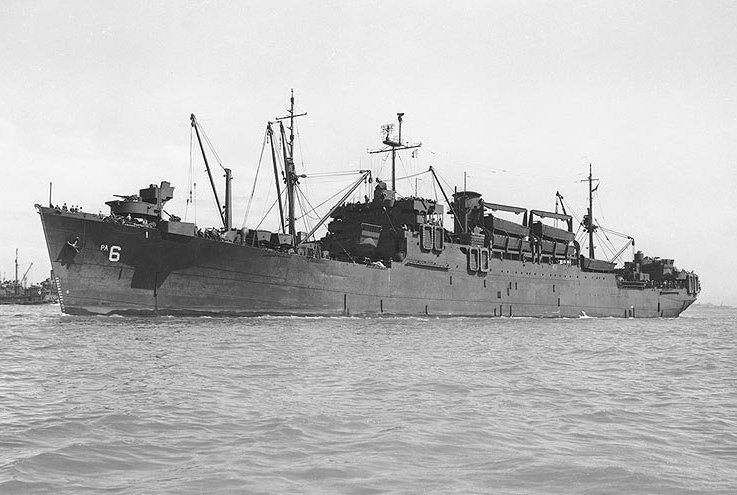
- USS Heywood (APA-6), lead ship of the Heywood class

Class overview
- Name: Heywood class
- Builders: Alameda Works Shipyard
- Operators: United States Navy
- Preceded by: McCawley class
- Succeeded by: Harry Lee class
- Built: 1919
- In service: Commercial: 1920-1940
- In commission: Navy: 1940-1946
- Completed: 5 (acquired)
- Lost: 1
- Retired: 4

General characteristics
- Class & type: Heywood-class attack transport
- Displacement: 8,000 tons (lt) 14,450 t.(fl)
- Length: 507 ft (155 m)
- Beam: 56 ft (17 m)
- Draft: 25 ft 6 in (7.77 m)
- Propulsion: 1 × De Laval geared turbine drive, 4 × Babcock & Wilcox header-type boilers, 1 propeller, designed shaft horsepower 9,500
- Speed: 16-17 knots
- Capacity: Troops: 60-75 officers, 818-1,203 enlisted; Cargo: 145,000-150,000 cu ft, 1,800-2,900 tons
- Complement: 43-50 officers, 337-524 enlisted
- Armament: (1945): 4 × 3"/50 cal dual-purpose guns, 4 × 40mm gun mounts, 8-16 × single 20mm gun mounts..

The Heywood-class attack transport was a class of US Navy attack transport built in 1918–19. Four were ordered for British use but requisitioned by the United States Shipping Board (USSB) for WW I service when the U.S. entered that war. All saw commercial service under the USSB and commercial lines until acquired by the Navy in 1940 and converted, some to transports, and eventually all into attack transports for World War II service.

Like all attack transports, the purpose of the Heywood class ships was to transport troops and their equipment to hostile shores in order to execute amphibious invasions. To fulfill their mission, attack transports were fitted with a substantial number of integral landing craft, and were well armed with antiaircraft weaponry to protect themselves and their vulnerable cargo of troops from air attack in the battle zone.

== Background ==
The Heywood class is amongst the few classes of attack transport that were converted from pre-war tonnage rather than built from either Maritime Commission or Victory ship hull types during the war.

Four of the five ships, Heywood being the exception, were ordered by the British Shipping Controller under construction at Union Iron Works Alameda yard and requisitioned by the United States Shipping Board when the United States entered World War I. Upon requisition the British ordered ships, with "War" first in the name, were renamed before completion. They were all completed with the original steam plant driving a turbine generator powering an electric drive. Eclipse, later William P. Biddle, was the first United States commercial cargo vessel with electric drive. All, including Heywood, operated commercially until sold in 1931 to the Baltimore Mail Steamship Company.

All the ships were reconstructed for that line's service between Baltimore, Britain and France. Federal Shipbuilding & Dry Dock Company, Kearny, N. J. modified the ships to a Gibbs & Cox design. The length was increased from 440 ft 1.5 in (134.2 m). between perpendiculars to 486 ft 7.5 in (148.3 m) with 56 ft (17.1 m) molded beam and 24 ft (7.3 m) draft. A raked bow and new stern were added along with accommodations for 81 passengers. The original propulsion was replaced with a steam plant of four Babcock & Wilcox water-tube boilers powering a De Laval compound double reduction geared turbine for a speed of over 17 kn (20 mph; 31 km/h) on trials.

After the Maritime Commission ruled the Baltimore Mail routes were a non-essential service in 1937 the ships were sold in 1938 to the Panama-Pacific Line for operation between the U.S. East and West coasts. (Note: The ships, in order of original USSB names followed by original name and U.S. official number, are: Archer (War Wave) 217596 became Fuller; Eclipse (War Surf) 217456 became William P. Biddle; Steadfast (no British name) 217921 became Heywood; Independence (War Harbour) 217172 became Neville and Victorious (War Haven) 217060 became George F. Elliot)

In November–December 1940, the US Navy acquired all five of the ships and converted them into troop transports, a process that took three to five months. The ships subsequently entered service between November 1940 and May 1941. In 1942, they underwent further modification into attack transports.

== In service ==
The ships saw most of their action in the Pacific Theatre, but the William P. Biddle also participated in Operation Torch (the North African landings), and both Biddle and Neville took part in the invasion of Sicily. All but Biddle took part in the Guadalcanal campaign, and all four participated in various other Pacific Theatre landings. The class as a whole earned 28 battle stars for World War II service, an average of seven stars apiece.

Immediately after the war, most of the ships were occupied in deploying troops for occupation duties in newly conquered Japan and in bringing home demobilizing servicemen in Operation Magic Carpet.

All four ships were decommissioned shortly after the war in March–April 1946. They appear to have been scrapped in the mid-1950s.
