= Paul Mendelssohn Bartholdy =

German chemist (1841–1880), son of Felix

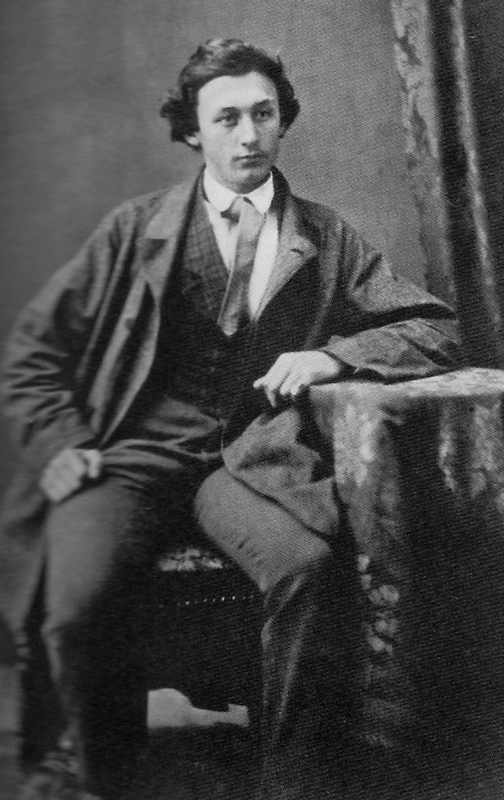
Paul Mendelssohn Bartholdy, c. 1870

Paul Mendelssohn Bartholdy (born Paul Felix Abraham Mendelssohn Bartholdy; 18 January 1841, Leipzig – 17 February 1880, Berlin) was a German chemist and a pioneer in the manufacture of aniline dye. He co-founded the Aktien-Gesellschaft für Anilin-Fabrikation (AGFA), a German chemical company.

He is not to be confused with his uncle, the banker Paul Mendelssohn-Bartholdy, who was the son of his grandfather Abraham Mendelssohn Bartholdy.

== Life ==
Paul Mendelssohn Bartholdy was the second son of the composer Felix Mendelssohn Bartholdy and Cécile Charlotte Sophie Jeanrenaud. His aunt was Fanny Hensel. His grandfather was Abraham Mendelssohn Bartholdy. His maternal great-grandfather was Daniel Itzig, and his paternal great-grandfather was Moses Mendelssohn. He studied sciences at Heidelberg University, where Robert Bunsen was amongst his colleagues. After graduating in 1863 he went to Berlin to study with Wilhelm Hoffmann.

He volunteered as a soldier in the Austro-Prussian War of 1866, taking part in the Battle of Königgrätz and becoming an officer. (He was later to be recalled for the Franco-Prussian War, where he won the Iron Cross).

After the Austro-Prussian War he met with Alexander Martius, a former student of Justus von Liebig, who had set up a dye factory in England. They decided to enter a partnership to manufacture aniline in Germany, setting up a factory at the Rummelsburg Lake near Berlin. In 1873 the firm took the name 'Aktien-Gesellschaft für Anilin-Fabrikation', becoming in 1898 'AGFA'.

Mendelssohn Bartholdy married his cousin Elisabeth Oppenheim (granddaughter of his great-uncle Joseph Mendelssohn) (1845–1868). She died shortly after the birth of their son Otto. Paul later married Elisabeth's sister Enole (1855–1939), by whom he had four children.

In 1880, Mendelssohn Bartholdy died of a heart attack, aged just 39. After his death, the company was led by his nephew Franz Oppenheim (1852–1929) and his son Robert Paul Hugo Mendelssohn Bartholdy (1879–1956), who had a phD in chemistry. In 1925, it became part of IG Farben.

== See also ==
- Paul von Mendelssohn-Bartholdy
- Lotte von Mendelssohn-Bartholdy
- Margarete Oppenheim

== Sources ==
- Schoeps, Julius S. (2009). Das Erbe der Mendelssohns. Frankfurt-am-Main.
