= Loeb (surname) =

Loeb or Löb is a surname of German and Yiddish origin. It is derived from the word lion in German and Yiddish in different historic and dialectal forms (Löwe, Lewe, Löb, Leb, Leib). In Yiddish it is mostly written לייב (Leib). People with the surname include:

== Löb ==
- Eliezer Löb (1837–1892), German rabbi
- Ladislaus Löb (1933–2021), professor emeritus of German and author
- Leopold Löb, birth name of Leopold Einstein (1833–1890), German Esperantist
- Martin Löb (1921–2006), German mathematician
- Rudolf Löb (1877–1966), German banker

== Loeb ==
- Avi Loeb, theoretical astrophysicist
- Albert Henry Loeb (1868–1924), attorney and Sears, Roebuck executive; father of murderer Richard Loeb
- Arthur Lee Loeb (1923–2002) Dutch scientist and crystallographer
- Carl M. Loeb, President of the American Metal Company and founder of Carl M. Loeb & Co., later Loeb Rhoades & Co. and father of John Langeloth Loeb Sr.
- Chuck Loeb (1955–2017), American jazz guitarist
- Daniel S. Loeb, American hedge fund manager and founder of Third Point LLC
- Gerald M. Loeb, businessman and financial writer
- Harold Loeb (1891–1974), American writer and publisher
- Jacques Loeb (1859–1924), German-born American physiologist and biologist
- James Loeb (1867–1933), banker, son of Solomon Loeb and founder of the Loeb Classical Library
- James I. Loeb (1908–1992), American politician and activist
- Jamie Loeb (born 1995), American tennis player
- Janice Loeb (1902–1996), American cinematographer, screenwriter, film director and producer
- John Jacob Loeb (1910–1970), American composer and son of Jacob Moritz Loeb, the American businessman and philanthropist
- John Langeloth Loeb Sr. (1902–1996), American banker
- John Langeloth Loeb Jr. (1930–), American businessman and diplomat
- Jeph Loeb, American film and television writer, producer and comic book writer
- Leo Loeb, physician
- Lisa Loeb (born 1968), American singer-songwriter and actress
- Marshall Loeb (1929–2017), American author, editor, commentator and columnist specializing in business matters
- Matilee Loeb Evans (1879-1963), American composer
- Nicholas M. Loeb (born 1975), American businessman
- Paul Rogat Loeb (born 1952), American writer and social activist
- Peter A. Loeb, American mathematician
- Philip Loeb (1892–1955), American actor blacklisted by the House Un-American Activities Committee
- Richard Loeb (1905–1936), American murderer, part of Leopold and Loeb
- Rudolf Löb (1877–1966), German banker, Mendelssohn & Co.
- Sébastien Loeb (born 1974), French Rally driver, 9 times World Rally Champion
- Solomon Loeb (1828–1903), American banker, founder of investment bank Kuhn, Loeb & Co. and father of James Loeb
- Sophie Irene Loeb-Simon (1876–1929), American journalist and social welfare advocate
- Susanna Loeb, American educational economist
- Vernon Loeb, American journalist
- William Loeb Jr. (1866–1937), secretary to President Theodore Roosevelt
- William Loeb III (1905–1981), publisher of the Manchester Union Leader newspaper

== Fictional characters ==
- Gillian B. Loeb, fictional character in the DC universe

== See also ==
- Loeb (disambiguation)
- Loewe (disambiguation)
- Löwe (disambiguation)
