= Kunsthandlung Julius Böhler =

German art gallery

The Munich art dealership Julius Böhler was one of the largest and most important in the German-speaking world in the first half of the 20th century.

== History ==
The art dealership was founded in 1880 by Julius Böhler (1860-1934), who acquired a property at Brienner Strasse 12, where he built an Italian palazzo-style building. His sons - Julius Wilhelm Böhler (1883-1966, also known as "Lulu") and Otto Alfons Böhler (1887-1950) - joined the business as partners in 1906 and 1910 respectively. The latter, together with the Cologne-born art dealer Fritz Steinmeyer (1880-1959), founded the "Kunsthandlung Böhler und Steinmeyer" in New York City, which offered items on consignment from Munich. Julius Wilhelm Böhler remained a partner in the Munich branch until 1954.

In 1919, Julius Wilhelm Böhler moved to Lucerne, where he founded the "Kunsthandel AG Luzern" with Fritz Steinmeyer. At the beginning of 1928, they also expanded to New York - with the participation of circus entrepreneur John Ringling - and the company "Böhler & Steinmeyer Inc." "Kunsthandel AG Luzern" and the "Kunsthaus Julius Böhler" in Munich were shareholders of "Böhler & Steinmeyer Inc." which lasted until 1935. They also tried to gain a foothold in Berlin, but the branch did not last long.

From 1928, Julius Wilhelm's son, Julius Harry Böhler (1907-1979), managed the Munich parent house together with his uncle Otto Alfons and the art historian Hans Sauermann (1885-1960), who had joined the company in 1916 and was a partner from 1922 to 1956. Fritz Steinmeyer joined the company as a silent partner in 1926. The company founder Julius Böhler retired as a partner in 1930. The company had close relations with Kleinberger in Paris and New York.

== Nazi era ==
As an "Aryan"-run business, the Kunsthandlung was able to continue trading during the Nazi period. From 1936 to 1938, four auctions were held. These included the estate of Margarethe Oppenheim as well as works from the Staatliche Museen zu Berlin. Together with Karl Haberstock, the gallery acquired a large part of the Fritz Gutmann Collection.

The investigators of the Art Looting Investigation Unit considered Julius Böhler Jr. to be deeply involved in Nazi-looted art, writing in their official report in 1946:

"Boehler, Julius Jr. Munich, Briennerstrasse 12. Grandson of the late Julius Boehler of Munich; son of Julius Boehler Sr of Lucerne. Partner of Sauermann. Close contact of Haberstock. Strong Nazi. Travelled in Holland and Italy. With Haberstock, purchased an important section of the Gutmann collection."

== Postwar ==
After 1945, the three managing directors, Julius Harry Böhler, Otto Alfons Böhler and Hans Sauermann, resumed business relatively quickly. In 1956, Julius Gustav Böhler (1929-2010), the grandson of the company's founder, joined the company as a partner and became sole owner after the death of his father Julius Harry in 1979. The company continued to maintain its position as one of the most important art dealers in Munich. In 2004 - after 124 years - the headquarters in Munich were given up. Still family-owned, the "Kunsthaus Julius Böhler" continues its tradition at the location in Starnberg under the management of Florian Eitle-Böhler.

== Archive ==
Business records of the Böhler art trade have been stored in the Bavarian Business Archives in Munich since 1996. The sub-stores include stock books from 1880 to 1976, correspondence from 1931 to 1976, and stock books and correspondence from the branch office in Lucerne. As of 2015, 34,600 index cards on all traded objects, an archive of 7831 photo folders (from 1918), and a Munich customer file on private and institutional customers are also collected at the Munich Central Institute for Art History. The indexing and documentation of this data collection is supported by the Ernst von Siemens Art Foundation and the German Center for the Loss of Cultural Property. The material is being processed at the Zentralinstitut für Kunstgeschichte for a research database.

== Restitution claims for artworks that passed through Böhler (selection) ==
In 2004, the Burrell collection in Glasgow was told by a government panel to restitute an artwork that it had acquired through Julius Bohler. La Pate de Jambon, attributed to Pierre Chardin, had belonged to a Jewish family who were forced to sell it under the Nazi regime.

In 2011: Portrait of a young woman with a drawing instrument by Carl Christian Vogel von Vogelstein was restituted to the Rosauer heirs by Dresden’s Gemäldegalerie. Seized by the Nazis in 1938, it was acquired in 1938 in Vienna for 800 Reichsmark by Julius Böhler who then sold it in 1940 for 4,500 Reichsmark to Hans Posse, Director of the Dresden Gemäldegalerie and head of Hitler’s SpecialCommission Linz.

In 2012 the Landesmuseum Württemberg returned two renaissance clocks to the heirs of Eugen Gutmann, founder of the Dresdner Bank. "The clocks had been the subject of a forced sale to the Nazi dealer Julius Böhler of Munich in 1942 by Gutmann's son, Fritz, who lived in The Netherlands and was subsequently deported with his wife and murdered."

== Literature ==
- Birgit Jooss: La Kunsthandlung Böhler Munich, in: Répertoire des acteurs du marché de l'art en France sous l'Occupation, 1940–1945 (RAMA), in deutscher und französischer Sprache, https://agorha.inha.fr/database/76 [Freischaltung 3 December 2021], Suche:Böhler
- Anja Ebert: „… so wär’s schon sehr nett wenn Sie recht bald wieder kommen könnten“. Die Geschäftsbeziehungen von Henri Heilbronner und Julius Böhler in der NS-Zeit. In: Anja Ebert, Timo Saalmann, Anne-Cathrin Schreck (Hrsg.): Gekauft – Getauscht – Geraubt? Erwerbungen des Germanischen Nationalmuseums zwischen 1933 und 1945. Nürnberg 2017, S. 38–43, (online)
- Timo Saalmann: Langjährige Kontakte. Die Münchener Kunsthandlung Julius Böhler. In: Gekauft – getauscht – geraubt?, in: Anja Ebert, Timo Saalmann, Anne-Cathrin Schreck (Hrsg.): Gekauft – Getauscht – Geraubt? Erwerbungen des Germanischen Nationalmuseums zwischen 1933 und 1945. Nürnberg 2017, S. 24–37.
- Sophie Katharina Oeckl: Die Zusammenarbeit der Kunsthandlungen Julius Böhler München und Karl Haberstock Berlin: Eine Analyse gemeinsam gehandelter Gemälde zwischen 1936 und 1945. Masterarbeit, München 2015. Digitalisat
- Meike Hopp: Kunsthandel im Nationalsozialismus. Adolf Weinmüller in München und Wien, Köln 2012, v. a. S. 112–121.
- Richard Winkler: Jüdische Kunstsammler als Kunden der Kunsthandlung Julius Böhler in München 1890–1938. In: Landesstelle für die nichtstaatlichen Museen in Bayern (Hrsg.): Verantwortung wahrnehmen. Kulturgutverlust, Provenienzforschung und Restitution (= Museumsbausteine. 11.) München / Berlin 2007, S. 89–101.
- Richard Winkler: Der Archivbestand der Münchner Kunsthandlung Julius Böhler im Bayerischen Wirtschaftsarchiv. In: Archive in Bayern. 3. 2007, S. 39–48.
- Richard Winkler: „Händler, die ja nur ihrem Beruf nachgingen“. Die Münchner Kunsthandlung Julius Böhler und die Auflösung jüdischer Kunstsammlungen im Dritten Reich. In: Andrea Baresel-Brand (Bearb.): Entehrt. Ausgeplündert. Arisiert. Entrechtung und Enteignung der Juden (= Veröffentlichungen der Koordinierungsstelle für Kulturgutverluste. 3), Magdeburg 2005, S. 207–246.
