= The Muse Inspiring the Poet =

1909 painting by Henri Rousseau

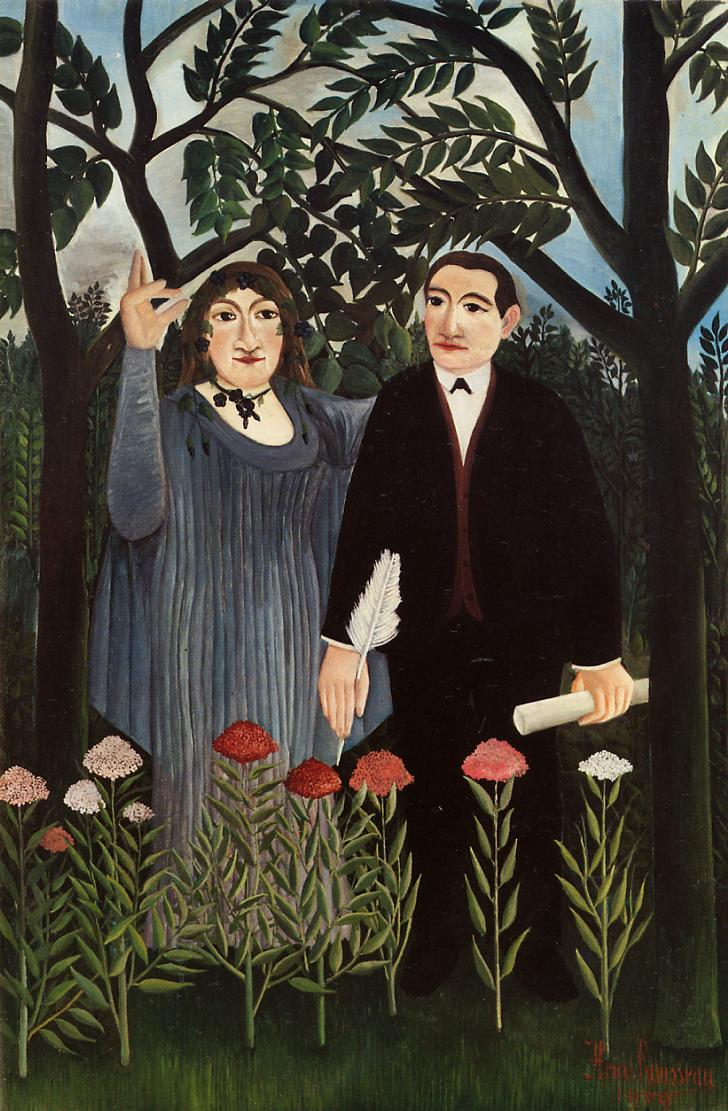
- Artist: Henri Rousseau
- Year: 1909
- Medium: oil on canvas
- Movement: Naïve art
- Dimensions: 146.2 cm × 96.9 cm (57.6 in × 38.1 in)
- Location: Kunstmuseum Basel; Basel, Switzerland

The Muse Inspiring the Poet is a 1909 oil-on-canvas painting by the French artist Henri Rousseau, forming a double portrait of Marie Laurencin and Guillaume Apollinaire. Owned for a time by Paul Rosenberg, it is now in the Kunstmuseum Basel. Another version of the work is now in the Pushkin Museum in Moscow.

In 2021, the heirs of Charlotte von Wesdehlen, the widow of the Jewish art collector Paul von Mendelssohn-Bartholdy, requested that the Kunstmuseum Basel restitute the work. The museum purchased it in 1940 through the Swiss art dealer Christoph Bernoulli, Basel.
