= Rudolf Löb =

German banker

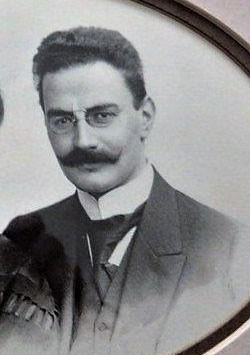
- Rudolf Löb
- Born: November 21, 1877; Elberfeld, Prussia
- Died: January 30, 1966 (aged 88); Boston, Massachusetts, United States
- Occupation: Banker
- Employer: Mendelssohn & Co.

Rudolf Löb (November 21, 1877 – January 30, 1966) was a German banker with Mendelssohn & Co. and consultant to the German and Russian governments.

== Life ==
Löb became personal liable partner with Mendelssohn & Co. in 1919. Following the death of Franz von Mendelssohn and Paul von Mendelssohn-Bartholdy in 1935, Löb was appointed as chairman of Mendelssohn & Co. bank as the first non-family member. In the 1930s, he served as the Belgian General Consul in Berlin. In 1938, he was pressured by the Nazis' Aryanisation policy to break up Mendelssohn & Co. and hand over most of its assets to Deutsche Bank. Löb emigrated to Argentina in 1939 and to the United States in 1948. He died on January 30, 1966.
