= Lotte von Mendelssohn-Bartholdy =

German Jewish art collector (1877–1946)

Lotte von Mendelssohn-Bartholdy (born Charlotte Reichenheim on March 25, 1877 in Berlin; died as Countess von Wesdehlen on June 6, 1946 in Geneva) was a German author and art collector.

== Life ==
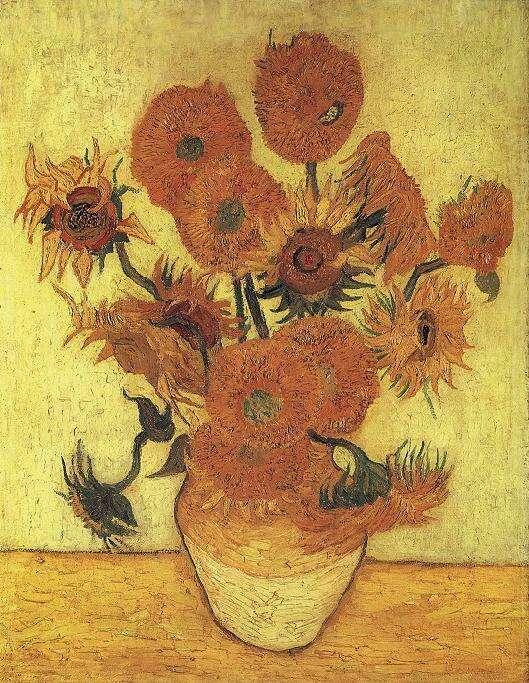
Vincent van Gogh: Sunflowers, formerly part of the Lotte and Paul Mendelssohn-Bartholdy Collection, now Sompo Museum of Art, Tokyo

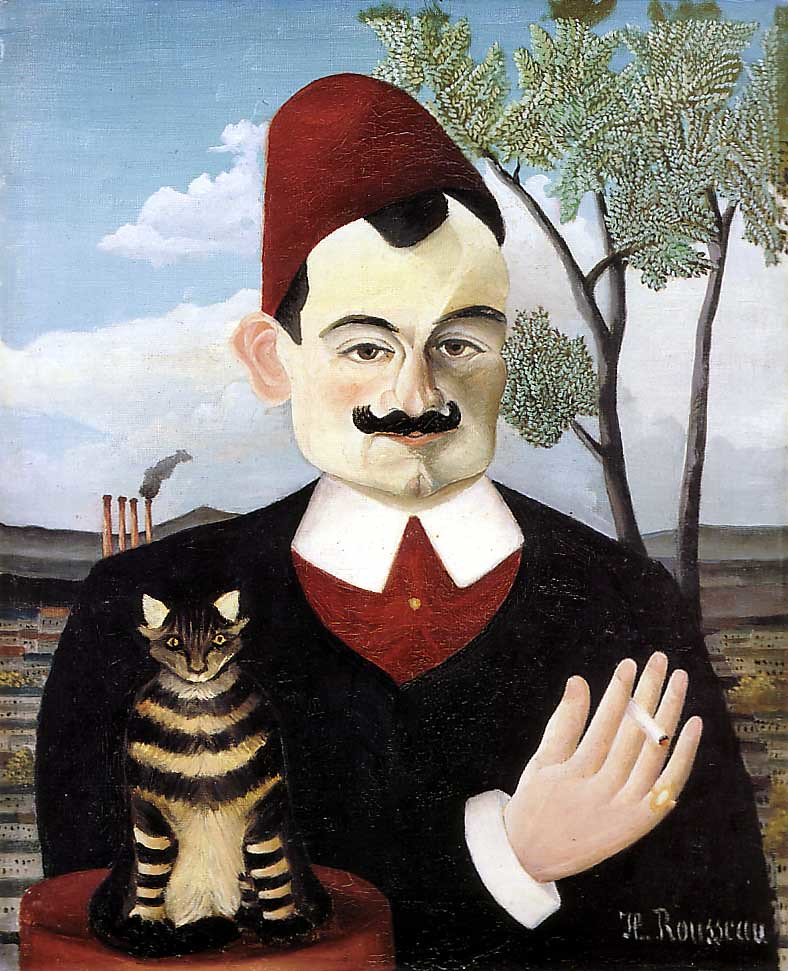
Henri Rousseau: Porträt des Herrn X (Pierre Loti), formerly in the collection of Charlotte Contesse von Wesdehlen, now in the Kunsthaus Zürich

Charlotte Reichenheim, known as Lotte, was born in Berlin in 1877. Her parents were the entrepreneur Georg Reichenheim (1842-1903) and his wife Margarete, née Eisner (1857-1935). Her mother, an important art collector, would later also be known as Margarete Oppenheim or Margarete Oppenheim-Reichenheim. Both parents came from Jewish families, but converted to Christianity on the occasion of their wedding. Her brother Hans was born in 1879. He died as a student in Munich in 1900. The family lived in Berlin's upscale Tiergarten district. Lotte Reichenheim received private lessons there as a child and also spent several years of her childhood in Silesia.

== Art collector ==
Mendelssohn-Bartholdy parents collected art, a tradition that she and her husband would continue. In 1903 her father died and left his assets, estimated at 4,700,000 marks, to his wife and half to his daughter. Her mother Margarete, an important art collector in her own right, continued to build her collection with works by French artists of Impressionism and late Impressionism, including paintings Paul Cézanne. In 1906 Margarete, also known as Margarete Oppenheim-Reichenheim, married the chemist and art collector Franz Oppenheim.

Lotte Reichenheim married the banker Paul von Mendelssohn-Bartholdy in 1902. The architect friend Bruno Paul converted Börnicke Castle near Bernau into a country residence for the couple and designed a villa for them on Berlin's Alsenstrasse. Bruno Paul also designed the interior design of the houses and the modern furniture that was manufactured by the United Workshops.

Lotte von Mendelssohn-Bartholdy worked as an editor from 1915 for the art and culture magazine Wieland, of which Bruno Paul was co-founder and editor. She acquired articles and corresponded with authors such as Richard Dehmel, Wilhelm Bode and Max J. Friedländer. Her own essays appeared under the name Lotte v. Mendelssohn Bartholdy. She also wrote for the magazine Die Dame.

Together with her husband, Paul, Lotte von Mendelssohn-Bartholdy amassed an important art collection.

Advised by Alfred Flechtheim, Bruno Paul and Wilhelm Uhde, Lotte and Paul von Mendelssohn-Bartholdy were among the first in Germany to collect pictures by the painter Henri Rousseau, Pablo Picasso, and Georges Braque before 1914, making them among the pioneers in this field. The Mendelssohn-Bartholdys were also among the early collectors of Vincent van Gogh's works in Germany, including the paintings Mrs Roulin with her Child (now the Metropolitan Museum of Art, New York City), Park in Arles (private collection), The Tree (private collection), Trees in the Garden of the Hospital Saint-Paul (Armand Hammer Museum of Art, Los Angeles), The Man with the Cornflower (private collection), The Town Hall of Auvers on July 14th (private collection) and a version from the well-known series of Sunflowers (Sompo Museum of Art, Tokyo). A self-portrait in the collection that was formerly attributed to van Gogh is now considered a forgery (E. G. Bührle Collection Foundation, Zurich). Wilhelm Uhde and Alfred Flechtheim played an important role in the acquisition of Picasso's works. The series of Picasso paintings in the collection included Inclined Woman's Head (Staatsgalerie Stuttgart), Portrait of Angel Fernández de Soto (private collection), Le Moulin de la Galette and Fernande with Black Mantilla (both Solomon R. Guggenheim Museum, New York City), Boy leading a horse (Museum of Modern Art, New York City) and Boy with a Pipe (private collection). There were also works by other artists such as Edgar Degas, Édouard Manet, Claude Monet, Pierre-Auguste Renoir, André Derain, Marie Laurencin, Maurice de Vlaminck, William Hogarth and Paul Signac.

Lotte von Mendelssohn-Bartholdy co-founder and chaired the Women's Association for the Promotion of German Fine Art, which advocated the purchase of works of art by German artists in order to pass them on to museums. She was also a member of the German Society for East Asian Art. As a patron, she donated two Egyptian leather shadow puppets to the Islamic Department in the Kaiser Friedrich Museum (now the Museum of Islamic Art) in 1912.

Lotte und Paul von Mendelssohn-Bartholdy divorced in 1927.The couple divided up their art collection and Lotte von Mendelssohn-Bartholdy received alimony, making her financially independent. In 1930 she married Georg Graf von Wesdehlen (1869–1938) from Prussian nobility. His grandfather was the diplomat Georges Frédéric Petitpierre.

== Nazi era ==
When Hitler came to power in Germany in 1933, Lotte's family and relations were persecuted by the Nazis because of their Jewish heritage. Lotte's mother, Margarete Oppenheim, died in 1935 and some of her mother's art collection was auctioned off in 1936 while others still remained in Germany. The Oppenheim property that remained in Germany was later confiscated by the German authorities.

In exile in Switzerland, her assets in Germany either confiscated or inaccessible, Charlotte Countess von Wesdehlen lived in financial difficulties. Her parents' inheritance was no longer available to her and her first husband, Paul von Mendelssohn-Bartholdy, died in 1935. After the death of her second husband, Georg Graf von Wesdehlen, in 1938, she was increasingly forced to sell works of art from her own collection. The pictures that she was able to bring to Switzerland included, for example, the paintings La femme à la corbeille by Juan Gris, a rose still life by Pierre-Auguste Renoir and works by Camille Pissarro and Alfred Sisley. Sales include Renoir's Still Life with Peaches and Plums to the entrepreneur Emil Georg Bührle (now a private collection) and Henri Rousseau's The Muse that Inspires the Poet to the Kunstmuseum Basel. Lotte sold the Rousseau via Swiss art dealer Christoph Bernoulli (1897-1987) at a knocked-down price from its estimated value of 20,000 francs to 12,000 francs, a “disgracefully cheap price,” according to museum director Georg Schmidt, who was aware of the collector's plight when purchasing it. The painting was later the subject of a restitution claim.

Lotte von Mendelssohn-Barthlody, known as the Charlotte Countess von Wesdehlen, died in Geneva in 1946.

== See also ==
- List of claims for restitution for Nazi-looted art
- The Holocaust
- GEDOK
- Aryanization

== Literature ==
- Anna-Carolin Augustin: Berliner Kunstmatronage: Sammlerinnen und Förderinnen bildender Kunst um 1900, Wallstein Verlag, Göttingen 2018, ISBN 978-3-8353-3180-8.
- Esther Tisa Francini, Anja Heuss, Georg Kreis: Fluchtgut - Raubgut : der Transfer von Kulturgütern in und über die Schweiz 1933 - 1945 und die Frage der Restitution. Herausgegeben von der Unabhängigen Expertenkommission Schweiz - Zweiter Weltkrieg, Chronos Verlag, Zürich 2001, ISBN 978-3-0340-0601-9.
- Anna-Dorothea Ludewig, Julius H. Schoeps, Indes Sonder (Hrsg.): Aufbruch in die Moderne: Sammler, Mäzene und Kunsthändler in Berlin 1880–1933. DuMont, Köln 2012, ISBN 978-3-8321-9428-4.
