= Loeb =

Loeb or Löb may refer to:

== People ==
- Loeb (surname), including a list of people surnamed Loeb or Löb
- Löb Nevakhovich (between 1776 and 1778–1831), Russian writer
- Löb Strauß, birth name of Levi Strauss (1829–1902), German-born American businessman

== Businesses ==
- Loeb (supermarket), a defunct Canadian supermarket chain
- Loeb's (department store), a specialty department store, Mississippi, United States
- Loeb, Rhoades & Co., a Wall Street brokerage firm

== Other uses ==
- Loeb Classical Library, a series of books with works of Greek and Latin authors
- Frances Lehman Loeb Art Center, an art museum in Poughkeepsie, New York, United States

== See also ==
- Lev (given name)
- Löw (disambiguation)
