= F. Kleinberger Galleries =

Defunct commercial art gallery in Paris and New York City

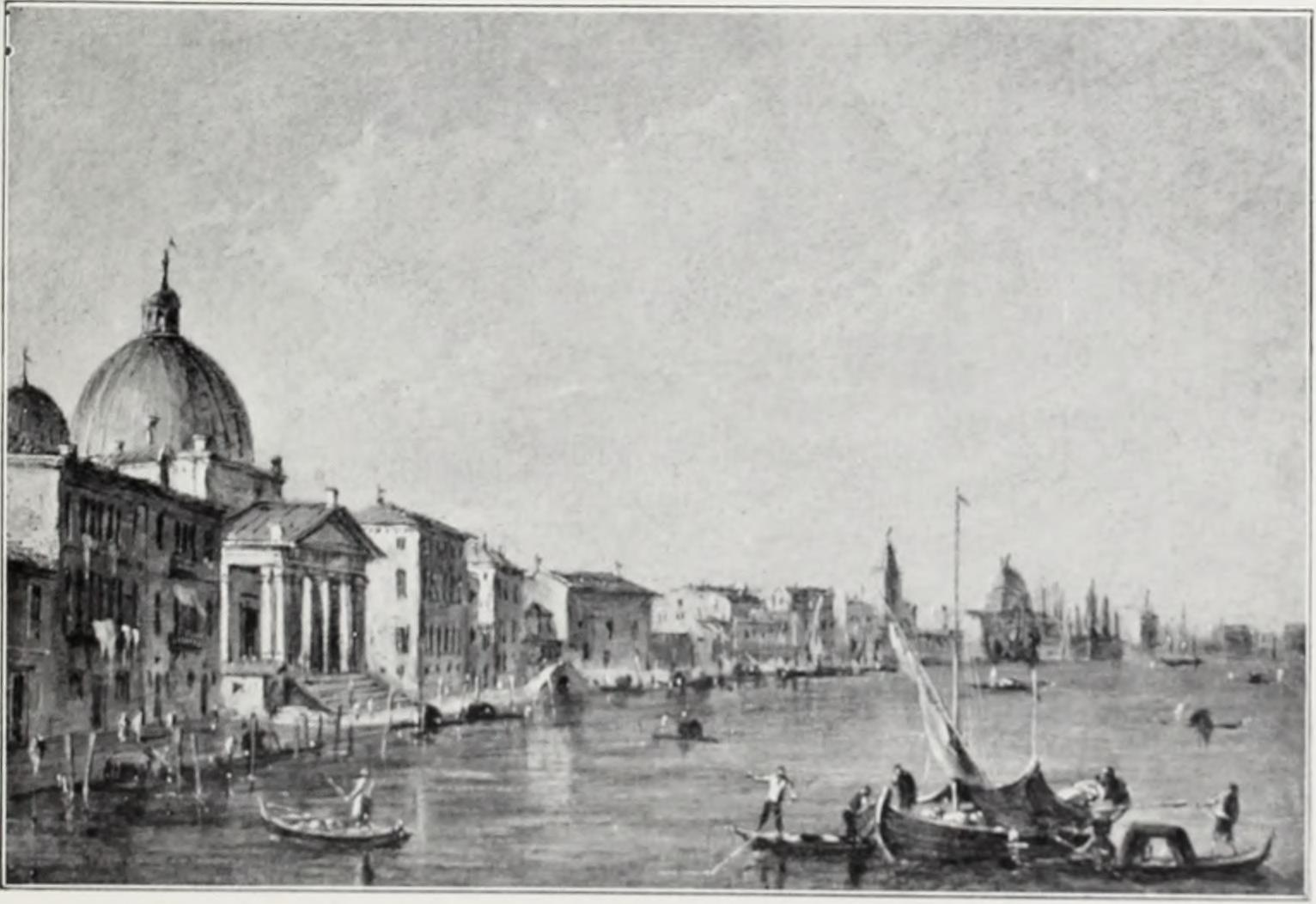
- Illustrated catalogue of 150 paintings of old masters from the Kleinberger Galeries (1911)
- Founder: Franz Kleinberger
- Dissolved: 1973
- Headquarters: Paris and New York City
- CEO: Harry Sperling

F. Kleinberger Galleries was a commercial art gallery based in Paris and New York that for more than a century played an important role in importing European artworks into the United States. Founded in 1848 by Franz Kleinberger in Paris, it was owned and managed by his grandson Harry Sperling until the art dealership closed in 1973.

== Founding and early years ==
Franz Kleinberger founded the art dealership in 1848 in Paris. Its main business was importing European paintings to the United States. By 1913, Kleinberger had a New York branch gallery on Fifth Avenue, near the Duveen Gallery where numerous exhibitions were organised. Art experts who worked for Kleinberger Galleries included John Watson.

== The Sperling years ==
Harry S. Sperling (d. 1971) was vice president of Kleinberger until 1973 when he became president following the death of the founder Franz Kleinberger (ca. 1936). Kleinberger Galleries worked in close partnership with Julius Böhler both before and after World War II. The French branch of Kleinberger was run by Alan Loebl, a cousin of Harry Sperling.

== Supplier to American museums ==
Kleinberger was a major supplier of European artworks to American museums. The Museum of Fine Arts in Boston holds a dozen artworks that passed through Kleinberger. The National Gallery of Art in Washington D.C. list twenty and the Metropolitan Museum of Art lists over 200 artworks associated with Kleinberger.
