= Lewe (surname) =

Lewe coat of arms

Lewe is a surname. It may be Löwe spelled without diacritics or literally meaning 'life' or 'lion' is some Germanic languages. In particular, it is associated with the Dutch noble Lewe family. Notable people with the surname include:

- Barbara Lewe-Pohlmann-Schüttpelz or Barbara Schüttpelz
- Detlef Lewe
- Egbert Lewe van Middelstum (1743–1822) Dutch politician
- Evert Lewe (died 1641), Dutch nobleman and statesman
- John Lewe
- Lulu Lewe (born 1992), German singer
- Sarah Marianne Corina Lewe, birth name of Sarah Connor (singer)
