= Loewe (surname) =

The German-language surname Löwe, also Lowe or Loewe (German for "lion") may refer to:

- Andreas Loewe (born 1973), Australian Anglican priest
- August Löwe (died 1893), Russian mathematician
- Carl Loewe (1796–1869), German composer, tenor singer and conductor
- Chris Löwe (born 1989), German football player
- David Loewe, German businessperson
- Edward Löwe (1794–1880), English chess master
- Elisabeth Loewe (1924–1996), German artist
- Enrique Loewe, founder of the Loewe Spanish fashion brand in 1846
- Erich Löwe (1906–1943), Oberstleutnant in the Wehrmacht during World War II
- Ferdinand Löwe (1865–1925), Austrian conductor
- Frederick Loewe (1901–1988), American composer
- Fritz Loewe (1895–1974), German meteorologist
- Gabriele Löwe (born 1958), retired East German sprinter
- Herbert Loewe (1882–1940), British scholar
- Joel Löwe (1760–1802), German Biblical commentator
- Johann Jacob Löwe (1628–1703), German baroque composer and organist
- Ludwig Loewe (1837–1886), German weapons manufacturer
- Michael Loewe (1922–2025), British sinologist
- Paul E. Loewe, Mexican scouting leader
- Siegmund Loewe, German businessman
- Sophie Löwe (1815–1866), German opera soprano
- Stewart Loewe (born 1968), Australian football player
- Wilhelm Loewe (1814–1886), German politician
- Wolfgang Löwe (born 1953), German volleyball player
- Wolfram Löwe (born 1945), German football player

== See also ==
- Lerner and Loewe, the musical partnership of lyricist Alan Jay Lerner and composer Frederick Loewe
- Loew
- Lowe (surname)
