= Mendelssohn & Co. =

Private bank based in Berlin, Germany, taken over by the Nazi regime in 1938

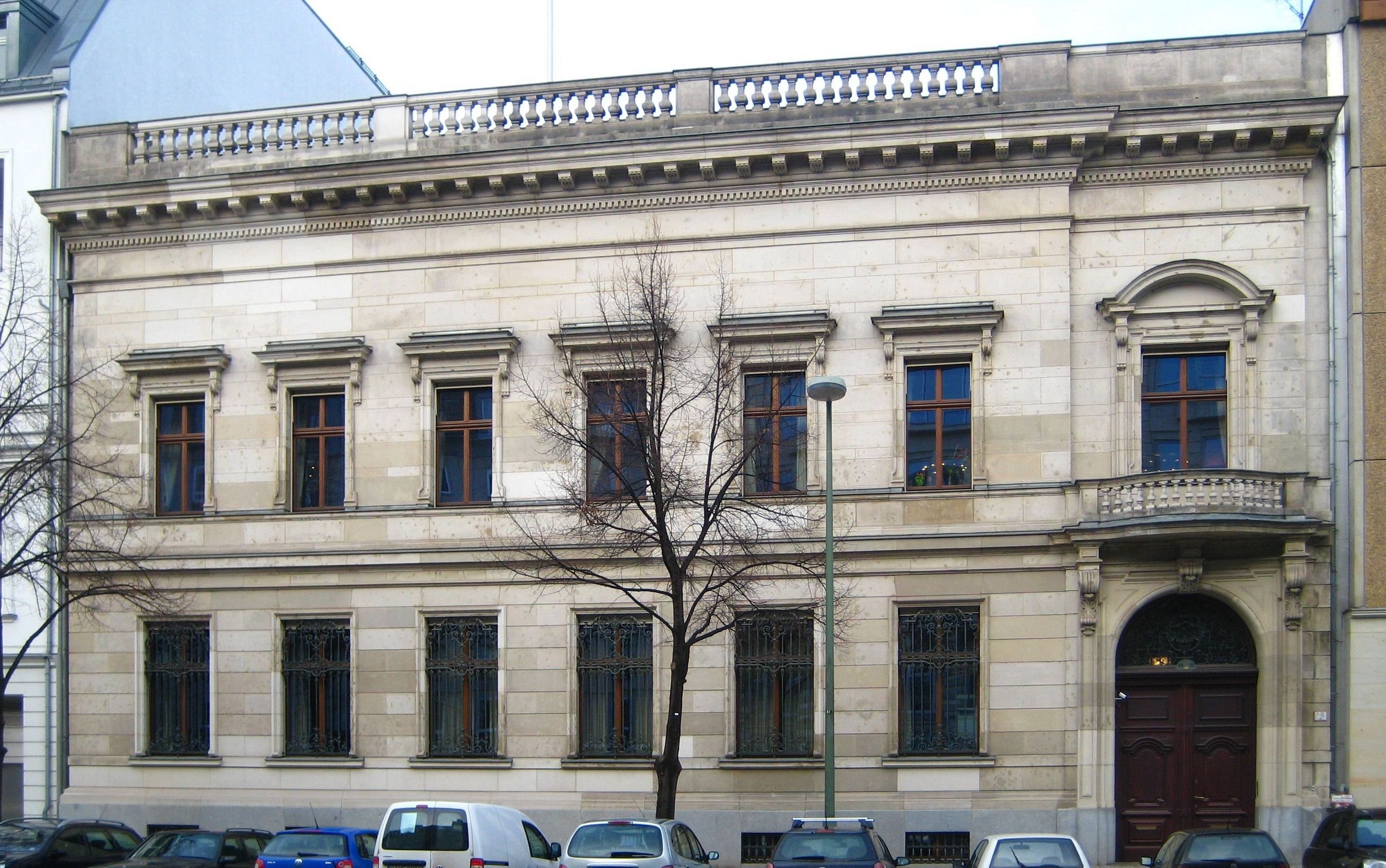
Former Bankhaus Mendelssohn & Co., Jägerstraße 49–50 near Gendarmenmarkt; built 1891–93.

Mendelssohn & Co. was a private bank based in Berlin, Prussia. One of the leading banks in the 19th and early 20th centuries, it was taken over by the Nazi regime, under the policy of "Aryanization", because the owners were Jewish.

== History ==
The bank was established in 1795 by Joseph Mendelssohn in Berlin. In 1804, his younger brother Abraham Mendelssohn Bartholdy joined the company. In 1815, they moved into their new headquarters at Jägerstraße 51, thereby laying the foundations of Berlin's financial district. Mendelssohn & Co. remained in that building until its divestiture in 1939.

Mendelssohn quickly rose to prominence among European banks. Starting in the 1850s, they acted as Royal bankers for the Russian Tsar and, from the 1870s, dominating the Central European financial market for Russian sovereign bonds and railway bonds. Only the outbreak of World War I in 1914 and the Lenin putsch in 1917 put an end to these close contacts. The Mendelssohn family, through the descendants of the founding brothers, continued to run the company.

Mendelssohn & Co. survived the financial meltdown of the 1930s comparatively well. Following the death of Franz von Mendelssohn and Paul von Mendelssohn-Bartholdy in 1935, Rudolf Löb was appointed as chairman of the bank, the first non-family member to be chairman.

== Aryanization and destruction by the Nazis ==
Persecuted by the Nazis in 1938, Mendelssohn & Co was Aryanized, which was the word used to describe the Nazi policy of transferring assets owned by Jews to "Aryans". Mendelssohn & Co. were forced to hand over their assets to Deutsche Bank and shut down.

Possessions of members of the Mendelssohn family were plundered, and they were forced into exile, where several committed suicide.

== Notable employees ==
- Rudolf Löb
- Fritz Mannheimer
- Paul von Mendelssohn-Bartholdy

== See also ==
- S. Bleichröder
- M. A. Rothschild & Söhne
- List of banks in Germany
