= Harry Sperling =

Art dealer, president of F. Kleinberger & Co

- Born: 1906
- Died: 1971
- Other name: Harry G. Sperling
- Occupation: art dealer
- Known for: art dealing, philanthropy and Radio Free Europe

Harry Sperling (1906–1971) was an OSS officer, an art dealer, a smuggler and the European Director of Information at Radio Free Europe, as well as a philanthropist. Born into an art dealing dynasty, he owned and directed the Kleinberger Galleries.

== Early life and education ==
Harry G. Spering was born in the art dealing dynasty associated with the F. Kleinberger Galleries Inc. He graduated Columbia College in 1927. His father Emil M. Sperling, died in 1930, and Harry became the President and owner.

== Art dealer ==
Harry Sperling was the director of F. Kleinberger Galleries in New York. His cousin, Allen Loebl directed a branch of the gallery in France and was involved in dealing in Nazi looted art.

== The OSS and WWII ==
Sperling was recruited into the OSS during World War II, and alternating intelligence work with art dealing.

== Radio Free Europe ==
During the Cold War, Sperling became the European Director of Information at Radio Free Europe in Munich.

== Smuggler for museums and claims for looted art ==
In his memoir, Artful Tom, the former director of the Metropolitan Museum of Art Thomas Hoving praised Harry Sperling as one of his "favorite dealer-smugglers" recounting how Sperling got some 12th century heads out of France for him

A drawing that Sperling donated to the Metropolitan Museum of Art turned out to have been looted from the Jewish art collector Dr. Arthur Feldmann, who had been robbed and tortured by the Nazis and whose wife, Gisela, was murdered at Auschwitz.
