= Cécile Mendelssohn =

Artist, wife of Felix Mendelssohn (1817–1853)

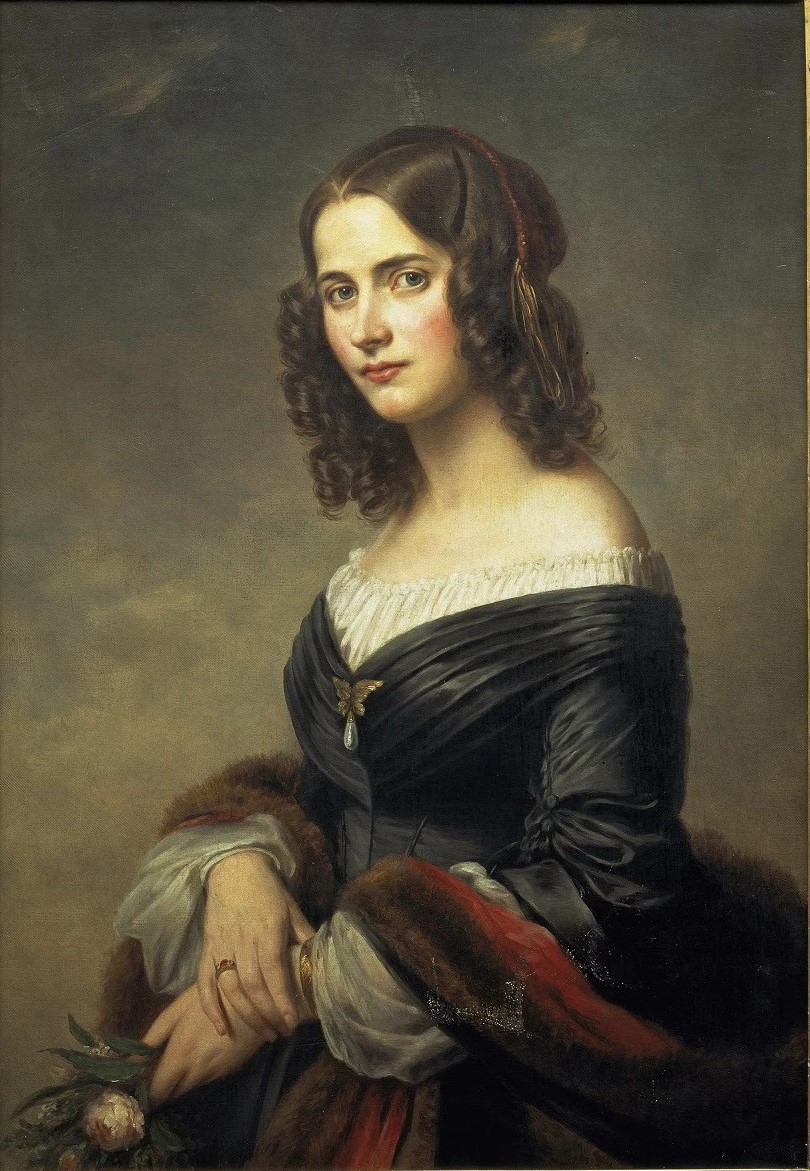
- Cécile Mendelssohn in 1846
- Born: Cécile Charlotte Sophie Jeanrenaud; 10 October 1817
- Died: 25 September 1853 (aged 35); Frankfurt
- Spouse(s): Felix Mendelssohn, m. 1837
- Children: 5, including Paul Mendelssohn Bartholdy

Cécile Charlotte Sophie Mendelssohn Bartholdy (née Jeanrenaud, 1817–1853) was a German amateur artist and singer of French descent. As the wife of composer Felix Mendelssohn, she is often seen as a positive influence on his life and work and is the dedicatee of music by both Felix and his sister Fanny Mendelssohn.

== Life ==
=== Early life ===
Cécile Charlotte Sophie Jeanrenaud was born on 10 October 1817, the youngest daughter of the Reformed pastor Auguste Jenrenaud and his wife Elizabeth (née Souchay). Both parents came from Huguenot families which had left France in 1685 to continue practicing their Protestant faith. Her father, who came from a humble family in Switzerland, died when she was two. Cécile and her three siblings grew up in a prosperous, well-connected and well-educated home with her mother and maternal grandparents in Frankfurt.

=== Courtship and marriage ===
On 4 May 1836, Cécile performed as a soprano in a concert of the Frankfurt Cecilian choir conducted by Felix Mendelssohn, who was filling in for a friend who was ill. Mendelssohn was introduced to Cécile and her mother by his aunt. He left Frankfurt two days after meeting Cécile to conduct the premiere of his oratorio Paulus in Düsseldorf, and then travelled to Schevenigen by himself to test whether his interest in her would continue. By 7 June, he had returned to Frankfurt to see her again. He wrote 'Duett ohne Worte' Op. 38, No. 6 while she was on a two-week holiday that month.

Mendelssohn proposed to Cécile on 9 September on a forest picnic, and Cécile seems to have accepted immediately. During their engagement, Mendelssohn’s sister, the composer Fanny Mendelssohn, made an album for Cécile including Suleika, which Fanny composed for her as a Christmas gift. Fanny later dedicated Op. 1 of her Bote and Bock to Cécile in 1846.

Despite Cécile's family’s reservations that she could have got a better match, she married Felix Mendelssohn at the Walloon French Reformed Church in Frankfurt on 28 March 1837 with a bridal chorus composed by Ferdinand Hiller, a long-term family friend. They kept an illustrated diary of their month-long honeymoon. During their honeymoon, Mendelssohn composed his Op. 40 as a wedding gift for her.

=== Family life ===
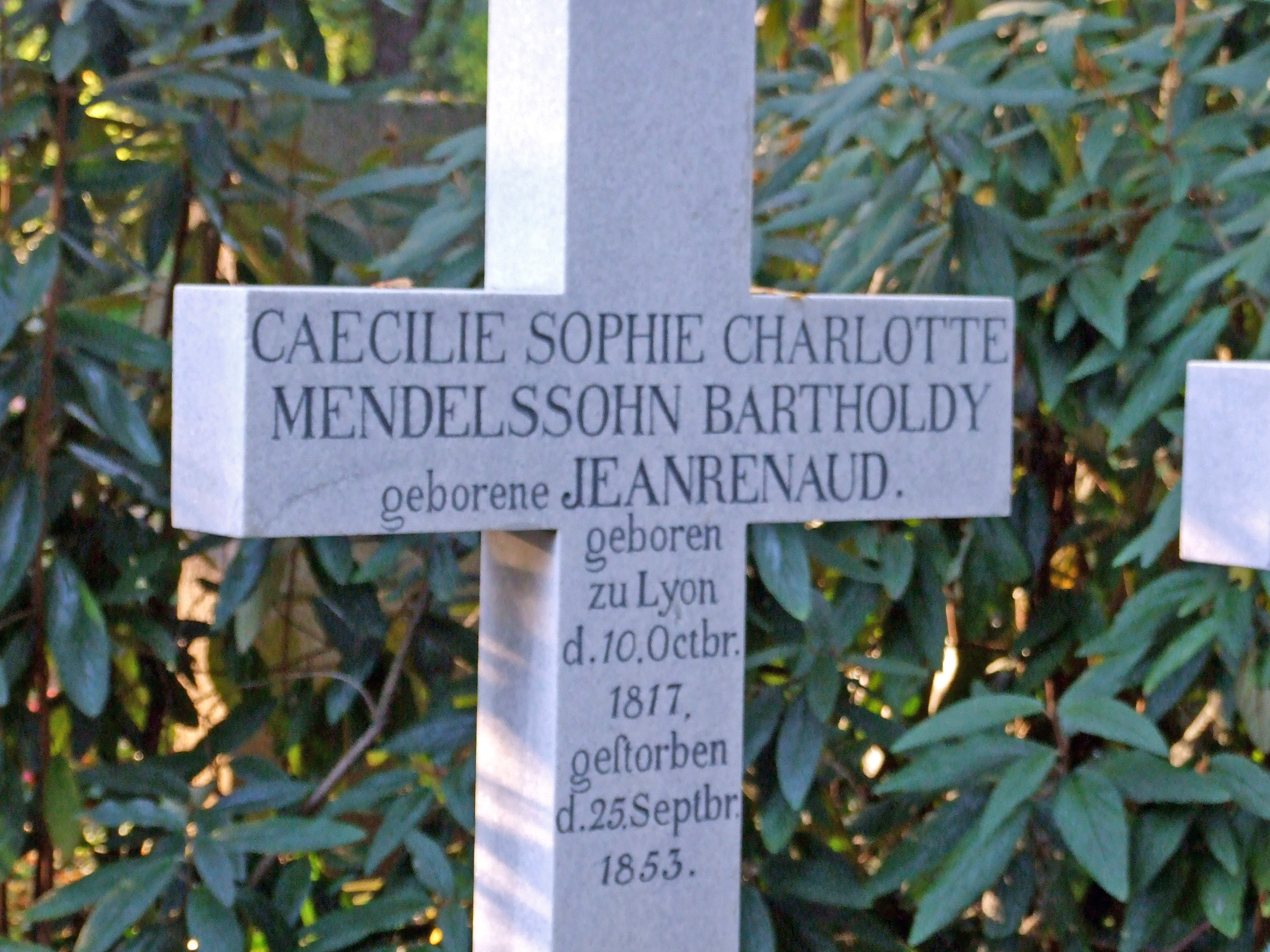
Cécile's grave in the Mendelssohn family plot in Frankfurt Main Cemetery

The Mendelssohns settled in Leipzig, with the first of their five children being born in February 1838. She learned English in order to travel to Britain with her husband, which she was able to do in 1842, but at other times she was prevented from travelling by her pregnancies. She continued to travel within Germany, including taking her sickly youngest son, Felix, to the spa town of Bad Soden.

Their children were:

- Karl (b. 1838), a historian
- Marie (b. 1839)
- Paul (b. 1841), a chemist
- Felix (b. 1843, d. 1850)
- Elisabeth 'Lili' (b. 1845), who married academic Adolf Wach.

Cécile died of tuberculosis on 25 September 1853 at her mother's house in Frankfurt. Her mother raised her two daughters, while the two surviving boys were raised by their uncle, Paul Mendelssohn.

== Art ==
Cécile was noted as a talented artist in pencils, watercolours and oils. During the couples’ courtship, they painted portraits of each other, and in the early months of their marriage, she received training from landscape artist Anton Radl. The painter Eduard Magnus requested some of her flower drawings. Her paintings were displayed at home or given as gifts, often in the form of album bindings or decorations for visiting card holders. One of her oil paintings, a landscape of Ticino, is in public ownership.

== Character and legacy ==
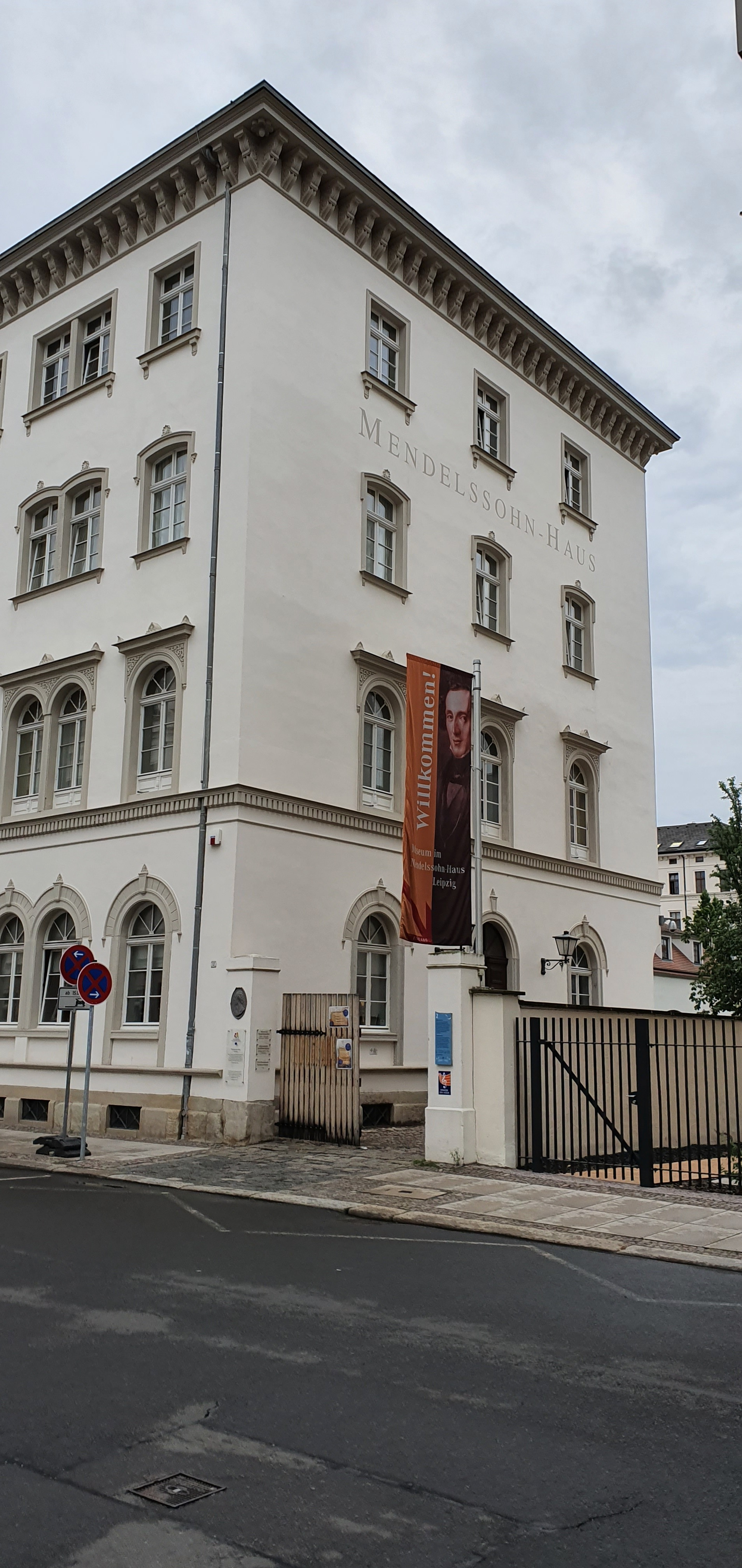
Mendelssohn House, Leipzig, where the family lived in 1845–1847, which is now a museum

Cécile was often noted by her contemporaries as being quiet, gentle and calm, and producing a stable domestic environment for her husband. Mendelssohn himself wrote that he found in her 'a contentment that he had not known since childhood' and that 'the best part of every pleasure is gone if Cécile is not there', and his letters became filled with details of their family life.

According to their contemporary, Ignaz Moscheles, 'His wife [Cécile] is very charming, very unassuming, and childlike...Her way of speaking is pleasing and simple; her German is Frankforty, therefore not pure...' Moscheles' wife said of her, 'One must congratulate the excitable effervescent Mendelssohn: he has met with a wife so gentle, so exquisitely feminine, they are perfectly matched.' Fanny Mendelssohn was disappointed that Felix's relationship with Cécile made her less close with her brother than before, but when they eventually met, said, 'Cécile possessed a wonderfully soothing temperament, that calmed her husband’s whims and promised to cure him of his irritability'.

It has been noted that biographers of Felix Mendelssohn have sometimes given limited or misrepresentative treatment to Cécile, especially given that she destroyed many of Felix's letters which could have given information about her life.

In 1947, some of Cécile's letters and diaries were published in The Romance of the Mendelssohns by Jacques Petitpierre. The Mendelssohns' honeymoon diary was published, along with some of their letters, in 1997.
