= Elisabeth Loewe =

German painter

Elisabeth Loewe (1924, in Breslau – 1996, in Bremen) was a German artist of the Post- Expressionism.

== Life ==
Born in Breslau to Jewish parents, she contracted Poliomyelitis as a nine-year-old, which resulted in a severe physical disability. It was still possible for her parents to leave Breslau in 1939 for Chile, where the family found a fresh beginning. The German reparation policy (Federal Law of Compensation for victims of national-socialist persecution) granted Elisabeth Loewe a scholarship at the Ruprecht-Karls-University in Heidelberg, where she studied Psychology from 1958.

A Psychoanalysis showed her the path to painting. In 1961 she commenced art studies at the University for Arts in Berlin, with Professors Ernst Schumacher (painter), Peter Jansen, Hans Jaenisch and Rudolf Bednarzcik.

From 1970 she lived in Bremen as a freelance painter.

Her narrative art tries to find a stylistic connection of Latin American folk art and a form of expression in Jewish art of Eastern Europe. She finds her themes mainly in Russian fairy tales and in the Jewish mythology.

== Exhibitions ==
1964 Haus am Lützowplatz, Berlin 1965 Rathaus Schöneberg, Berlin 1965 Galerie Hamburg 13 1966 Galerie Neupert Zürich 1967 Galerie Hamburg 13 1969 Galerie Vallombreuse, Biarritz 1970 Galerie Mouffe, Paris 1971 Paula Modersohn-Becker Museum, Bremen 1973 Deutsch-Ibero-Amerikanische Gesellschaft, Frankfurt am Main 1975 Kunsthalle Bremen 1983 Neue Worpsweder Galerie Worpswede 1986 and 1987 Galerie Steinbrecher, Bremen 1990 Haus der Bürgerschaft 1995 KulturAmbulanz Galerie im Park, Bremen 1996 Kunstverein Langenhagen 1997 Galerie Steinbrecher und Kunstverein Achim with Dagmar Calais 1998 Kunsthaus Knapstein and townhall Sundern

== Awards ==
1970 Diplôme d'Honneur Salon International Automne Biarritz.

== Sources ==
Christoph Meckel, Die Malerin Elisabeth Loewe, in „Die Waage“ Bd. 11, 1972
