= August Löwe =

August Augustovich Löwe (Russian: Август Августович Леве; died 1893) was a Russian mathematician and author of mathematical works. Of his books the best known are Obscheponyatnaya Teoriya Perspectivy (1858), Obscheponyatnaya Prakticheskaya Geometriya (2nd ed. 1860), Nizshaya Geodesiya (2nd ed. 1861), Prakticheskaya-Arifmetika Dlya Dyevitz (1862), Kurs Arifmetiki i Sobraniye Arifmeticheskikh Zadach (2nd ed. 1871), Nachalnyya Osnovaniya Geometrii (2nd ed. 1871), and Arifmetika Dlya Nachalnykh Narodnykh Uchilishch (1872).
