= Margarete Oppenheim =

German Jewish art collector (1857–1935)

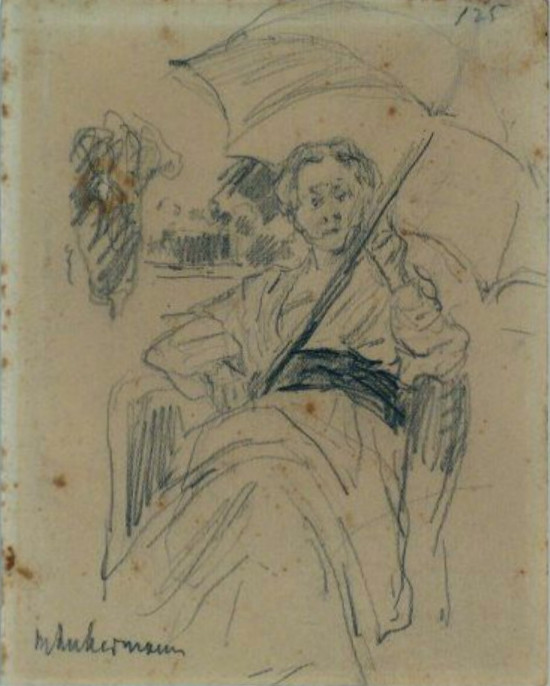
Max Liebermann: Portrait of Mrs. Margarete Oppenheim, drawing, 1917, Stedelijk Museum Amsterdam

Margarete Oppenheim (born Margarete Eisner, October 10, 1857, in Leipzig – September 2, 1935, in Berlin) was a German art collector and patron. She was among the earliest and most prolific collectors of modern art in Germany. She is also known as Margarete Oppenheim-Reichenheim.

== Early life ==
Margarete Eisner was born in Leipzig into a Jewish family in 1857, the daughter of Isidor Isaak Eisner and his wife Alwine (Lea), née Schlesinger. She was the second youngest of six children. Her father was a co-founder of the Leipzig company Callmann & Eisner, which traded in German and English manufactured goods. The family moved to Berlin in 1876.

== First marriage and children ==
In the same year, Margarete Eisner married Georg Reichenheim, a chemist with a doctorate, whose family owned textile factories in Silesia. Margarete Reichenheim converted from Judaism to Christianity around the time of their wedding. The couple moved into an apartment at Viktoriastraße No. 26 in Berlin's upscale Tiergarten district. In 1877 their daughter Charlotte (Lotte) was born, and in 1879 their son Hans was born. The son died in 1900 as a student in Munich. In 1902 the daughter married the banker Paul von Mendelssohn-Bartholdy, from whom she divorced in 1927. She then married Georg Graf von Wesdehlen. The family circle also included the entrepreneur, art collector and patron James Simon, who had married Georg Reichenheim's sister Agnes in 1878.

Georg Reichenheim collected art. After his death in 1903, Margarete Reichenheim continued to add to the collection, including many modern paintings before it was fashionable. Historian Felix Gilbert noted in this regard that "they thought she was crazy in the family" to buy "so many of these awful modern paintings."

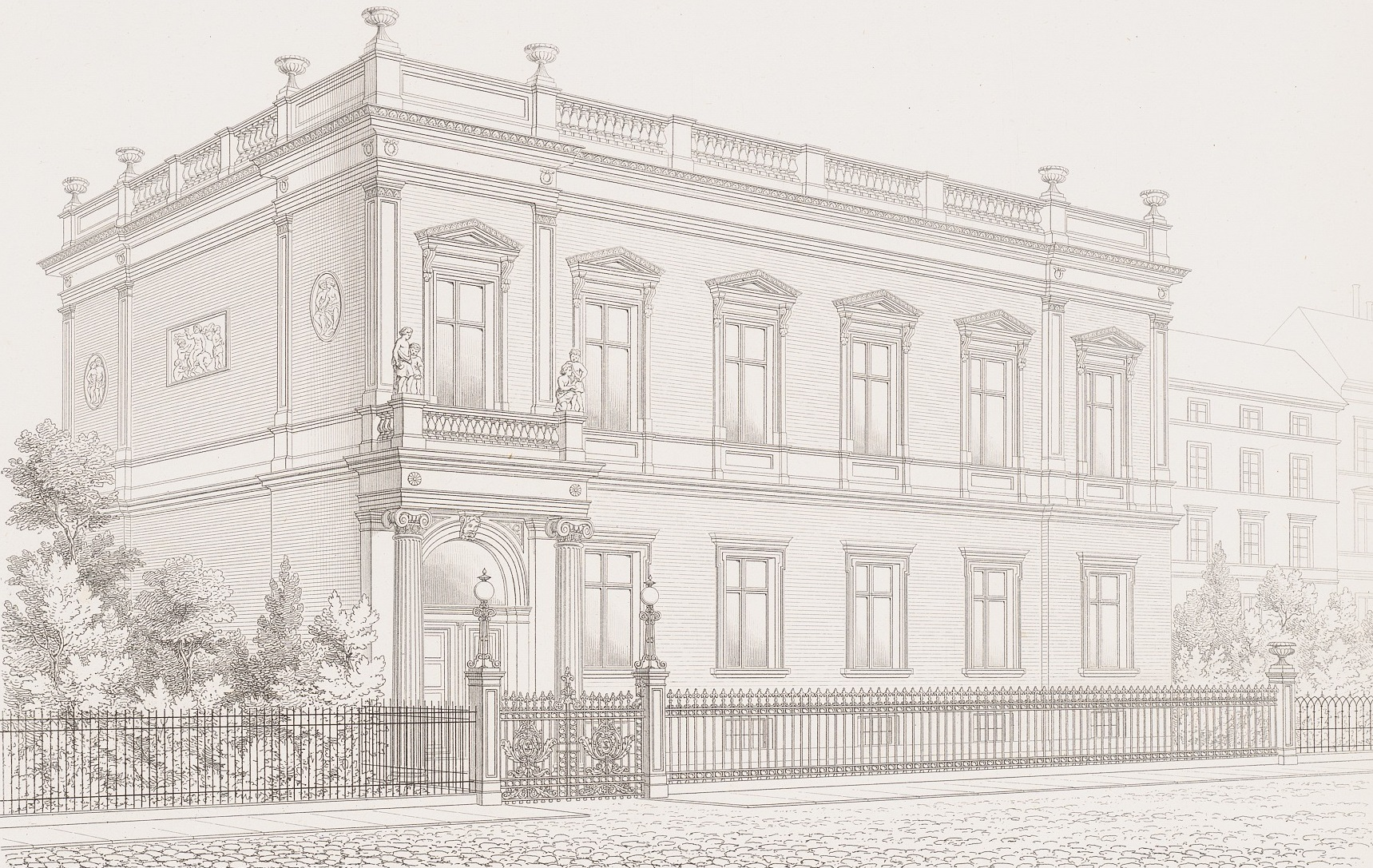
Wohnhaus Viktoriastr. 26 im Berliner Tiergarten

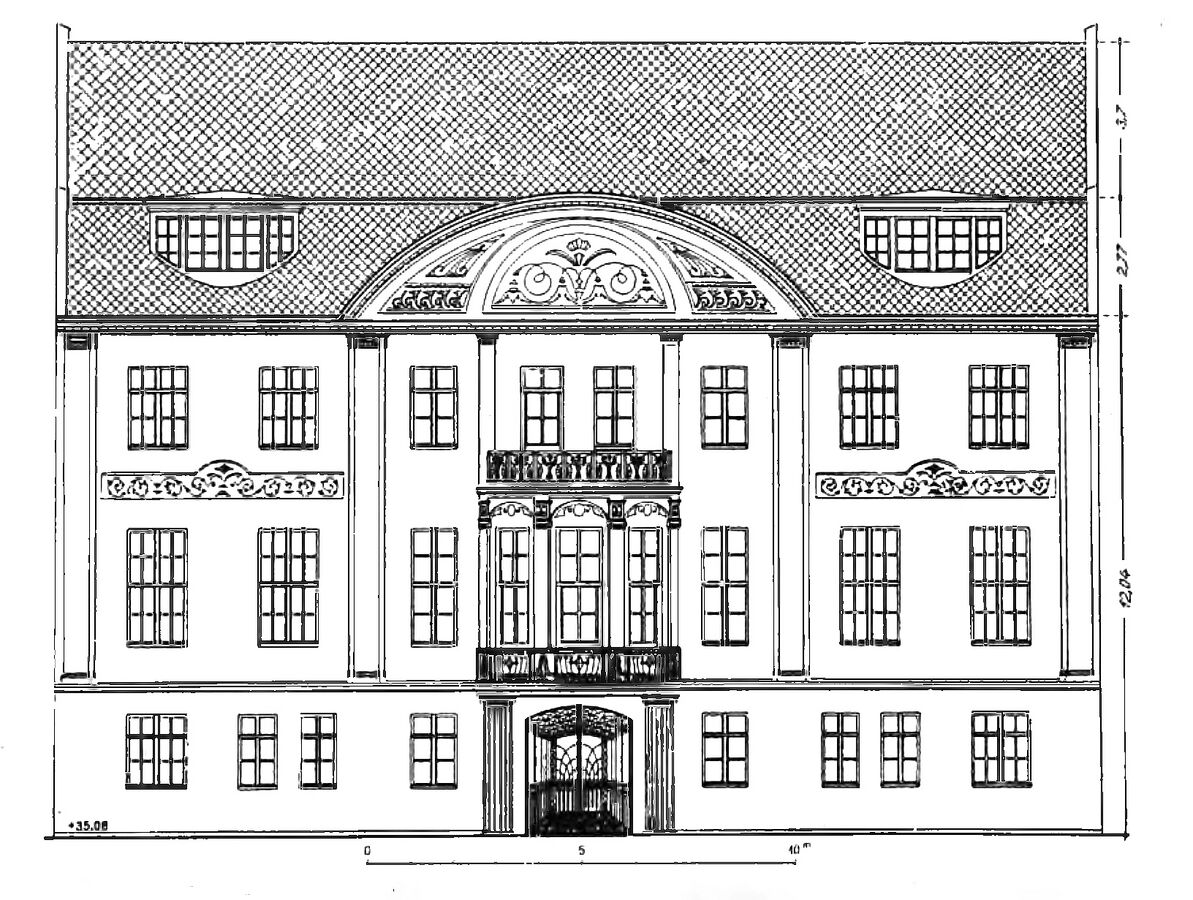
Wohnhaus Corneliusstr. 7 im Berliner Tiergarten

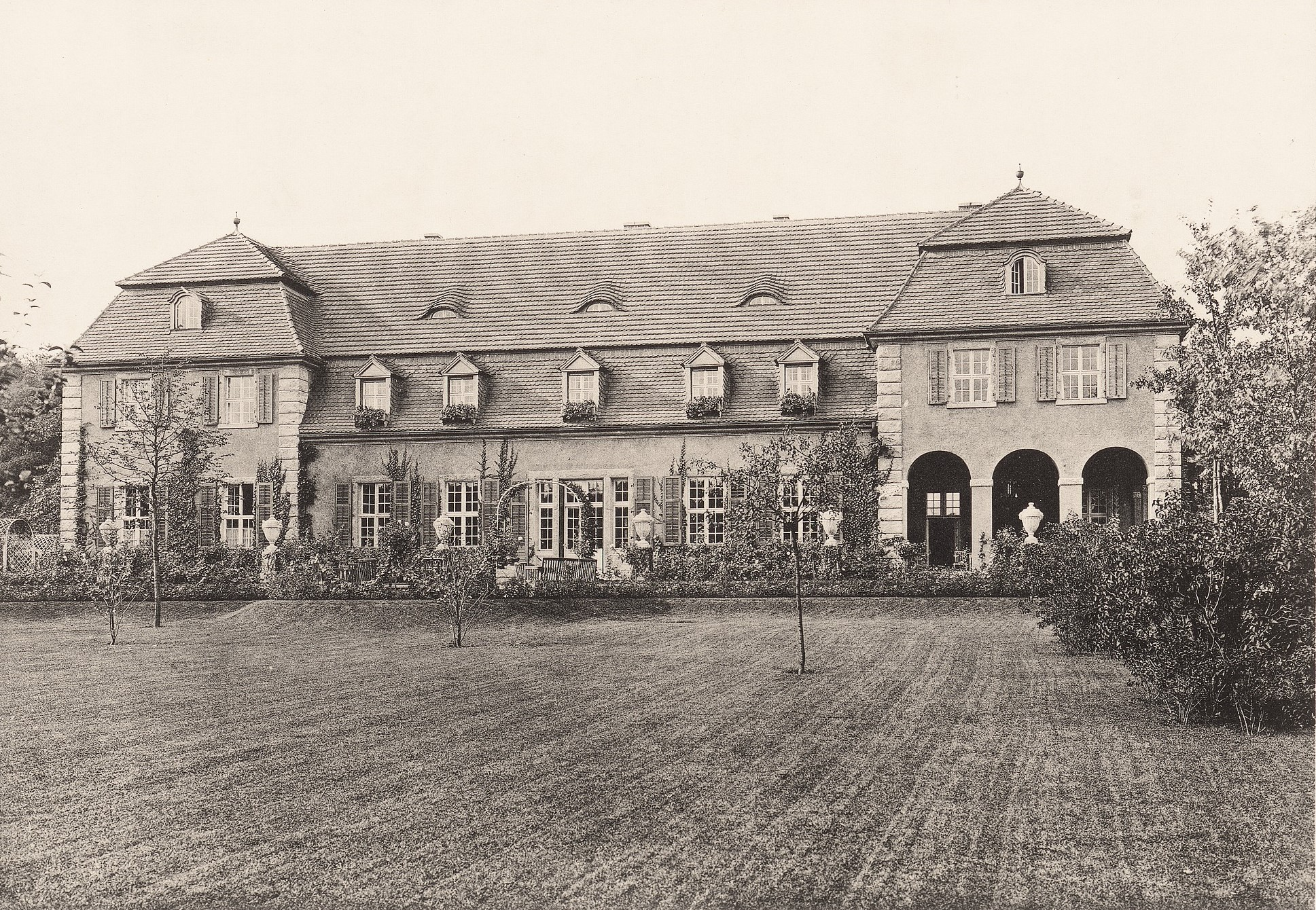
Landhaus Oppenheim, Ansicht von 1912

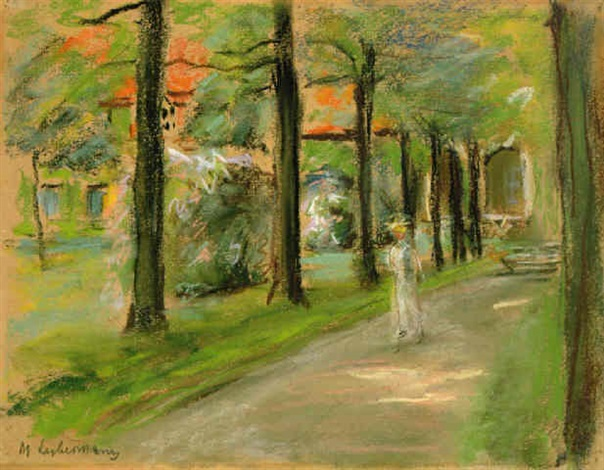
Max Liebermann: Der Garten der Villa Oppenheim, Pastell, 1925

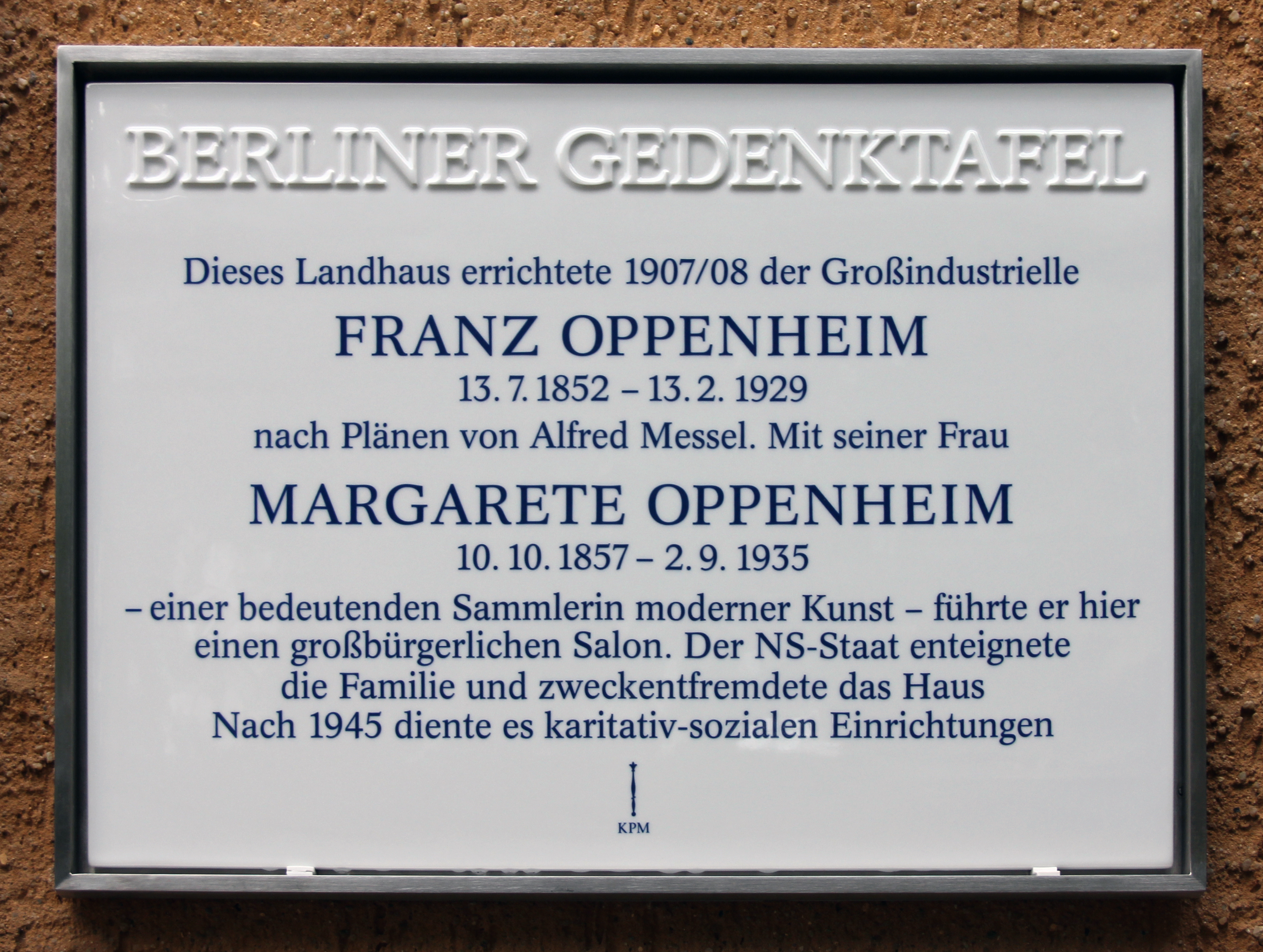
Gedenktafel für Franz und Margarete Oppenheim am ehemaligen Wohnhaus in Berlin-Wannsee

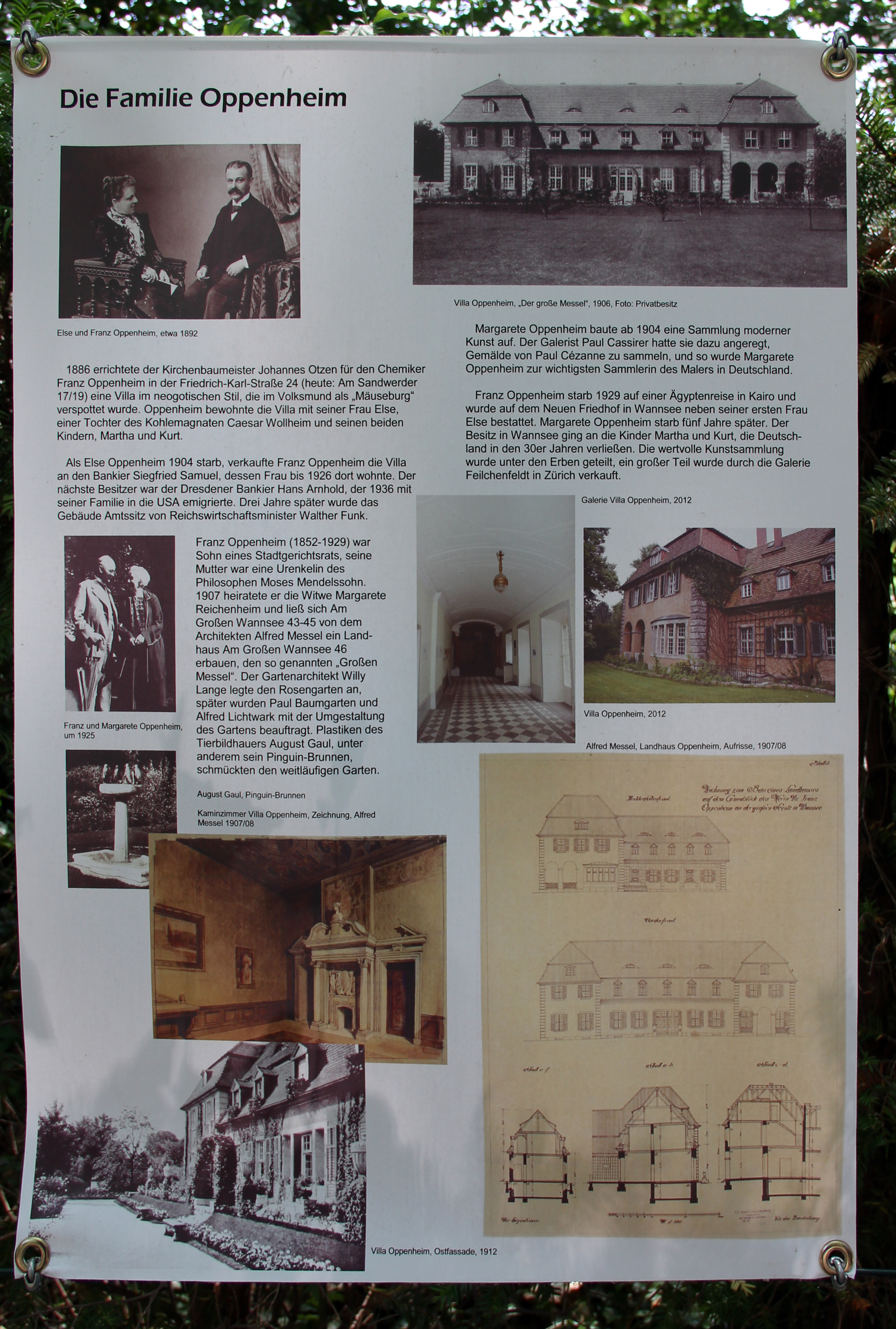
Gedenktafel Die Familie Oppenheim

== Second marriage ==
In 1906 Margarete Reichenheim remarried, with chemist Franz Oppenheim, who worked as general manager for the Agfa company. Franz Oppenheim was also widowed; his two children, already grown up, were the chemist Kurt Oppenheim and Martha Oppenheim, who was married to the entrepreneur and later diplomat Ernst von Simson. After the wedding, Franz Oppenheim moved - unusually for the time - into his wife's apartment on Viktoriastrasse. In 1913, Franz Oppenheim acquired the property at Corneliusstrasse No. 7, also located in the Tiergarten district, as a joint city residence.

The town house built there according to plans by the architect Hugo Wach was designed to meet the needs of the collector Margarete Oppenheim with gallery space and special wall display cases. In addition, the couple had a summer residence built in the Alsen villa colony in Berlin-Wannsee. For this purpose, three contiguous plots of land were purchased, on which the Oppenheim country house was built according to plans by the architect Alfred Messel. The villa had its own gallery wing for Margarete Oppenheim's collection. Even though Franz Oppenheim supported his wife in building up the art collection, he made it clear in a letter to Wilhelm Bode what division of responsibilities he saw in the Oppenheim household: "I am responsible for the management of the factory, the art department is under my wife.“ A fountain with penguin figures by the sculptor August Gaul was installed in the extensive garden of the country house. The garden architect Willy Lange laid out a rose garden for the rose grower Margarete Oppenheim. Among the neighbors at Wannsee was the painter Max Liebermann, a friend, who portrayed Margarete Oppenheim in various drawings in 1917 and painted various views of the garden. Another neighbor at Wannsee was the surgeon Ferdinand Sauerbruch.

Franz Oppenheim went with Margarete on a study trip to Egypt in 1929 where he died.

== Philanthropy ==
Starting in 1906, Margarete Oppenheim was a member of the Kaiser Friedrich Museumsverein, the sponsoring association of the museum headed by Wilhelm von Bode (today the Bodemuseum). In 1905 she donated the sculpture Hercules with the Lion to the department of Christian sculptures in the Kaiser Friedrich Museum and in 1913 a bust of King Henry IV of France. After World War I, the Berlin Museum of Decorative Arts received three pieces from her collection. She gave further objects to the Museum of Decorative Arts as a permanent loan for exhibition in the Berlin Palace. Together with the banker Robert von Mendelssohn, she donated the painting The Garden Bench by Max Liebermann to the National Gallery in 1917 on the occasion of the artist's 70th birthday. Oppenheim, also owned a large collection of Chinese arts and crafts and was a member of the German Society for East Asian Art.

== Nazi era ==
When the Nazis came to power in Germany in 1933, the Oppenheim family was persecuted because of their Jewish heritage. Margarete resigned all honorary memberships and died in Berlin in 1935. The Villa Oppenheim, Am Grossen Wannsee 43-45, which had been inherited by the two children of Franz from his first marriage to Elsbeth Wollheim, Kurt and Martha, was seized by the Nazi Sicherheitsdienst in 1937 and by the Gestapo in 1942. Her art collection was auctioned in the spring of 1936 at the Munich art dealer Julius Böhler, with unsold lots sold at end of 1936 at the Munich auction house Adolf Weinmüller.

Charlotte and Franz Oppenheim's two children emigrated to Switzerland. Hitler's Third Reich declared part of the collection a valuable cultural asset, and outlawed its exportation. The Oppenheim property that remained in Germany was later confiscated by the German authorities, and the villa on Wannsee served for a time as the Wannsee Institute of the Reich Security Main Office.

In 2016, a commemorative plaque in memory of Franz and Margarete Oppenheim was affixed to their former residence, Zum Heckeshorn No. 38 in Berlin.

== Art Collection ==
=== Decorative arts and sculptures ===
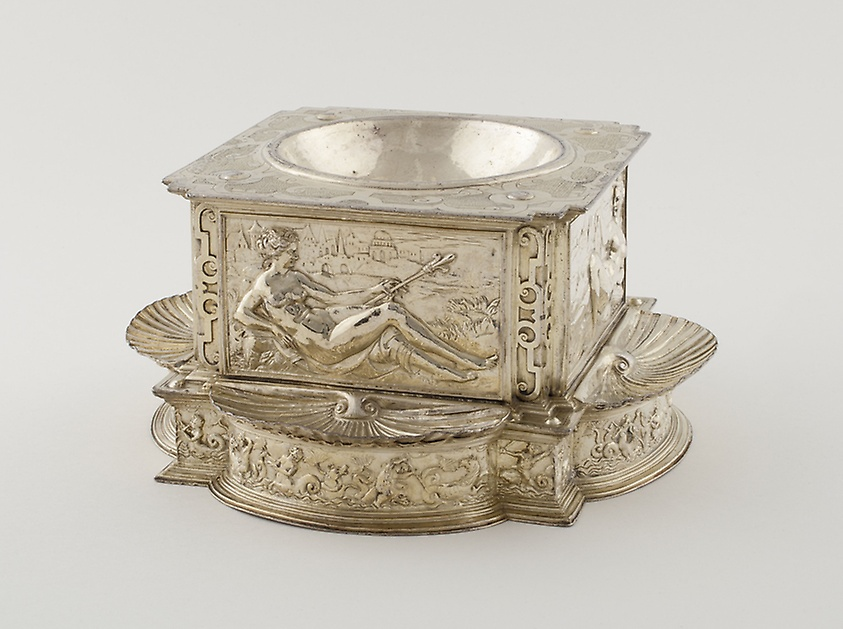
Silbernes Salzgefäß, Niederlande 1575–1600

The catalog for the 1936 auction was prepared by art historians from the Berlin Schlossmuseum, where the most valuable sculptures and art objects had been on loan for 15 years. The collection included small wood and ivory sculptures, among them an icon of the Virgin Mary in the style of Tilman Riemenschneider. In addition, there were bronze statuettes dating back to Roman and ancient Egyptian times, Venetian Renaissance bronzes and northern Italian inkwells, French Baroque clocks and chandeliers. The silver collection, mainly from Germany, consisted of Renaissance and Baroque goblets and lidded tankards. Other items in the collection were flasks, pin boxes, cane handles, signet rings, fans, plaques and medals, keys, glassware and eating utensils, embroidered textiles and lace, European porcelain manufactured in Meissen, Ludwigsburg and Berlin, and Chinese handicrafts. Most of the pieces are no longer traceable and may be in private collections.

=== Paintings and works on paper ===
While the 1936 catalog hardly mentions the collection of paintings and works on paper, it is considered important today due to its financial worth and the fact that Oppenheim was a pioneer collector of modern art. Her extensive Cézanne collection has remained unsurpassed in Germany to the present day. In addition, she was one of the first German collectors of the works of Vincent van Gogh.

Two art historians, Anna-Carolin Augustin and Sebastian Panwitz, studied Margarete Oppenheim's collection. Their findings are as follows: El Greco's older art included a depiction of the Madonna and an Annunciation (whereabouts unknown). In addition, there were two paintings of concerts in Doge's Palace in Venine and a painting of Piazza San Marco by Francesco Guardi (whereabouts unknown). 19th century French painting included three works by Édouard Manet. In addition to the painting Young Woman in the Garden (private collection), Oppenheim owned the pastel painting Portrait of Countess Albazzi (Solomon R. Guggenheim Museum, New York City) and the watercolor Berthe Morisot à l'Eventail (Art Institute of Chicago). By Edgar Degas, the collection included A Woman Places a Vase of Flowers on the Table/Woman Arranging Flowers (whereabouts unknown). Works by Vincent van Gogh included an unspecified boy's head (whereabouts unknown) and the paintings On the Banks of the Oise at Auvers (Detroit Institute of Arts), White Roses (Metropolitan Museum of Art, New York City), and Angle in the Park of the St. Paul Asylum (whereabouts unknown).

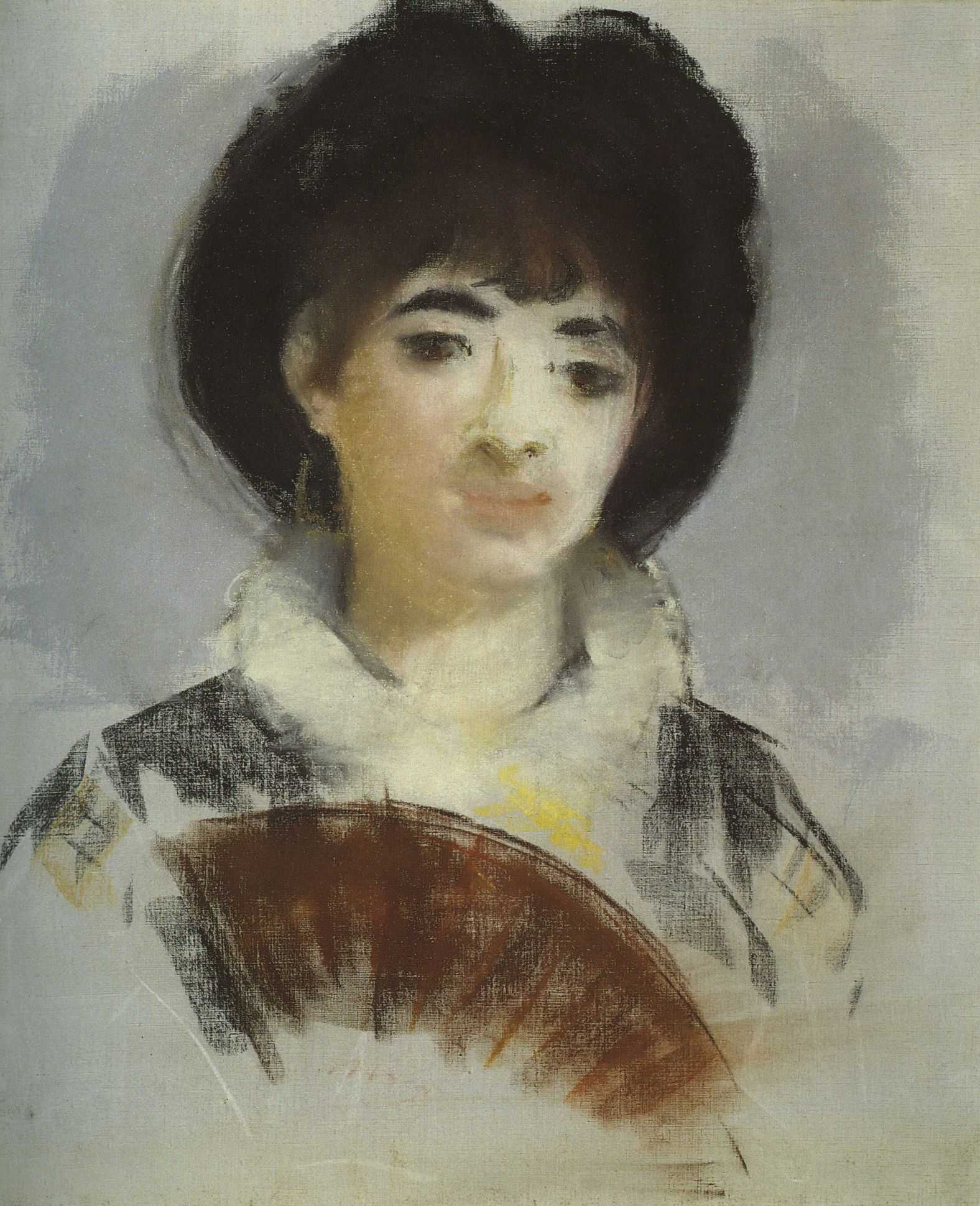
Édouard Manet:
Bildnis der Gräfin Iza Albazzi
Solomon R. Guggenheim Museum, New York City

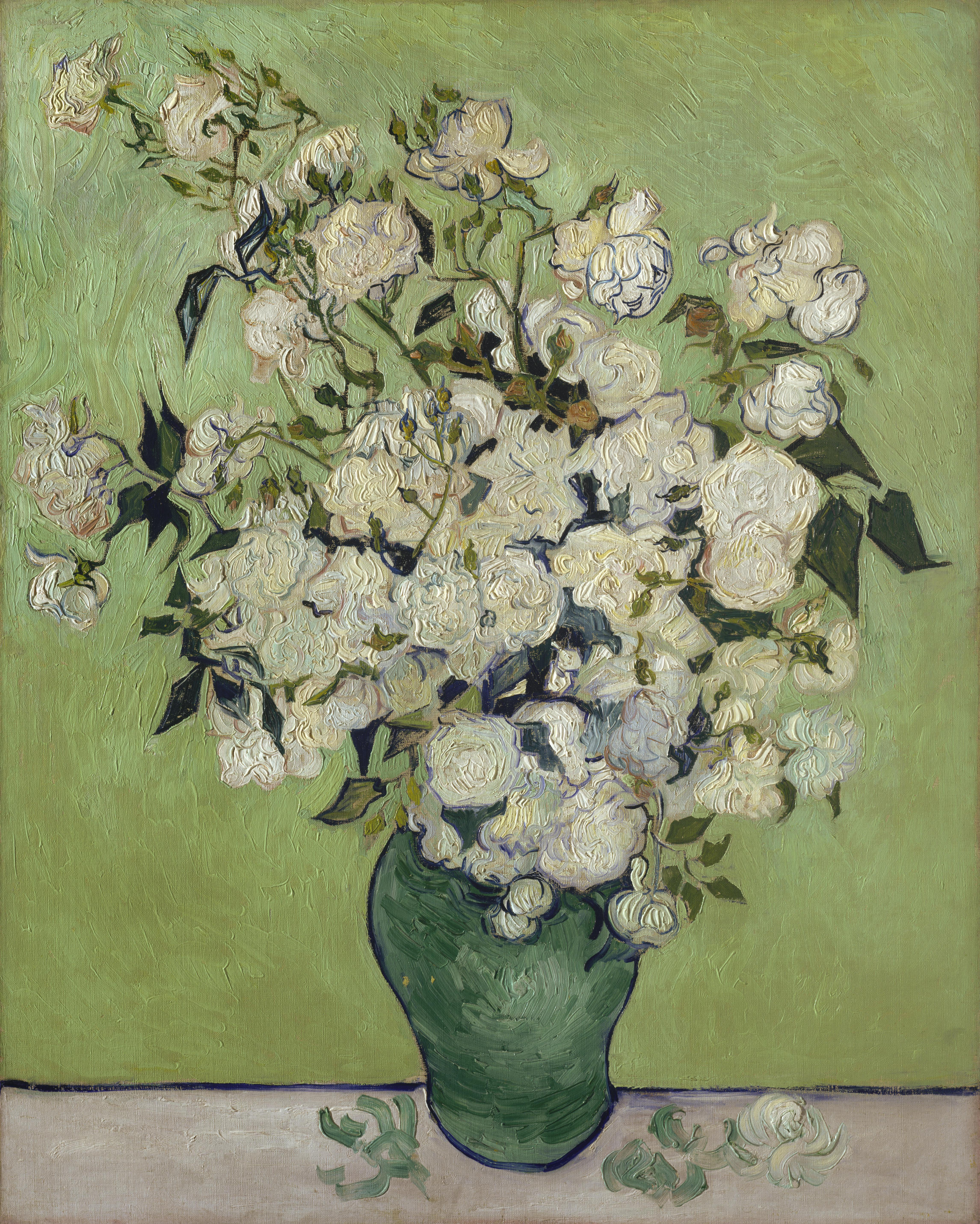
Vincent van Gogh:
Weiße Rosen
Metropolitan Museum of Art, New York City

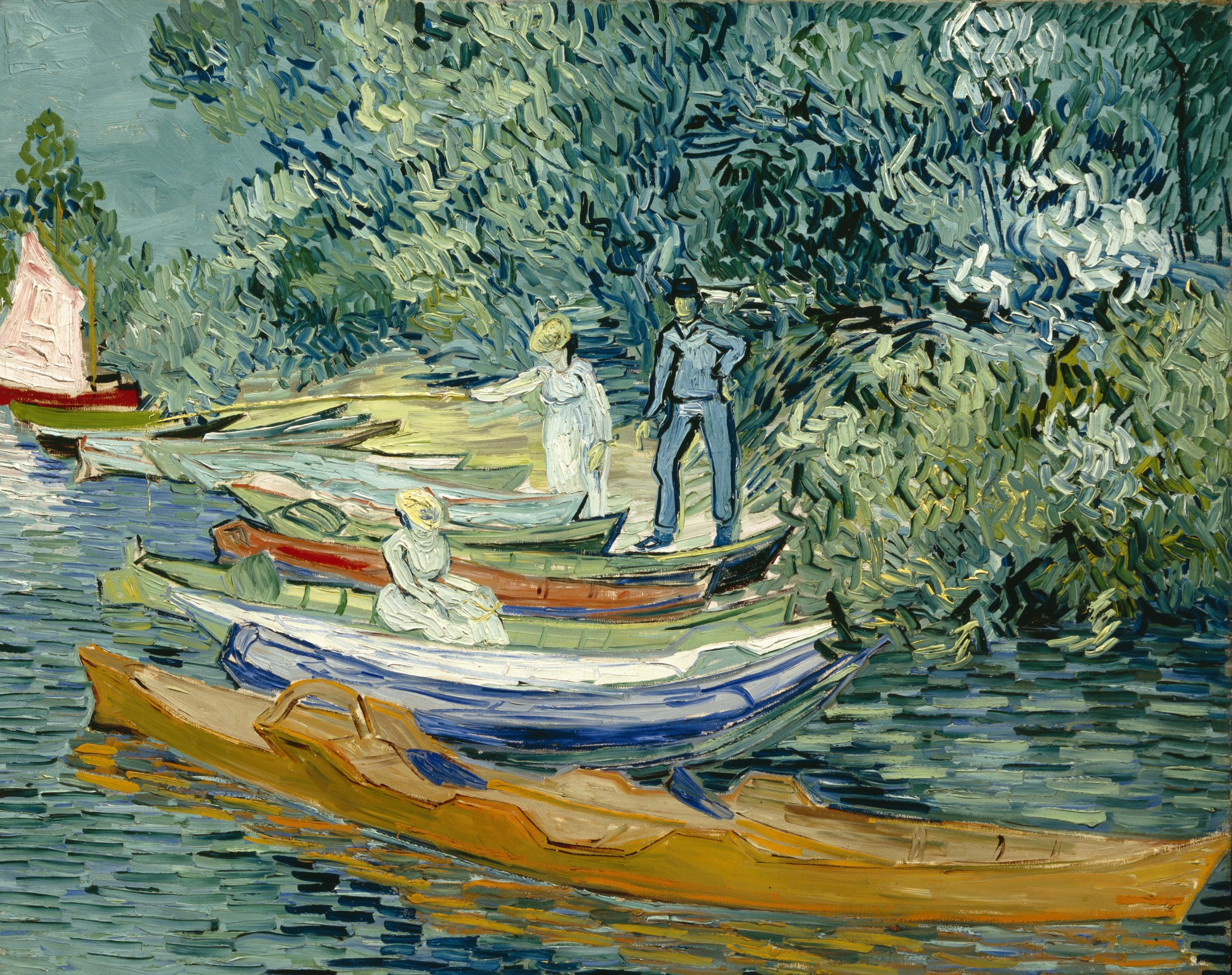
Vincent van Gogh:
Am Ufer der Oise in Auvers (The Bank of Oise at Auvers)
Detroit Institute of Arts

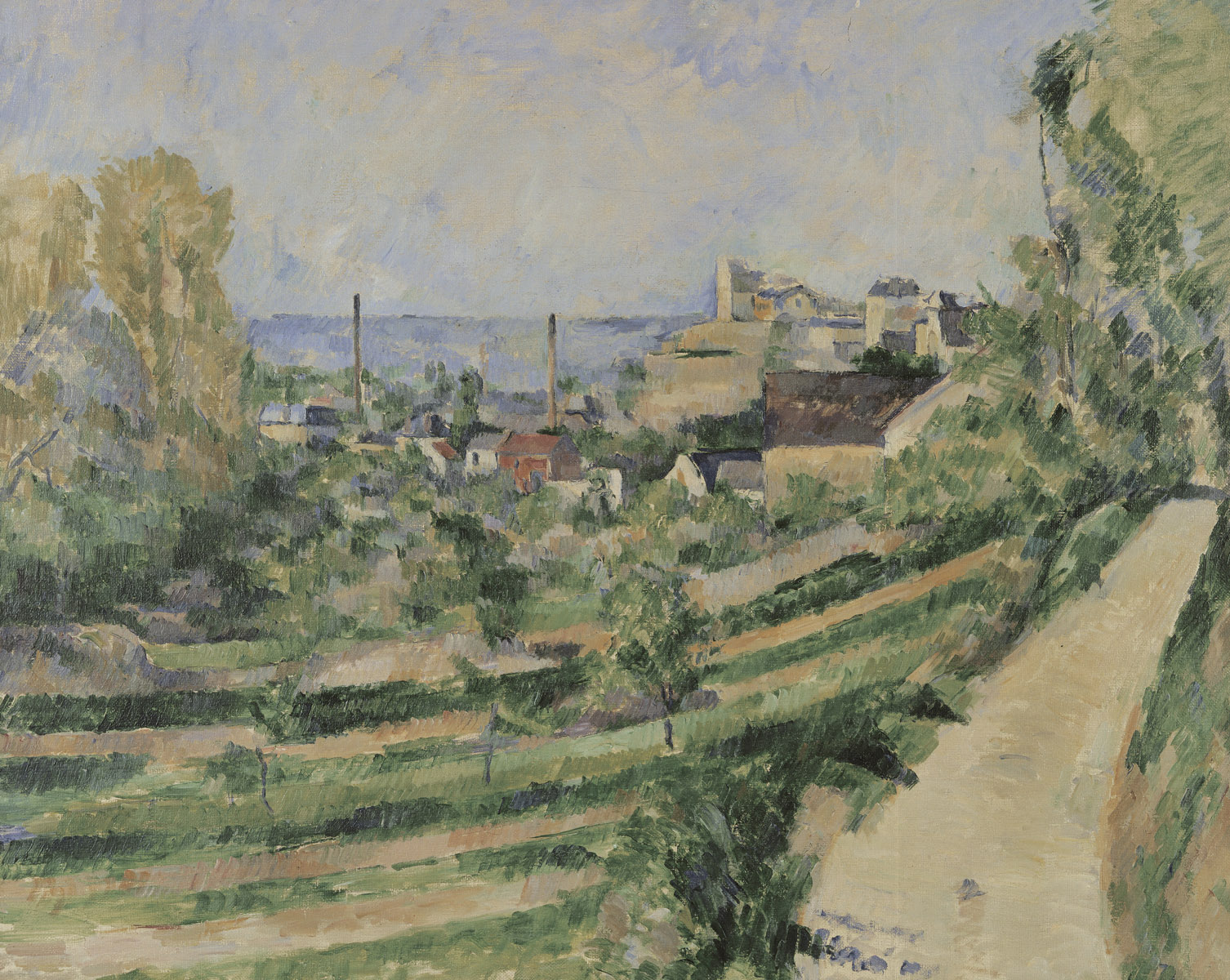
Paul Cézanne:
Dorf und Meer bei l’Estaque
Sammlung Rosengart, Luzern

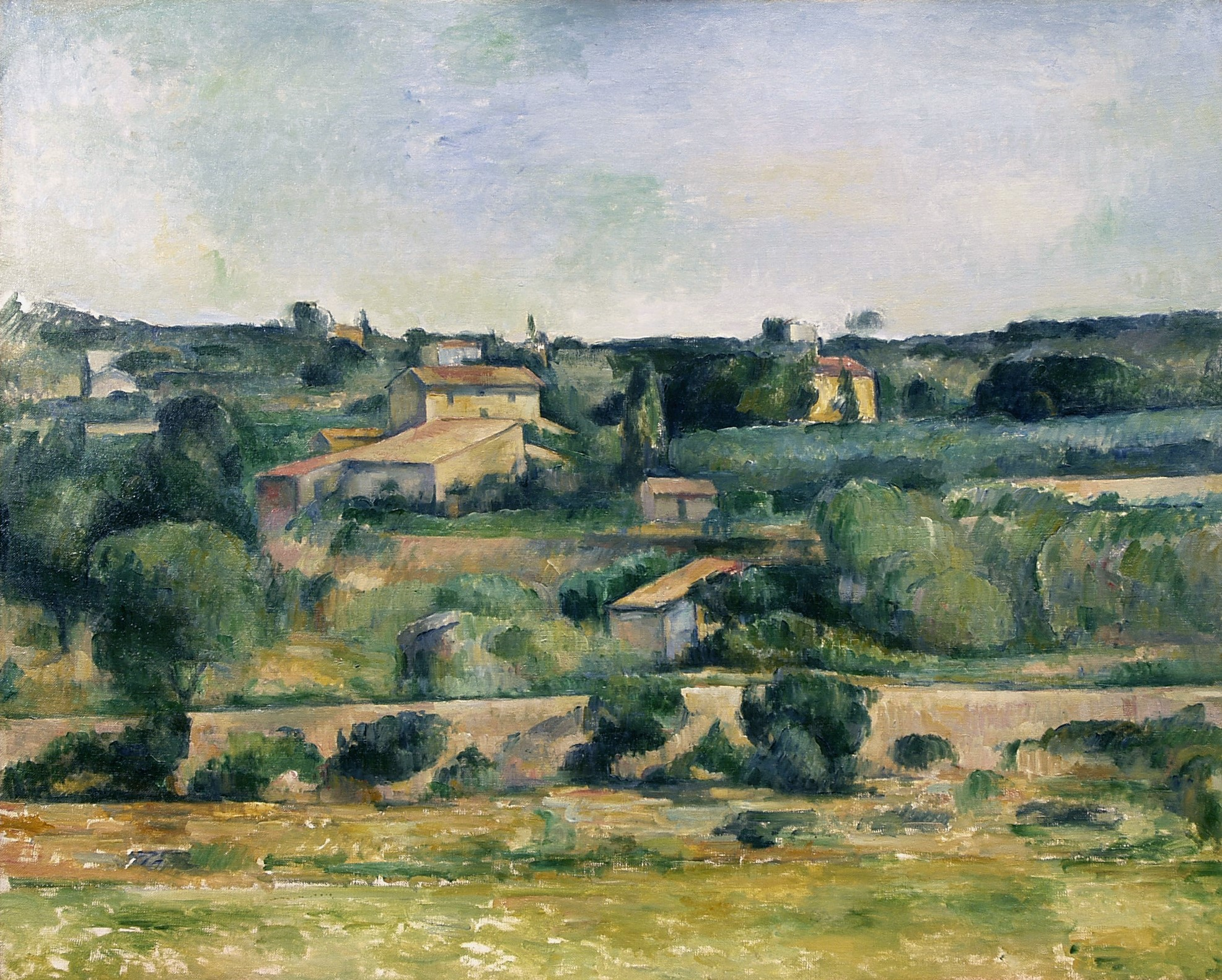
Paul Cézanne:
In der Ebene von Bellevue
Wallraf-Richartz-Museum & Fondation Corboud, Köln

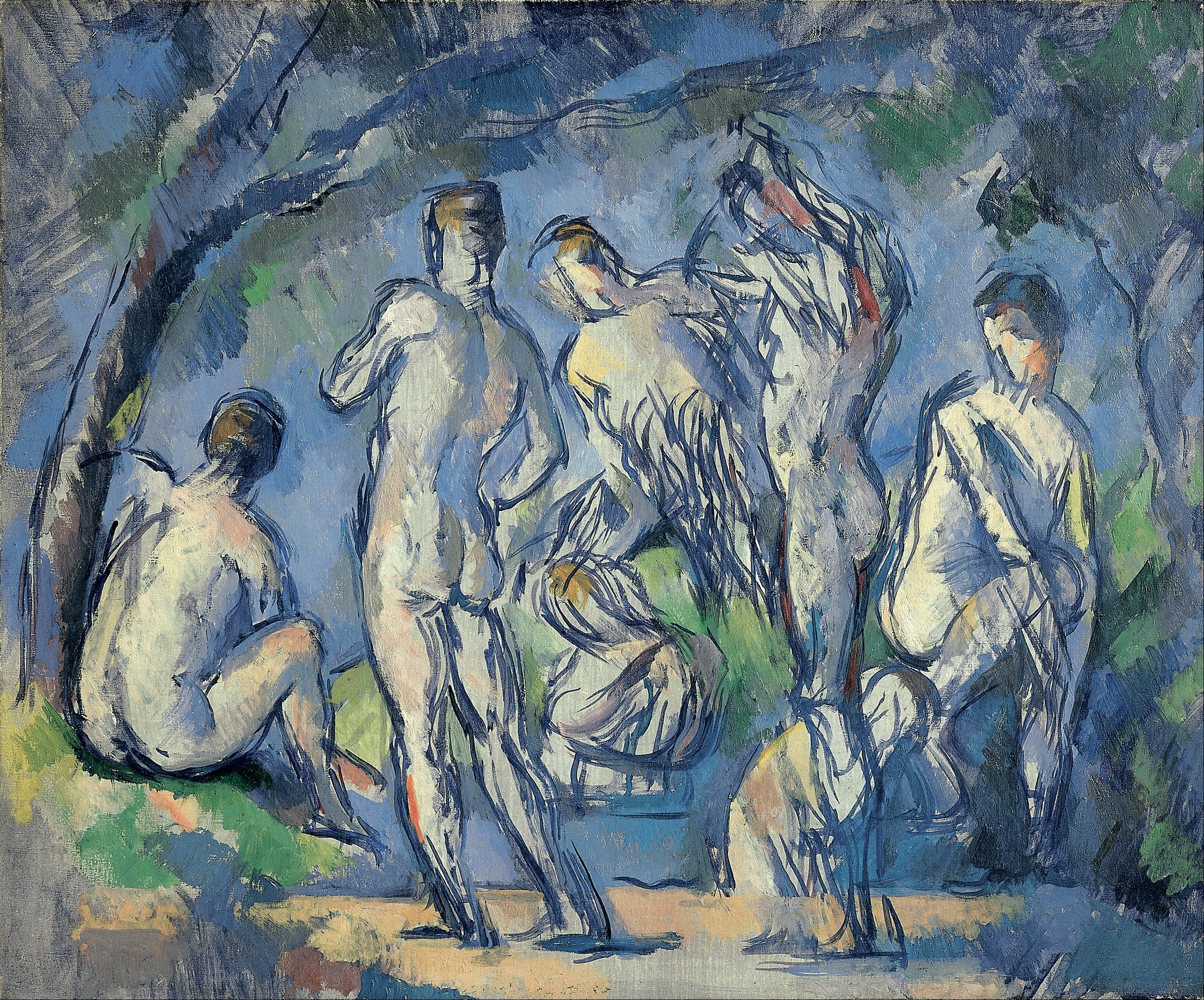
Paul Cézanne:
Sieben Badende
Fondation Beyeler, Riehen

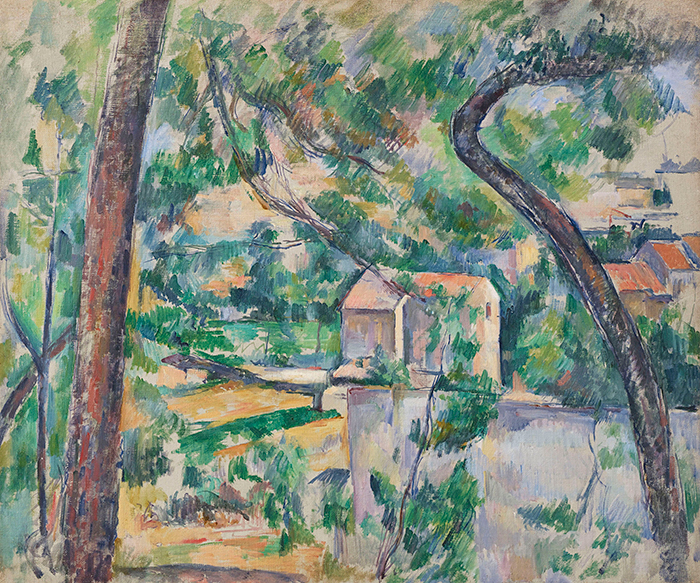
Paul Cézanne:
Der gekrümmte Baum
Hiroshima Museum of Art

Oppenheim's collection was best known for the works of Paul Cezanne. These included the paintings Village and Sea at l'Estaque (Rosengart Collection, Lucerne), The Bent Tree (Hiroshima Museum of Art), In the Plain of Bellevue (Wallraf-Richartz-Museum & Fondation Corboud, Cologne) and Seven Bathers (Fondation Beyeler, Riehen), which are now in public collections. One landscape has belonged to the Swedish National Museum since 1916. The following paintings are privately owned: Bathing Woman, House with Red Roof (Le jas de Bouffan), The Houses at Bellevue with Dovecote, Surroundings of Marseille/The Stagecoach and Surroundings of Gardanne, The collector also owned the Cézanne watercolor Bare Trees (whereabouts unknown) and the watercolor pencil drawings La montagne Sainte-Victoire (privately owned), Forest Interior, and Forest Path (whereabouts unknown).

From the German-speaking world, Oppenheim acquired a painting version of Max Slevogt's Parrot Man from 1901 (private collection). Among her later acquisitions were the Expressionist paintings Toledo by Oskar Kokoschka from 1925 (Musée Jenisch, Fondation Oskar Kokoschka, Vevey) and Die Loge by Max Beckmann from 1928 (Staatsgalerie Stuttgart).

== Claims for restitution for Nazi era forced sales ==
in 2018 the Oppenheim heirs reached a settlement with the Staatliche Museen zu Berlin, resulting in the restitution of eleven objects of which five works were repurchased for the museums. These include a putto with panther made of Frankenthal porcelain from 1754 in the Museum of Decorative Arts and a statuette of the Virgin Mary made of spindle tree wood in Passau around 1520 in the Sculpture Collection in the Bode Museum. They were located in the Kunstgewerbemuseum (Museum of Decorative Arts) and the Skulpturensammlung (Sculpture Collection) of the Staatliche Museen zu Berlin (National Museums in Berlin). The GRASSI Museum für Angewandte Kunst in Leipzig (Leipzig Museum of Applied Arts), returned 25 objects to the Oppenheim heirs.

Object from the Reichenheim-Oppenheim collection are found in numerous museums. The Art Institute of Chicago holds a richly decorated silver salt vessel, made in the Netherlands around 1575-1600. The Metropolitan Museum of Art in New York City houses a landscape-painted porcelain cup and matching saucer from about 1730-1740 from the workshop of Charles Fromery and a silver reliquary pendant from the Rhineland of the late 14th century. A snuff box made of Meissen porcelain is now part of the collection of the Rijksmuseum in Amsterdam, and a lidded tankard with a pouring tube is in the Grassimuseum in Leipzig.

Research into the loss of the Oppenheim collection during the Nazi era continues.

== Literature ==
- Götz Adriani: Cézanne – Gemälde. DuMont, Köln 1993, ISBN 978-3-8321-7161-2.
- Anna-Carolin Augustin: Berliner Kunstmatronage: Sammlerinnen und Förderinnen bildender Kunst um 1900, Wallstein Verlag, Göttingen 2018, ISBN 978-3-8353-3180-8.
- Auktionshaus Julius Böhler (Hrsg.): Sammlung Frau Margarete Oppenheim. Ausstellung vom 23. April bis 15. Mai 1936 – täglich, mit Ausnahme der Sonntage – bei Julius Böhler. Versteigerung am 18., 19., 20., und – falls nötig – am 22. Mai 1936; München: Julius Böhler 1936.
- Cella-Margaretha Girardet: Jüdische Mäzene für die Preußischen Museen zu Berlin, eine Studie zum Mäzenatentum im Deutschen Kaiserreich und in der Weimarer Republik. Hänsel-Hohenhausen, Egelsbach 1997, ISBN 3-8267-1133-5.
- Johann Georg von Hohenzollern: Manet bis van Gogh: Hugo von Tschudi und der Kampf um die Moderne. Prestel, München 1996, ISBN 3-7913-1748-2.
- Bruno Jahn: Der Kaiser Friedrich Museumsverein (KFMV) und seine ehemaligen jüdischen Mitglieder/Mitglieder jüdischer Herkunft. Förderverein der Gemäldegalerie und Skulpturensammlung SMB e.V. seit 1897, Berlin 2018.
- Elke-Vera Kotowski (Hrsg.): Salondamen und Frauenzimmer, Selbstemanzipation deutsch-jüdischer Frauen in zwei Jahrhunderten. De Gruyter Oldenbourg, Berlin u. a. 2016, ISBN 978-3-11-027663-3.
- Sebastian Panwitz: "... das Departement Kunst untersteht meiner Frau". Margarete Oppenheim und ihre Sammlung; in: Anna-Dorothea Ludewig u. a. (Hrsg.): Aufbruch in die Moderne: Sammler, Mäzene und Kunsthändler in Berlin 1880–1933. DuMont, Köln 2012, p. 120–135, ISBN 978-3-8321-9428-4.
- Auktionshaus Adolf Weinmüller (Hrsg.): Altes Kunstgewerbe aus der Sammlung Frau Margarete Oppenheim. – Orientteppiche, Textilien und Keramik eines westdeutschen Sammlers. – Asiatische Plastik eines sächsischen Sammlers. Auktionskatalog des Münchener Kunstversteigerungshauses Adolf Weinmüller für die Versteigerung am 2. und 3. Dezember 1936.
