= Franz Oppenheim =

German chemist

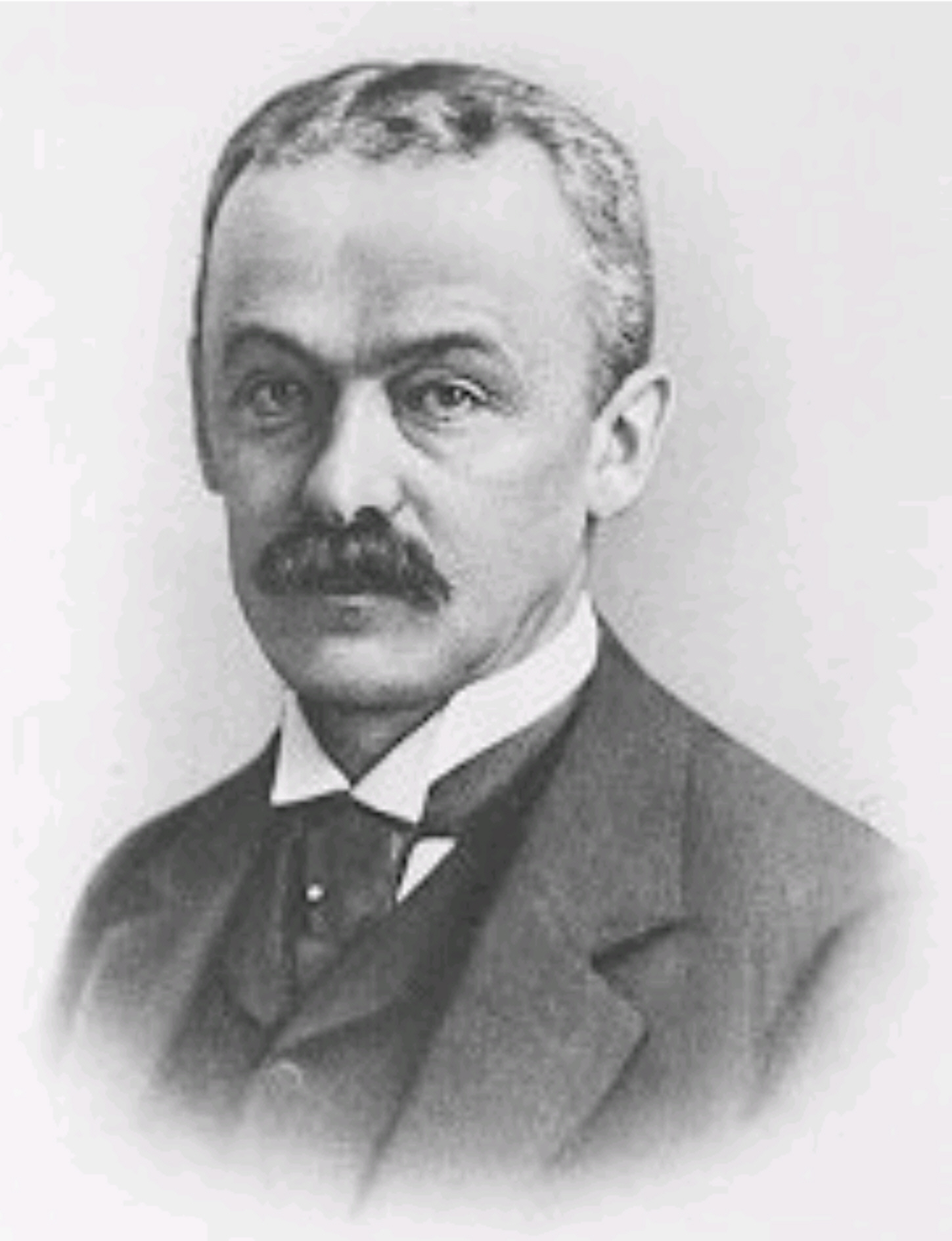
Franz Oppenheim

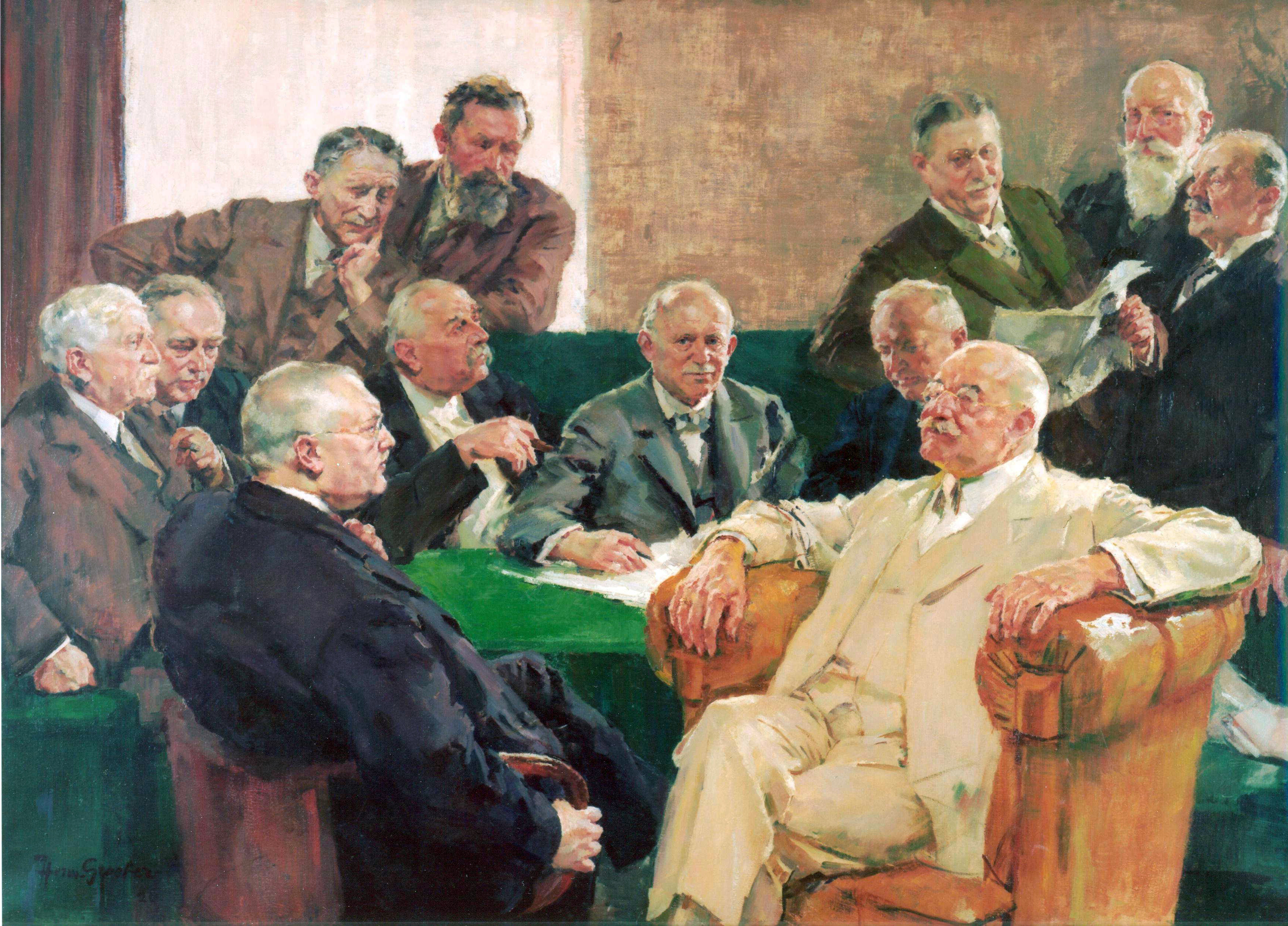
Hermann Groeber: Franz Oppenheim (first standing on the right) in supervisory board of I.G. Farben, 1926

Franz Oppenheim (born 13 July 1852 in Charlottenburg; died 13 February 1929 in Cairo) was a German chemist and industrialist who led the Agfa company (now Agfa-Gevaert) and later became a co-founder of I.G. Farben. His father was German jurist Otto Georg Oppenheim and his mother was Margarethe Mendelssohn (1823–1890). His sisters were Else (1844–1868) and Enole Oppenheim (1855–1939). He lived with his family in Berlin-Wannsee.

== Life ==
Oppenheim went to school at Friedrich Wilhelm Gymnasium in Berlin. He studied chemistry in Heildelberg and since 1874 in Bonn. Oppenheim married Else Wollheim (1858–1904), with her he had four children: Rose, Martha, Franz Caesar and Kurt Oppenheim. After the death of his first spouse he married Margarete Eisner in 1907. In Cologne Oppenheim worked first for company Vorster & Grüneberg. Oppenheim worked since 1928 for German company Agfa in Berlin. Oppenheim was also an art collector.

== Literature ==
- Fritz Haber: "Franz Oppenheim in memory of the anniversary of his death (13 February 1929). At the same time a contribution to the history of the Aktien-Gesellschaft für Anilinfabrikation". In Journal for Applied Chemistry 43, 1930, pp. 141–145, doi: 10.1002 / anie.19300430702 .
- Jens Ulrich Heine: A 28 - Franz Oppenheim . In: Mind and Fate. The men of I. G. Farbenindustrie AG in 161 short biographies . Weinheim u. a. 1990, pp. 226–228
- Bernd Wöbke: Oppenheim, Franz. In Neue Deutsche Biographie (NDB). Volume 19, Duncker & Humblot, Berlin 1999, ISBN 3-428-00200-8 , p. 563 f. ( Digitized version ).

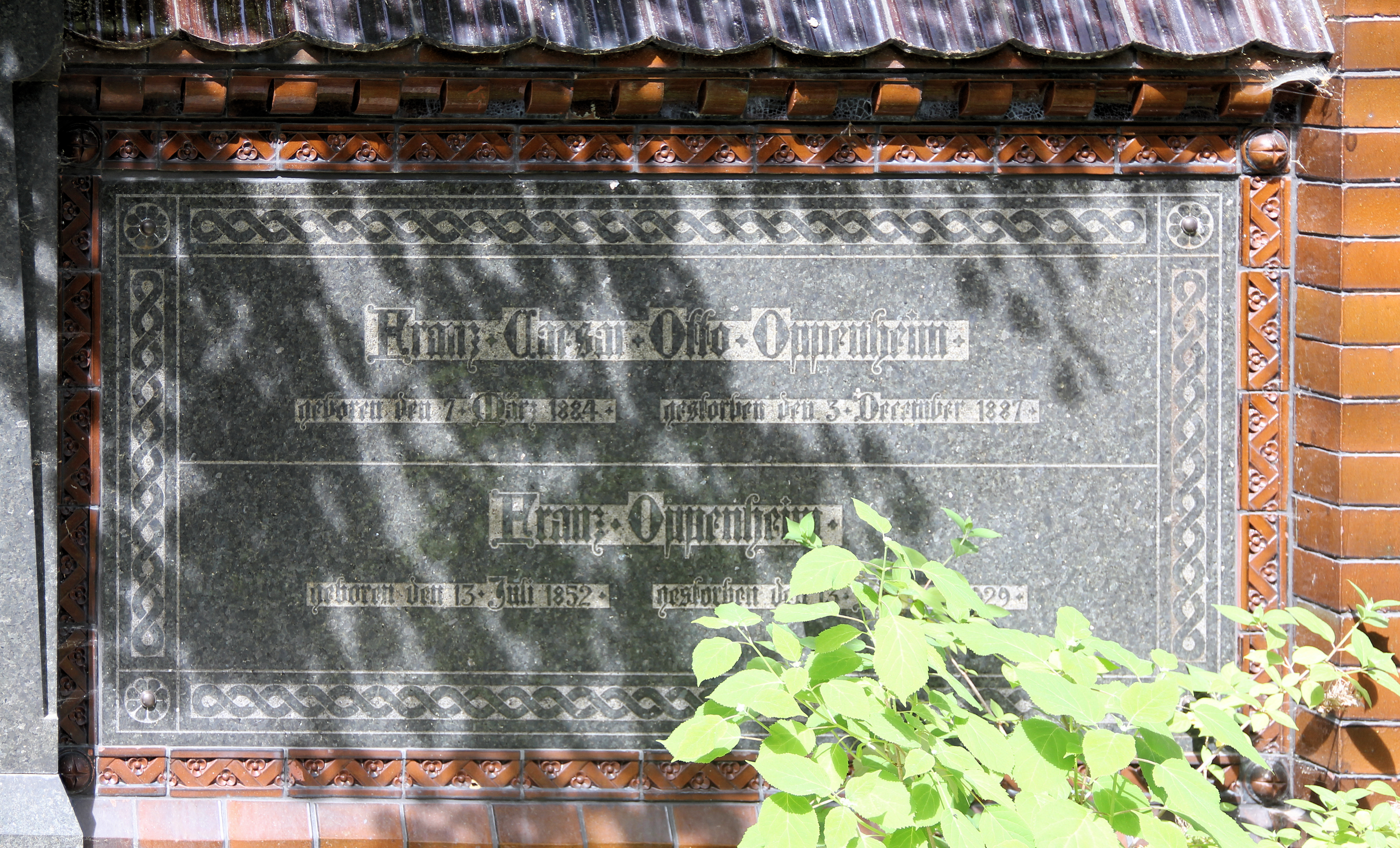
Memorial plaque in Berlin

== See also ==
- Paul von Mendelssohn-Bartholdy
- Aryanization
- History of the Jews in Germany
