= Paul von Mendelssohn-Bartholdy =

Paul Robert Ernst von Mendelssohn-Bartholdy
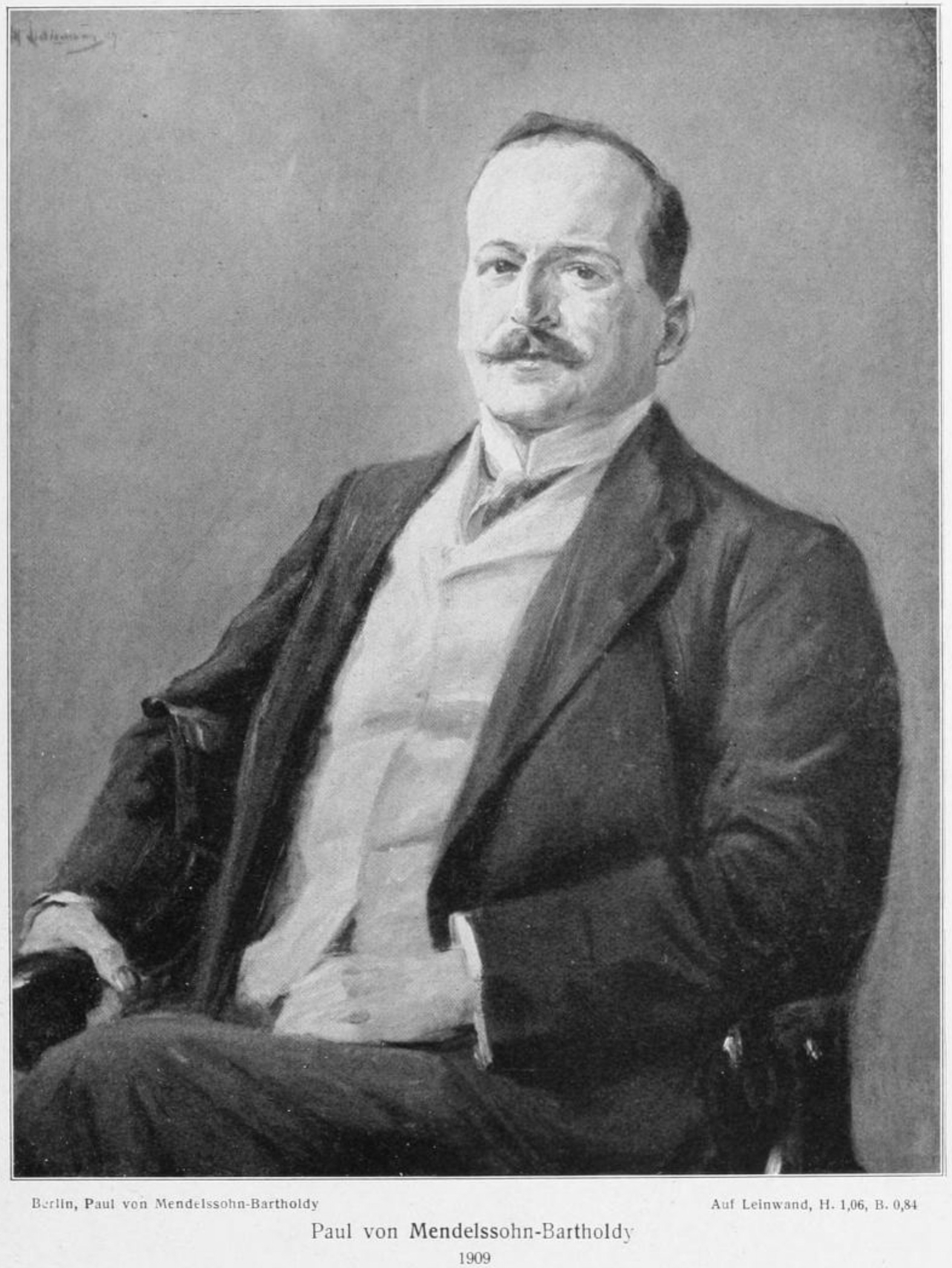
- Paul von Mendelssohn-Bartholdy; oil painting by Max Liebermann, 1909
- Born: Paul Robert Ernst von Mendelssohn-Bartholdy; 14 November 1875; Berlin, Germany
- Died: 10 May 1935 (aged 59); Berlin, Germany
- Resting place: Börnicke
- Education: Balliol College, Oxford; University of Bonn; University of Berlin
- Occupations: Banker, Art Collector
- Spouses: Lotte von Mendelssohn-Bartholdy (m. 1902; div.); * Elsa Lucy Emmy Lolo von Lavergne-Péguilhen (m. after divorce)
- Parents: Ernst von Mendelssohn-Bartholdy (father); * Marie Warschauer (mother)
- Family: Mendelssohn family

Paul Robert Ernst von Mendelssohn-Bartholdy (born 14 November 1875 in Berlin; died 10 May 1935) was a German Jewish banker and art collector. The persecution of his family under the Nazis has resulted in numerous lawsuits for restitution.

== Life ==
Paul von Mendelssohn-Bartholdy was the eldest son of the banker Ernst von Mendelssohn-Bartholdy (1846–1909) and Marie, née Warschauer (1855–1906), alumna of Somerville College, Oxford, and great-great-granddaughter of Moses Mendelssohn. After a few months at Balliol College in Oxford, studying law in Bonn and Berlin, and joining the Society of Friends in 1901, he became a partner in the family bank Mendelssohn & Co. in early 1902. A few months later, he married Charlotte (Lotte) Reichenheim, who became known as Lotte von Mendelssohn-Bartholdy. The couple remained childless. After the divorce, he married Elsa Lucy Emmy Lolo von Lavergne-Péguilhen (born 8 January 1899 in Strasbourg; died 11 March 1986).

== Art collection ==
Together with his wife, Lotte, Paul von Mendelssohn-Bartholdy built a collection of the finest quality paintings by Pablo Picasso (Boy with Horse and Le Moulin de La Galette) in the Stadtpalais Alsenstrasse 3 / 3a (architect: Bruno Paul) and in Schloss Börnicke (rebuilt by the same architect), Vincent van Gogh ("Sunflowers", "Mutter Roulin im Profil, mit ihren Bab"y, "St. Paul's Krankenhaus", "Junges Mädschen mit Kornblume" and "Trunk of an old yellow tree"). They also owned artworks by Claude Monet, Edouard Manet, Pierre-Auguste Renoir, and Georges Braque as well as by Henri Rousseau, Dégas, Cézanne, Derain, and Toulouse-Lautrec.

== Nazi persecution ==
When the Nazis rose to power in 1933, von Mendelssohn-Bartholdly was persecuted because of his Jewish origin. Nazi laws designed to ostracize, bankrupt and plunder the Jews were applied to the Mendelssohn-Bartholdy family.

Much controversy surrounds the circumstances under which Mendelssohn-Bartholdy and his heirs relinquished the artworks in his collection, under the Third Reich's racial laws, which forced family members into exile and the destruction via Aryanisation of their bank Mendelssohn & Co.

A series of lawsuits demanding the restitution of the Mendelssohn-Bartholdy artworks was initiated in 2008 by the heirs of Mendelssohn, with Julius H. Schoeps as their spokesman. The artworks claimed included:

- Picasso's Boy leading a horse, settlement reached between the heirs and the Museum of Modern Art in New York.
- Picasso's Le Moulin de la Galette, settlement reached between the heirs and the Guggenheim Museum
- Picasso's Portrait of Angel Fernández de Soto, settlement reached between heirs and Andrew Lloyd Webber Foundation.
- Picasso's Head of a Woman, restituted to the heirs by the National Gallery of Art in Washington, DC,
- Picasso's Madame Soler: The Bavarian State Painting Collections bought the painting from Justin Thannhauser in 1964. restitution refused by Bavaria.

There was also a question concerning the Picasso's Boy with a Pipe which Mendelssohn-Bartoldy's widow had sold to Walter Feilchenfeldt, Zürich, who sold it to Mr. and Mrs. John Hay Whitney in 1950.

== Gallery ==
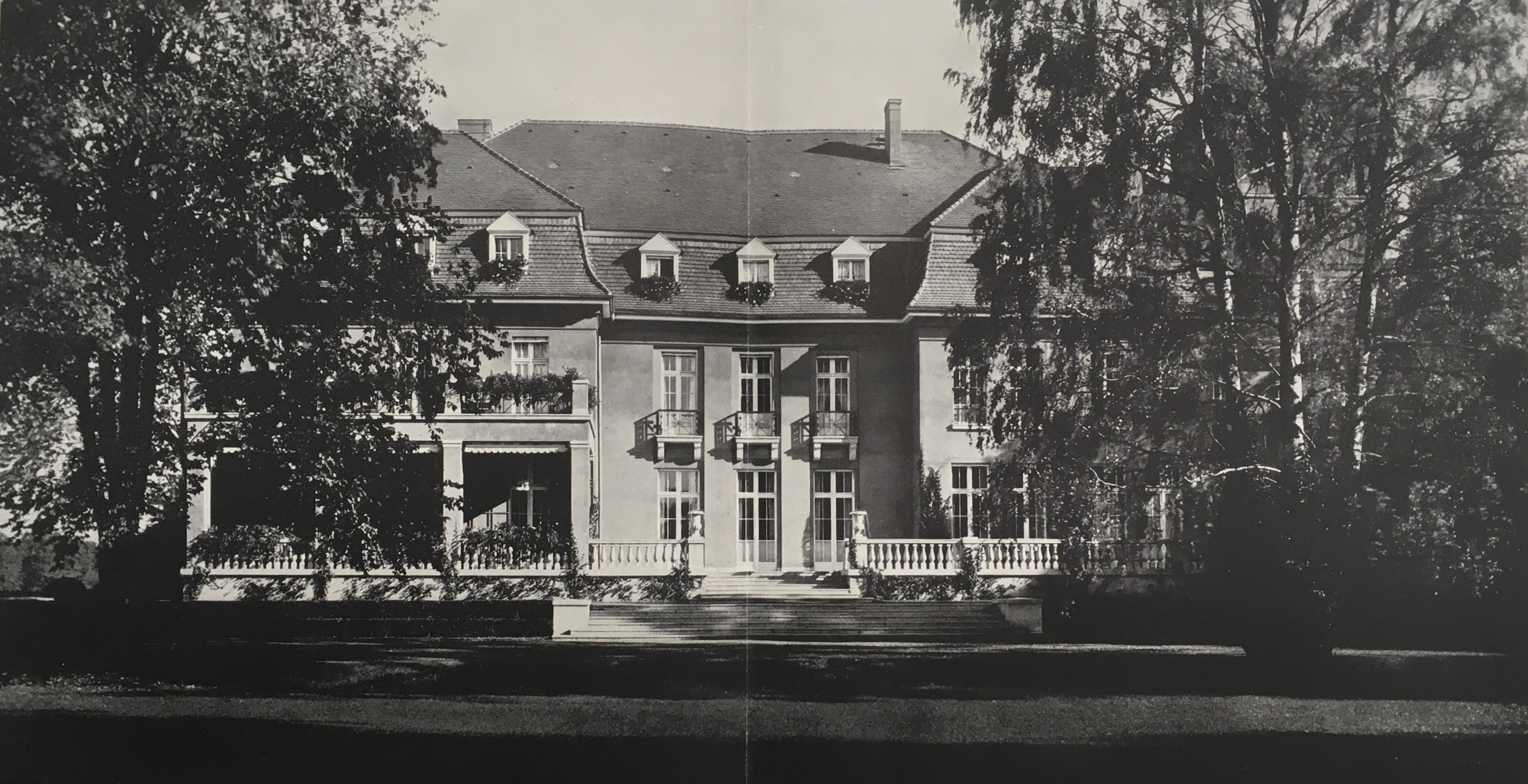
Schloss Börnicke. During World War II, the castle served as one of the temporary accommodations for the Swiss Legation in Berlin before it was relocated to Schloss Höhenried.

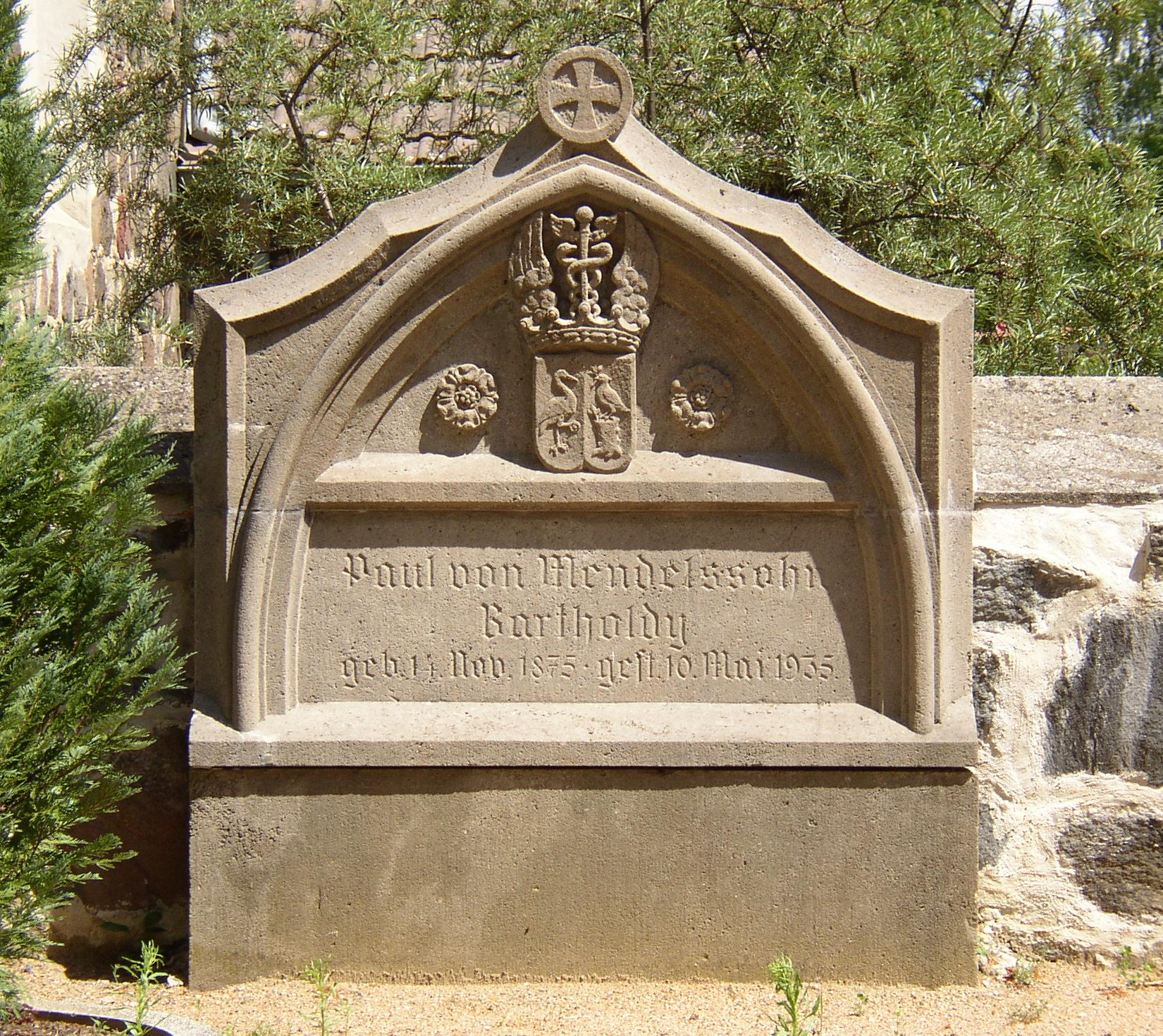
Grave of Paul von Mendelssohn Bartholdy in Börnicke.

== Literature ==
- Hans-Günther Klein: Miszellen zu Ernst und Paul von Mendelssohn-Bartholdy. In: Mendelssohn-Studien. Band 11, 1999, S. 207–215.
- Thomas Lackmann: Das Glück der Mendelssohns – Geschichte einer deutschen Familie. Aufbau, Berlin 2005, ISBN 3-351-02600-5.
- Julius H. Schoeps: Enteignet durch die Bundesrepublik Deutschland: Der Fall Mendelssohn-Bartholdy: Eine Dokumentation. Philo, Bodenheim 1997 (Publikation des Moses Mendelssohn Zentrum für europäisch-jüdische Studien; Universität Potsdam) ISBN 3825700453, ISBN 9783825700454.
- Homepage zur Gesellschaft der Freunde
