= Laub =

Laub may refer to:

== People ==
- Bill Laub (1878–1963), Mayor and American football player-coach
- Daryl Laub (1925–2015), television and radio personality
- Donald Laub (1935–2024), American plastic surgeon
- Dori Laub (1937–2018), Israeli-American psychiatrist and psychoanalyst
- Ferdinand Laub (1832–1875), Czech violinist
- Gabriel Laub (1928–1998), journalist, satirist and writer
- Gillian Laub (born 1975), American photographer and film maker
- Henry Laub (1792–1813), officer in the United States Navy
- Jack Laub (1926–2023), American basketball player and pharmaceutical executive
- Jakob Laub (1884–1962), Austria-Hungarian physicist
- John Laub (born 1953), American criminologist
- Martin Laub (born 1944), American politician
- Michael Laub (born 1953), stage director and dance choreographer
- Michel Laub (born 1973), Brazilian writer and journalist
- Ole Henrik Laub (1937–2019), Danish novelist
- Phoebe Laub (1950–2011), American singer, songwriter, and guitarist
- Richard Laub, American scientist
- Stephen Laub (born 1945), American artist
- Thomas Laub (1852–1927), Danish organist and composer

== Other uses ==
- Laub (card suit), a suit used on German playing cards
- USS Laub, several ships

== See also ==
- Laube, a surname
- Lob (disambiguation)
