= Polwhele =

Polwhele is a surname. Notable people with the surname include:

- John Polwhele Blatchley (1913–2008), London-born car designer known for his work with J Gurney Nutting and Rolls-Royce
- Elizabeth Polwhele (1651–1691), playwright, one of the first women to write for the professional stage in London
- Richard Polwhele (1760–1838), Cornish clergyman, poet and historian of Cornwall and Devon
- Theophilus Polwhele (died 1689), English ejected minister

== See also ==
- Powel (disambiguation)
- Powle
