= Action off Cape Bougaroun =

1943 Luftwaffe operation in World War II

- Part of the Battle of the Mediterranean of World War II
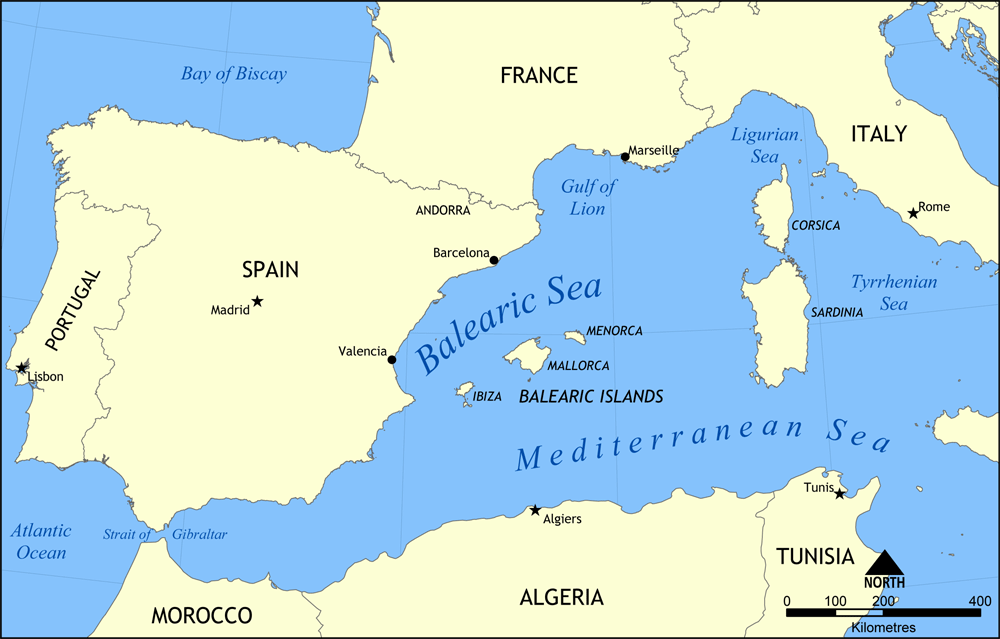
- Map showing Cape Bougaroun, to the east of Algiers
Date	6 November 1943
Location	Mediterranean Sea off Cape Bougaroun, Algeria
Result	German victory

Belligerents
United States; United Kingdom; (Kingdom of Greece) Greece; Netherlands	Germany

Commanders and leaders
(United States) Charles C. Hartman	

Strength
1 cruiser; 10 destroyers; 4 destroyer escorts; 26 merchant ships	25 aircraft

Casualties and losses
4 killed; 1 destroyer sunk; 2 merchant ships sunk; 1 destroyer damaged; 2 merchant ships damaged	~10 killed; 7 aircraft shot down

The action off Cape Bougaroun (Cap Bougaroûn) [Attack on Convoy KMF 25A], was a Luftwaffe operation against an Allied naval convoy off the coast of Algeria during World War II. The convoy of American, British, Greek and Dutch ships was attacked on 6 November 1943 by 25 German bombers and torpedo-bombers.

Six Allied vessels were sunk or damaged and seven German aircraft were shot down. The Germans had achieved a tactical victory, though the Allied fighter escorts and warships were praised for shooting down so many bombers. At least 1,400 men and women were killed but the rescue effort led to the saving of over 6,000 passengers and crew.

== Background ==
=== Task Group 60.2 ===
Before the routine convoying of transatlantic convoys to Bizerta (now Bizerte) in Tunisia, US convoy escorts occasionally supplemented British convoy escorts in the Mediterranean. Task Group 60.2 (Captain Charles C. Hartman USN) escorted Convoy UGF 10 across the Atlantic to Oran and then escorted several convoys in the Mediterranean. On 3 September 1943, the convoy being escorted was attacked by the Luftwaffe, which failed to hit merchant ships but torpedoed the destroyer USS Kendrick in the stern, the destroyer making its own way to port. The task group escorted two more convoys and was then assigned to escort Convoy KMF 25A, a troop convoy from Britain.

=== Hs 293 glide bombs ===
Kampfgeschwader 26 began operations over the Mediterranean as a torpedo-bomber unit in early 1941. II./KG 26 was equipped with He 111 torpedo-bombers and III./KG 26 flew Junkers Ju 88 torpedo-bombers and practiced Zangenangriffe (pincer-attacks) when a Staffel of torpedo-bombers swarmed targets, to prevent them from maneuvering as they could to evade torpedoes dropped from one direction. A specialist Luftwaffe unit, Kampfgeschwader 100 (KG 100) had been transferred from Italy to a base near Marseille in July 1943, having received more than fifty Dornier Do 217 Sonderkampfflugzeuge (special combat aircraft).

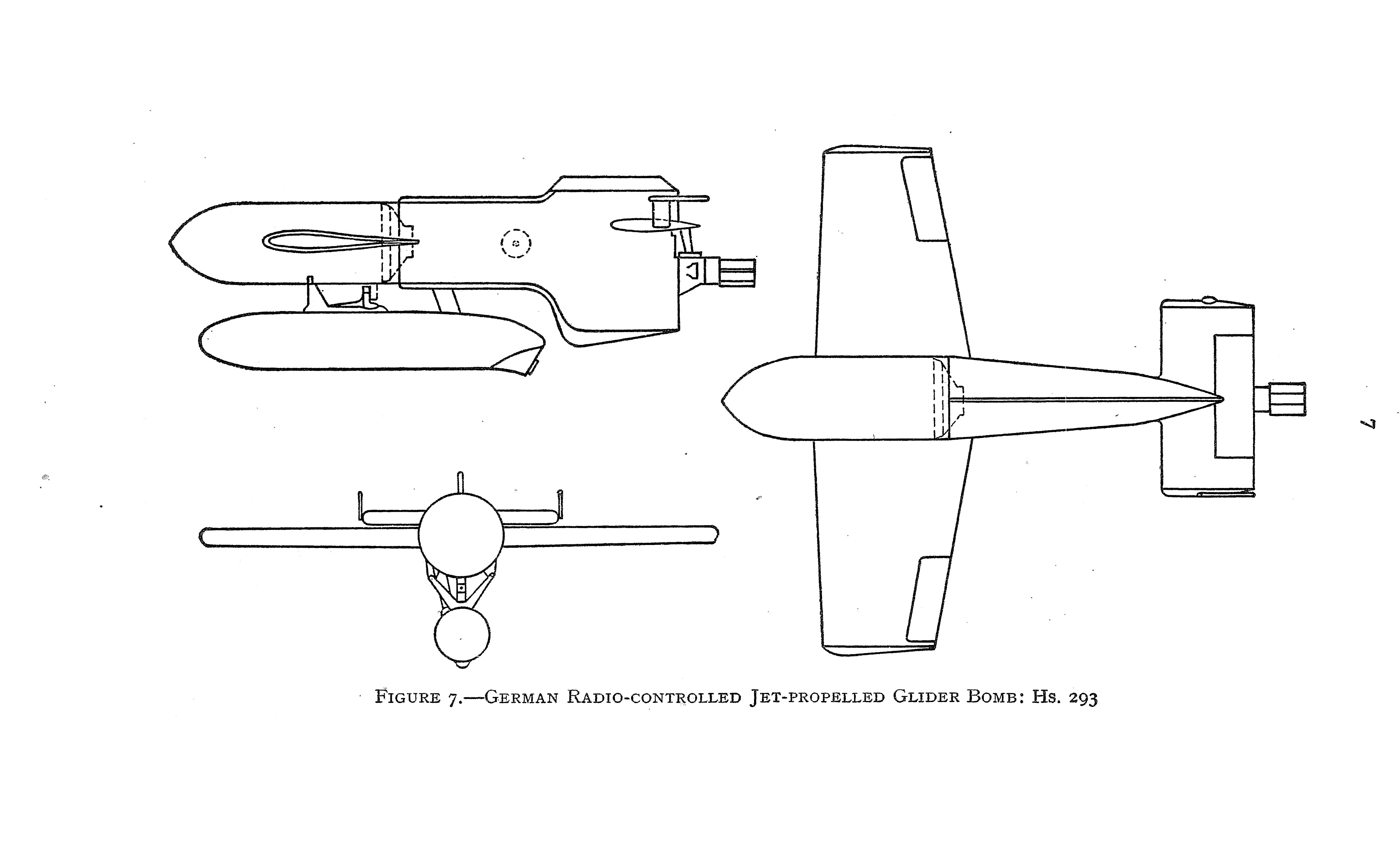
Example of a Hs 293 rocket-boosted glide-bomb

II./KG 100 received Dornier Do 217 E 5 aircraft, equipped for the Hs 293 a wireless guided glide-bomb, accelerated by a rocket motor and Dornier Do 217 K 2 bombers, adapted to use the Fritz X guided bomb, equipped III./KG 100. Both Gruppen went into action in July 1943 against shipping in the Bay of Biscay and the Mediterranean. On 25 August 1943 twelve Do 217E‑5s of II./KG 100, escorted by seven Ju 88C‑6s, attacked the sloops HMS Egret and HMS Bideford and the frigate HMS Waveney. One man killed and 16 injured on Bideford. Two days later, Egret was hit by an Hs 293 from II./KG 100 30 nmi (56 km; 35 mi) west of Vigo and sunk with 198 men killed; the Canadian destroyer HMCS Athabaskan was severely damaged.

=== Convoy KMF 25A and escorts ===
Convoy KMF 25A consisted of 26 merchant ships and troop transports escorted by 15 warships, from Liverpool to Alexandria via Palermo and Naples. Task Group 60.2 (TG 60.2) comprised the British light cruiser HMS Colombo, the destroyers USS Mervine, Davison, Parker, Laub, Beatty, Tillman, McLanahan, the destroyer escorts USS Frederick C. Davis and Herbert C. Jones and the Hunt-class destroyers HMS Croome, Haydon, Tetcott and the Greek HS Kanaris and HS Themistoklis. On 27 October 1943, Convoy KMF 25A sailed from Britain.

== Prelude ==
=== Voyage ===
After passing Gibraltar, the ships were escorted by the Royal Air Force (RAF) in relays. The convoy sailed in columns of seven to nine ships each from Mers-El-Kebir to Naples but formed three columns to pass through the Tunisian War Channel (the Sicilian Narrows). Laub sailed 5 nmi (9.3 km; 5.8 mi) ahead of the fleet on radar watch. Mervine led the warships in a circular course around the three columns. Beatty and Tillman were astern and Mervine was 2,000 yd (1,800 m) ahead, under an overcast sky with the cloud base at 1,000 ft (300 m). On 6 November, Haydon detected an aircraft to the north soon after noon but this was transmitting Allied Identification friend or foe (IFF).

On 26 November, Ju 88s on reconnaissance reported a convoy of 15–25 vessels, including a troopship, off the North African coast. The convoy was protected by a Beaufighter, a Wellington and several single-engined fighters. Convoy KMF 26 was an eastbound troop convoy of 22 merchant vessels and 15 escorts from the Clyde carrying mainly United States Army Air Forces (USAAF) personnel to Alexandria, via Gibraltar. (Note: The Americans were destined for India, to join the Tenth Air Force and the China Burma India theater.) Twenty-two He 177s of II./Kampfgeschwader 40 (Gruppenkommandeur Major Rudolf Mons), took off from Bordeaux-Mérignac, each carrying two Hs 293 glide-bombs. One He 177 crashed on take-off due to an engine failure and caught fire, four of the crew being killed. The rest of the He 177s were followed by 18 Heinkel He 111s from II./KG 26 and 15 Junkers Ju 88s from III./KG 26. Night was falling when the bombers sighted the convoy off Béjaïa, in Algeria.

== Action ==
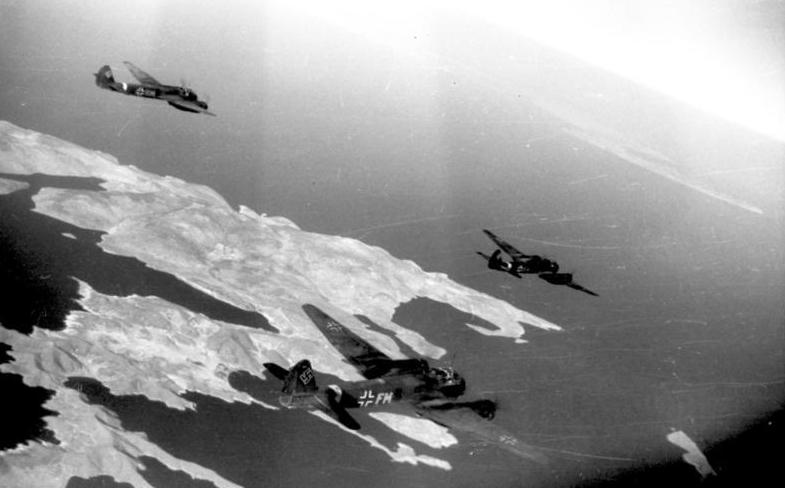
Ju 88s over the Mediterranean in 1943

The convoy went to action stations at 17:36 and about 17:45, the convoy was 35 nmi (65 km; 40 mi) north of Philippeville off Cap Bougaroûn in Algeria (37°05′16″N, 6°28′03″E) when Laub detected six aircraft to the north but these were also transmitting Allied IFF. Hartman signaled the destroyers to make smoke and prepare for action. The passengers were also ordered to go below deck and remain there until the threat was over. At 18:00 Tillman, on the port side of the convoy, detected a contact to the north-west at 8,000 yd (7,300 m), sighted aircraft soon afterwards and opened fire.

As the He 177s attacked, Spitfire VBs from the Free French Groupe de Chasse 1/7, P-39 Airacobras of the 350th Fighter Group (USAAF) and Beaufighter VIFs from 153 Squadron RAF and the 414th Night Fighter Squadron (USAAF) arrived. As the German bombers came within range, the escorts and the merchant ships opened fire. Seconds later, the Germans began glide bombing, the Hs 293 booster rockets looking orangey-red. The bombers concentrated on Tillman which escaped damage by rapid maneuveres and accurate anti-aircraft fire. A He 177 dropped a glide-bomb about 1,000 yd (910 m) off the beam and the automatic weapons on the port side fired at the bomb. When the projectile was 600 yd (550 m) away the bomb was hit and it fell into a steep dive, crashing 150 yd (140 m) off the port side.

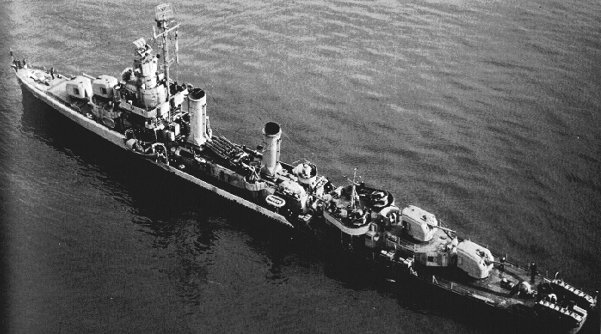
USS Beatty, photographed off New York in January 1943

A second bomber dropped a glide-bomb to port as Tillman was steered back to its place in the convoy screen. Tillman turned towards the bomb and the automatic weapons fired at the bomb as the main guns engaged the bomber. The bomb passed over the bows, turned around and hit the water about 150 yd (140 m) to starboard as the bomber was hit by the 5-inch guns and exploded. A glide-bomb from a third He 177 hit the sea 500 yd (460 m) to starboard. Concussion from the bomb-explosions damaged the fire-control radar and when torpedo-bombers flew low to the port of the convoy, the gunners resorted to aiming by sight. Torpedoes were dropped by a wave of the torpedo-bombers, Tillman combed the tracks and at 18:18 two torpedoes were seen to pass down the starboard side, one exploding in the wake, concussion damaging the hull at the stern.

Beatty (Commander William Outerson) on the starboard side of the convoy detected two aircraft showing Allied IFF at 18:05 16,000 yd (15,000 m) astern but one was seen to be a Ju 88 and Outerson inferred that the IFF was being transmitted by German aircraft. The smoke screen obscured some of the view, two Ju 88s appeared out of it, were engaged by the anti-aircraft armament and turned away. Thirty seconds after the Ju 88s had sheered off, a torpedo hit the after engine room, which broke the ship's back, caused a power-cut throughout the ship and flooded the engine-room. One officer and six men were wounded and Beatty slowly began to sink at 27°12'N, 06°16'E, 40 nmi (74 km; 46 mi) west-north-west of Philippeville. All hands were called on deck but when the ship did not settle, they assisted damage-control parties and began throwing overboard anything that moved.

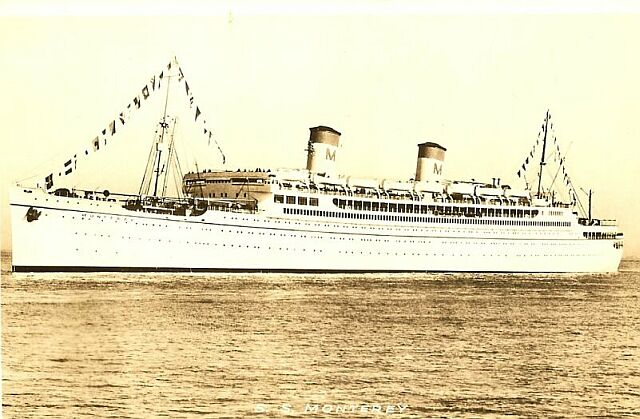
SS Monterey in the 1930s

Beatty began slowly to settle at about 21:00, Laub took off some of the crew and began to rig a towline but it became clear that Beatty could not be saved. At 22:30 as the list reached 45° the remaining crew members abandoned ship, it broke into two parts and sank. About three torpedo-bombers got through the fighters and the escort screen and hit Santa Elena 9,135 GRT (William C. Renaut), at 37°12'N, 06°16E, that sank some hours later at 37°13′N 6°21′E. Santa Elena, carrying 1,965 Canadian troops and nurses was also hit; four crewmen were killed and the American armed guard on board freed several men who were trapped below, 2,163 people surviving. The Dutch troopship MS Marnix van Sint Aldegonde, with 2,924 troops on board, was severely damaged but had no fatalities.

== Aftermath ==
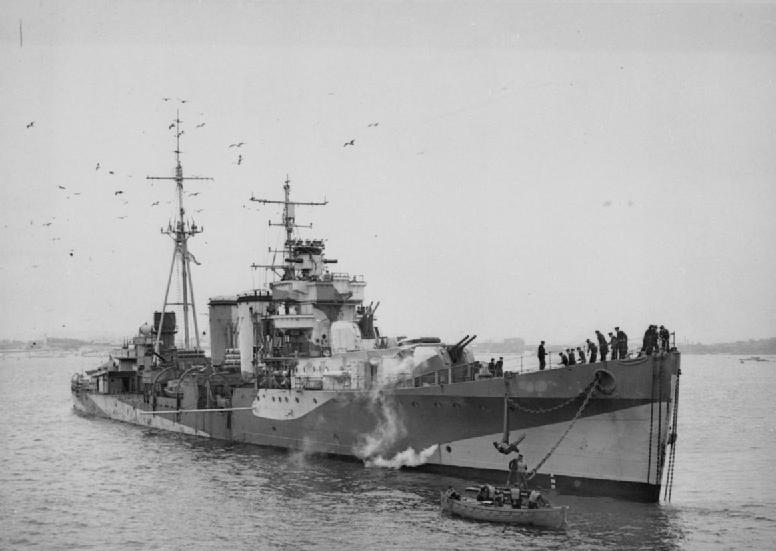
HMS Colombo in July 1943

Hartman ordered the commander of Destroyer Squadron 16, Captain C. J. Cater, to oversee the rescue operation with five of the destroyers as Monterey and Ruyz took off passengers from the damaged troopships, in a heavy swell. Destroyer Division 32 (Commander J. C. Sowell) comrpising USS Champlin, Boyle, Nields and Ordronaux sailed from Algiers but were too late to assist the damaged ships. Tugs from Philippeville were sent to assist and took the damaged liners in tow to Philippeville. Santa Elena sank just short in the outer harbor and Marnixx grounded as attempts were being made to beach it.

Rear Admiral Carleton F. Bryant endorsed Hartman's after action report but was critical of the British organisation of the convoy, writing that the convoy commodore and the escort commander should have been from the same service. Bryant criticised the slow speed of the convoy and should have been at the speed of the slowest ship, not the 12 kn (22 km/h; 14 mph) that it was moving. Once in the Mediterranean, the convoy should have been divided into a fast group and a slow group to benefit from the 18 kn (33 km/h; 21 mph)-speed of some of the ships; Monterey capable of 20 kn (37 km/h; 23 mph) should not have been limited to 12 kn (22 km/h; 14 mph) and the air cover should not have been withdrawn at dusk.

=== Casualties ===
About 300 people were killed by the bombing of Rohna; most of the lifeboats were destroyed or damaged and many of the life-rafts were found to be unusable. Rohna sank within an hour; in the growing darkness and swelling sea the rescuers had great difficulty, leading to the deaths of 1,015 American servicemen, 120 British and Indian crew members, eleven gunners and three Red Cross workers were killed. Four crew were killed in Santa Elena and the American armed guard on board freed several men who were trapped below, 2,163 people surviving. MS Marnix van Sint Aldegonde, with 2,924 troops on board, was severely damaged but with no fatalities.

The rescue operation saved 6,228 people, including the crew of Beatty. The US Navy Armed Guard gunners on board the US ships claimed five aircraft shot down and one probable. Later examination of German records by Gross (2006) showed that three He 111 torpedo-bombers of I./KG 26 and four Ju 88 torpedo-bombers from III./KG 26 were shot down, including Hauptmann Eberhard Peukert, the commander (Staffelkapitän) of 8.Staffel. Two He 177s of 4.Staffel/KG 40 and two of 6.Staffel/KG 40, a He 177 of 6.Staffel ditched off Montpellier and one He 177 was written off after crashing on landing.

== Allied order of battle ==
=== Merchant ships ===
Freighters and troopships
Ship	Year	Flag	GRT	Notes
SS Almanzora	1915	Merchant Navy	15,551	Troopship
USS Andromeda	1943	United States Navy	6,556	Andromeda-class attack cargo ship, Oran to Bizerta
USS Anne Arundel	1941	United States	7,796	
MV Aorangi	1924	Merchant Navy	17,491	Troopship to Algiers
SS Argentina	1929	United States	20,614	WSA troopship, 4,770 soldiers
SS Aronda	1941	Merchant Navy	9,031	Troopship Oran to Augusta
USS Dorothea L. Dix	1940	United States	6,736	
USS Edmund B. Alexander	1905	United States	21,329	Troopship
Hai Lee	1934	Norway	3,616	Troopship to Philippeville
SS Hawaiian Shipper	1941	United States	7,775	
USNS Henry Gibbins	1943	United States	12,097	
USAT James Parker	1939	United States	10,021	2,095 troops
MS John Ericsson	1928	United States	16,552	5,336 troops to Naples
MS Marnix van Sint Aldegonde	1930	Netherlands	19,355	2,924 troops, sunk by torpedo-bombers
SS Monterey	1932	United States	18,017	Ocean Steamship Co., liner, WSA troopship, 3,966 troops
USS Oberon	1942	United States Navy	7,371	Arcturus-class attack cargo ship, Oran to Bizerta
Ruys	1937	Netherlands	14,155	Troopship, via Gibraltar, Algiers and Philippeville
Santa Elena	1933	United States	9,135	WSA transport, 1,848 troops, 101 nurses, sunk, 4 killed (Note: 7 November, foundered off Philippeville, 2,163 survivors)
SS Santa Paula	1932	United States	9,135	WSA
SS Santa Rosa	1932	Merchant Navy	9,135	WSA United States Marine Corps transport
Sloterdijk	1940	Netherlands	9,340	HAL British government charter
MV Staffordshire	1929	Merchant Navy	10,683	Troopship, 1,823 troops
SS Strathmore	1935	Merchant Navy	23,428	Troopship, 5,336 troops
Tegelberg	1937	Netherlands	14,150	Ministry of War Transport charter, troopship
USAT Thomas H. Barry	1930	United States	11,350	
USS Thurston	1942	Merchant Navy	6,509	

=== Convoy escorts ===
Task Group 60.2
Ship	Flag	Type	Notes
HMS Colombo	Royal Navy	C-class cruiser	Escort, 4–8 November
USS Beatty	United States Navy	Gleaves-class destroyer	Escort, 27 October – 6 November, torpedo, sank 23:05
USS Boyle	United States Navy	Benson-class destroyer	Escort, 27 October – 11 November
USS Champlin	United States Navy	Wickes-class destroyer	Escort, 27 October – 11 November
HMS Croome	Royal Navy	Hunt-class destroyer	Escort, 6 November
USS Davison	United States Navy	Gleaves-class destroyer	Escort, 27 October – 8 November
USS Frederick C. Davis	United States Navy	Edsall-class destroyer escort	Escort, 5–8 November, joined from Mers El Kébir
HMS Haydon	Royal Navy	Hunt-class destroyer	Escort, 6–11 November
USS Herbert C. Jones	United States Navy	Edsall-class destroyer escort	Escort, 5–7 November, joined from Mers El Kébir
HS Kanaris	Hellenic Navy	Hunt-class destroyer	Escort 6–11 November
USS Laub	United States Navy	Clemson-class destroyer	Escort, 27 October – 6 November
USS McLanahan	United States Navy	Clemson-class destroyer	Escort, 27 October – 8 November
USS Mervine	United States Navy	Gleaves-class destroyer	Escort, 27 October – 6 November
USS Nields	United States Navy	Benson-class destroyer	Escort, 27 October – 6 November
USS Ordronaux	United States Navy	Benson-class destroyer	Escort, 27 October – 6 November
USS Parker	United States Navy	Benson-class destroyer	Escort, 27 October – 6 November
HMS Tetcott	Royal Navy	Hunt-class destroyer	Escort, 6–11 November
HS Themistoklis	Hellenic Navy	Hunt-class destroyer	Escort, 6–11 November
USS Tillman	United States Navy	Gleaves-class destroyer	Escort, 27 October – 6 November, minor damage

== German order of battle ==
Luftwaffe
Name	Flag	Type	Role	Notes
II./Kampfgeschwader 40	Luftwaffe	Heinkel 177	Hs 293 Glide-bomb	22, -1 crashed on take-off
II./Kampfgeschwader 26	Luftwaffe	Heinkel He 111	Bomber/dive-bomber	18
III./Kampfgeschwader 26	Luftwaffe	Junkers Ju 88	Bomber/dive-bomber	15

== See also ==
- Action off Bougainville
- Mediterranean naval engagements during World War I
