= Lob =

Lob may refer to:

== Sports ==
- Lob (pickleball)
- Lob (tennis)
- Lob (association football), a lofted pass or shot in association football
- Lob bowling, an archaic bowling style in cricket
- A lob pass, a synonym for an alley-oop pass in basketball
  - Lob City, a nickname for the 2010s Los Angeles Clippers of the NBA, primarily referring to the team's trio of Chris Paul, Blake Griffin and DeAndre Jordan

== People ==
- Lob Brown, American college football player
- Löb Nevakhovich (between 1776 and 1778–1831), Russian writer
- Löb Strauß, birth name of Levi Strauss (1829–1902), German-born American businessman
- Eliezer Löb (1837–1892), German rabbi
- Jacques Lob (1932–1990), French comic book creator
- Leopold Löb, birth name of Leopold Einstein (1833–1890), German esperantist
- Martin Löb (1921–2006), German mathematician

== Other uses ==
- Lob (haircut)
- Lob bomb, a rocket-fired improvised explosive device
- Lobi language (ISO 639-3: lob), a Gur language of western Africa
- Lob, in folklore, a type of brownie
- Lob, a poem by Edward Thomas

== See also ==
- LOB (disambiguation)
- Löb (disambiguation)
- Lobb (disambiguation)
- Lobe (disambiguation)
- Laub (disambiguation)
