= Admiral Beatty (disambiguation) =

David Beatty, 1st Earl Beatty (1871–1936) was a Royal Navy admiral. Admiral Beatty may also refer to:

- Frank E. Beatty (1853–1926), U.S. Navy rear admiral
- Frank Edmund Beatty Jr. (1894–1976), U.S. Navy vice admiral

== Other uses ==
- Admiral Beatty Hotel, former Canadian hotel
