= Lobb =

Lobb is a surname of English origin. People with this surname include:

- Arthur Lobb (1871–1928), politician in Manitoba, Canada
- Ben Lobb (born 1976), Canadian politician from Huron—Bruce
- Bryan Lobb (1931–2000), British cricketer
- Dan Lobb (born 1972), British television sports presenter
- John Lobb (c.1866), founder of the company John Lobb Bootmaker
- Ken Lobb (born 1960), U.S. video game designer
- Stephen Lobb (1647–1699), English nonconformist minister and controversialist
- Thomas Lobb (1817–1894), British botanist (brother of William Lobb)
- William Lobb (1809–1864), British botanist (brother of Thomas Lobb)
- Dion Lobb (born 1980), New Zealand former cricketer
- Emmanuel Lobb (1594–1671), English Jesuit and dramatist
- Les Lobb (1894–1970)
- Rory Lobb (born 1995), professional Australian rules footballer
- Theophilus Lobb (1678–1763), English physician
- Olinthus Lobb, pen name of Louisa Parr (1848 – 1903), British writer

== Other ==
- Lobb, Kentucky

== See also ==
- Lob (disambiguation)
