= USS Beatty =

USS Beatty may refer to the following ships of the United States Navy:

- USS Beatty (DD-640), a Gleaves-class destroyer which served from 1942 until she was torpedoed off Algeria by German planes in 1943.
- USS Beatty (DD-756), an Allen M. Sumner-class destroyer which served from 1945 until 1972.
