= E. Polwhele =

British playwright

- Born: c. 1651
- Died: c. 1691
- Occupation: Playwright
- Spouse: Stephen Lobb ?
- Relatives: Theophilus Polwhele (father?)
- Writing career
- Language: English
- Notable works: The Frolicks, or, The Lawyer Cheated (1671)

E. Polwhele (Note: Her first name is possibly Elizabeth, though it is currently under debate.) (or Polewheele; later Lobb?; c. 1651 – c. 1691) was a playwright that became one of the first women to write for the professional stage in Restoration London.

== Life and work ==
Little is known of Polwhele's life, though she has been tentatively identified as the daughter of nonconformist minister Theophilus Polwhele. That Elizabeth Polwhele was born in or around 1651, married another minister, Stephen Lobb, had five children, died in 1691, and is "probably" the playwright although the identification is "somewhat startling."

A more likely candidate is Ellen Polewheel, baptised 21 Sep 1643 at Tettenhall, the daughter of William Polewheel (1606–1654) and granddaughter of Mary Fitton, the notorious maid of honour to Queen Elizabeth. The Fittons did have a history of literature and drama.

Another suggested identification is the "Mrs E. P." who died of smallpox sometime before February 1685 and about whom the poet John Tutchin wrote an elegy, describing her as his "best Friend".

There are records of Polwhele's having written three plays: Elysium, "possibly a religious masque," now lost; The Faythfull Virgins, a tragedy in rhyme; and The Frolicks, a comedy. These latter plays exist only in manuscript. There is also "probably a eulogistic poem."

The Faythfull Virgins was likely performed at Lincoln's Inn Fields about 1670.

The Frolicks was possibly performed by the Duke's Company in 1671 at the new Dorset Garden Theatre; it features Clarabell, a witty Restoration heroine, and Rightwit, a rake. It was dedicated to Prince Rupert and signed "E. Polewheele". In the dedication she mentions performance of both her earlier plays, and continues, "I am young, no scholar, and what I write I write by nature, not by art."

Along with Aphra Behn and Frances Boothby, Polewheele was one of the first women to write for the professional stage in the early Restoration period.

== The Frolicks, or The Lawyer Cheated ==
Written in or about 1671, the play existed solely in manuscript form until it was edited and published in a scholarly edition by Cornell University Press in 1977.

=== Manuscript ===
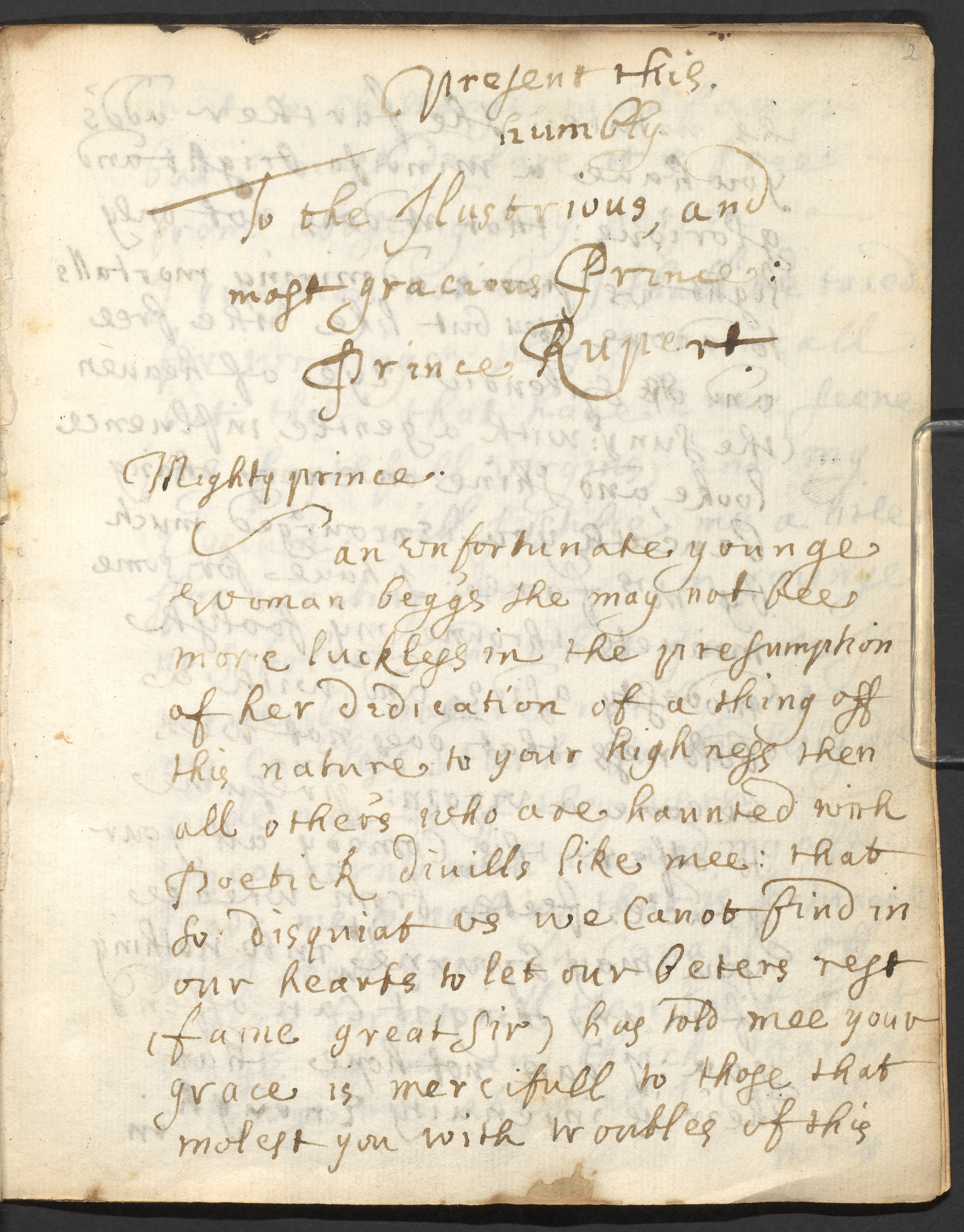
E. Polwhele. The frolicks: dedicatory letter from Polwhele to Prince Rupert, page 1. 1671.

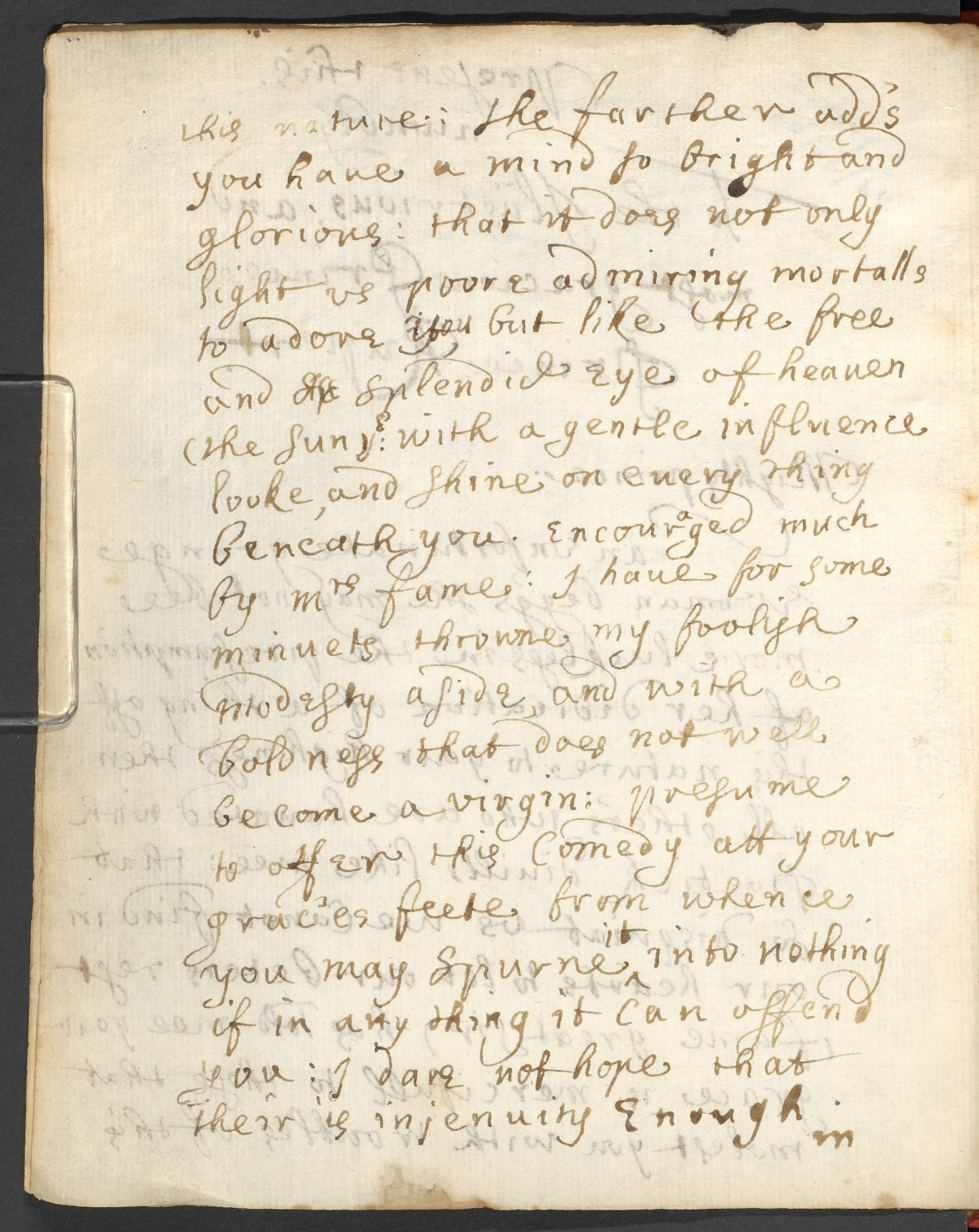
E. Polwhele. The frolicks: dedicatory letter from Polwhele to Prince Rupert, page 2. 1671.

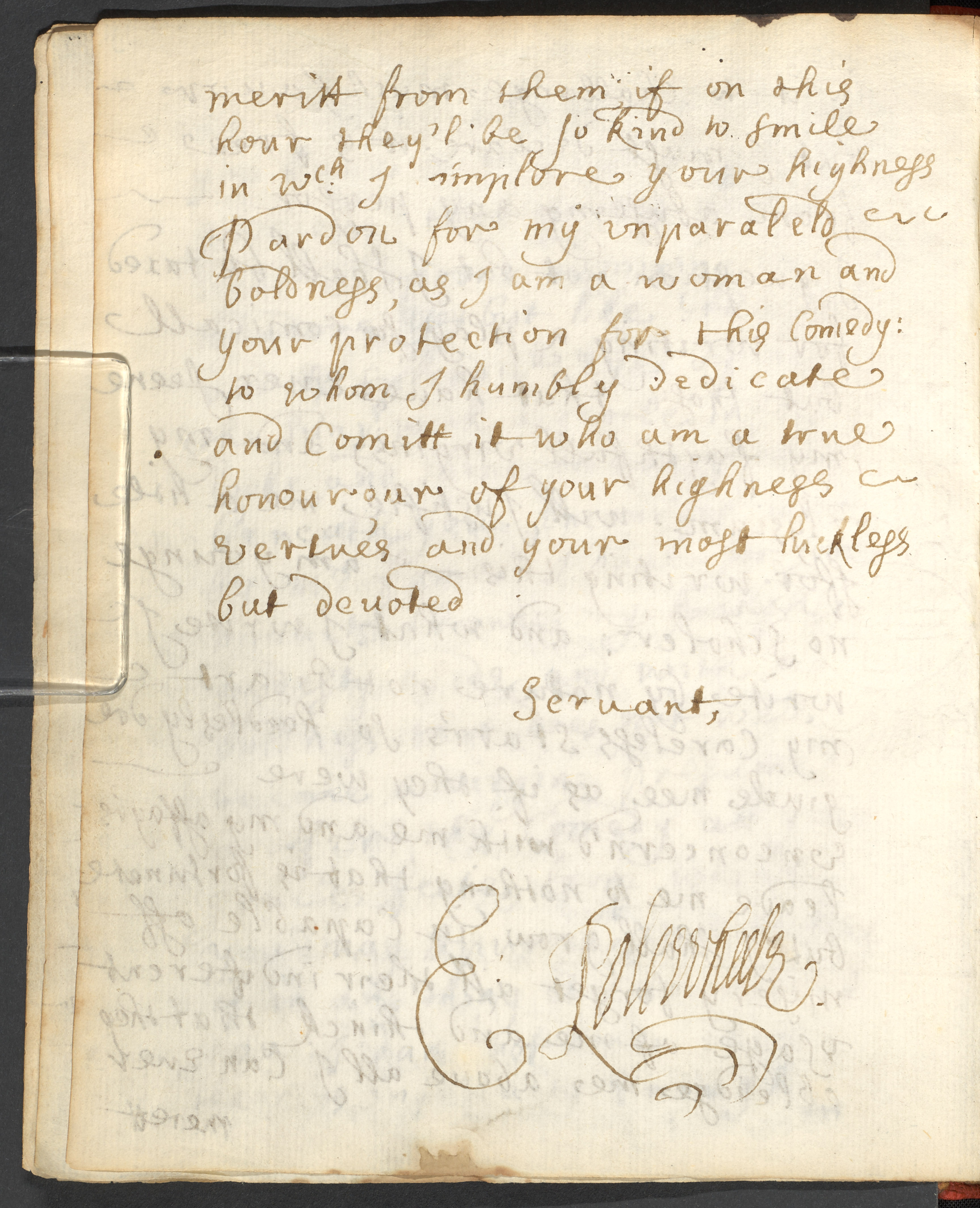
E. Polwhele. The frolicks: dedicatory letter from Polwhele to Prince Rupert, page 4. 1671.

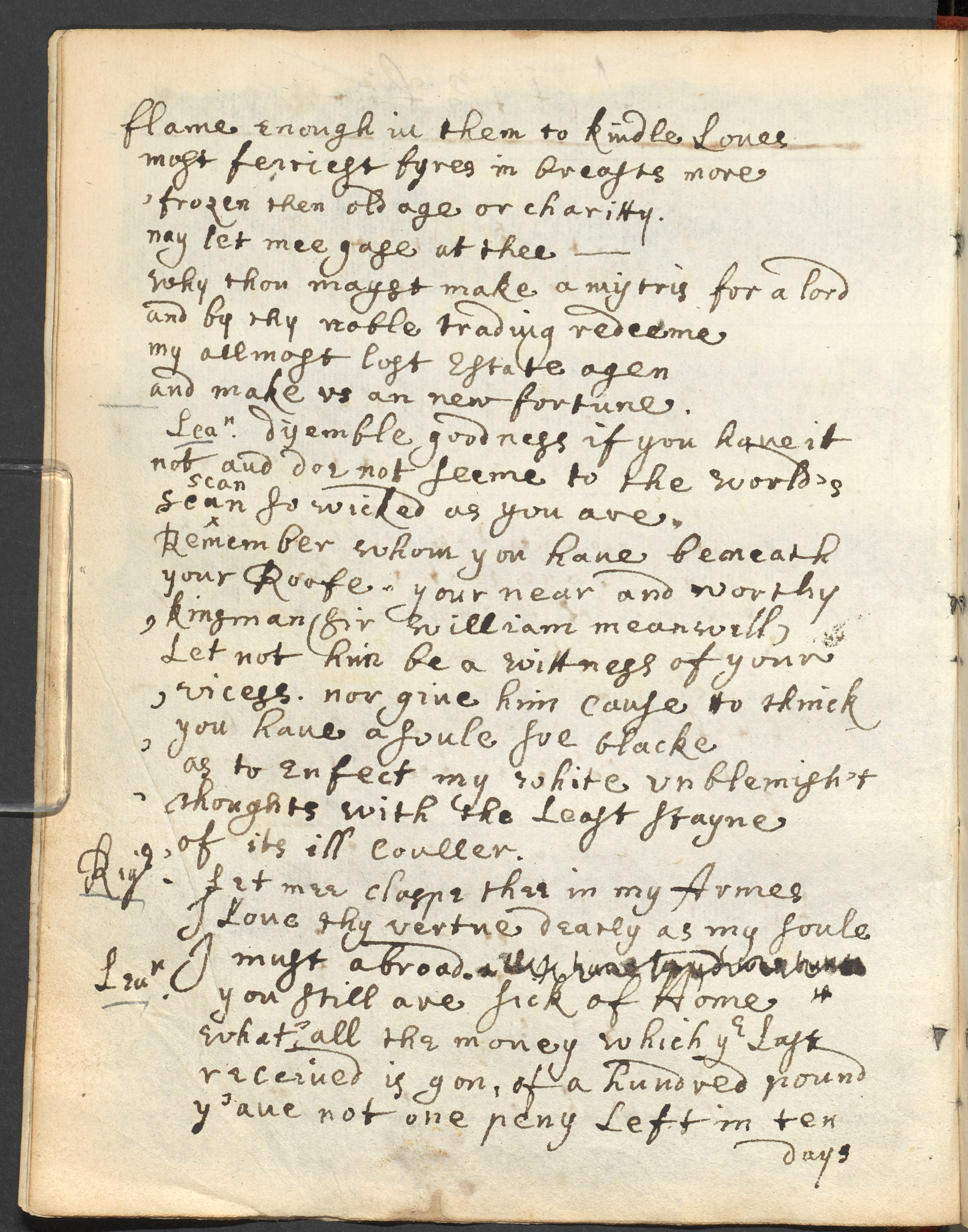
E. Polwhele. The frolicks: playscript, page 2. 1671.

=== First production ===
On October 11–12, 2021, second year students of the Shakespeare and Performance program at Mary Baldwin University in Staunton, Virginia premiered the first confirmed full length production of The Frolicks. The show was produced by the program and directed by Sara Hymes and Gregory Jon Phelps, two members of the Hedgepig Ensemble located in Brooklyn, New York. Hedgepig worked closely with the production's publicity team as the play was selected for Hedgepig's 2021 "Expand the Canon" list.

==== Cast ====
- Andrew Steven Knight as Rightwit
- Rosemary Richards as Clarabell
- Kelsey Linberg as Leonora/Philario
- Cole Metz as Mr. Zany
- Chase D. Fowler as Sir Gregory
- Kara Hankard as Plainman/Mistress
- Gil Mitchel as Speak
- Beth Somerville as Swallow
- Kelsey Harrison as Mark
- Madison Mayberry as Sir Makelove
- George Durfee as Lord Courtall
- Kailey Potter as Lady Meanwell
- Cameron Taylor as Sir Meanwell
- Sam Corey as Ralph
- Madison Rudolph as Procreate/Drawer
- Ariel Tatum as Faith/Turnkey/Constable

== Plays ==
- Elysium (lost)
- The Faythfull Virgins (ca. 1670; manuscript)
- The Frolicks; or, The Lawyer Cheated (1671)

== Sources ==
- Brown, Susan, et al. "Elizabeth Polwhele." Orlando: Women’s Writing in the British Isles from the Beginnings to the Present. Ed. Susan Brown, Patricia Clements, and Isobel Grundy. Cambridge University Press. Cambridge UP, n.d. 22 Mar. 2013. Accessed 21 Sept. 2022.
- Milhous, Judith. "Polewheele, E.". Oxford Dictionary of National Biography (online ed.). Oxford University Press. doi:10.1093/ref:odnb/45820. (Subscription, Wikipedia Library access or UK public library membership required.)
- Polewhele, Elizabeth. The Frolicks; or, The Lawyer Cheated. 1671. Eds. Judith Milhous and Robert D. Hume. Ithaca, [N.Y.]: Cornell University Press, 1977. ISBN 0801410304 (Open access, Internet Archive)
- Todd, Janet. "Elizabeth Polwhele." A Dictionary of British and American women writers, 1660-1800. Totowa, N.J.: Rowman & Allanheld, 1985, p. 259. (Open access, Internet Archive)
- Wynne-Davies, Marion. "Polwhele, Elizabeth (?1651-1691) English Restoration dramatist." Dictionary of English Literature, Bloomsbury, 1997.
