= Hiscock Site =

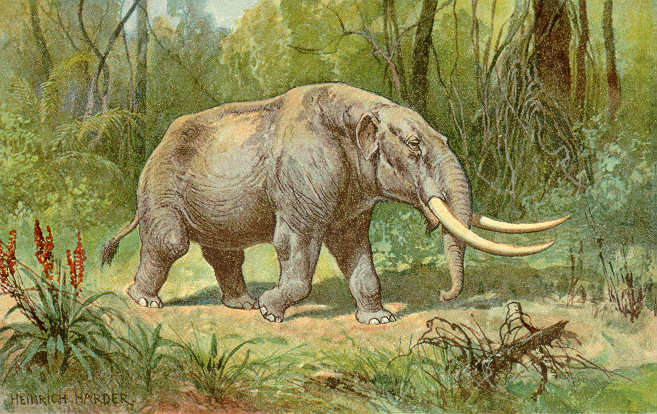
Mastodons roamed North America from the Tertiary period until about 10,000 years ago (Painting by Heinrich Harder ca. 1920)

The Hiscock Site is an archaeological and paleobiological site in Byron, New York, United States that has yielded many mastodon and paleo-Indian artifacts, as well as the remains of flora and fauna not previously known to have inhabited Western New York during the late Pleistocene. Now owned by the Buffalo Museum of Science, it has been studied by archeological excavation and analysis since 1983.

== History ==
=== Prehistoric 10,000 years ago ===
Around 10,000 years ago, the site was covered by Lake Tonawanda, which was formed by runoff from the melting and receding glaciers.

=== Accidental discovery 1959 ===
In 1959 the Hiscock family, for which the site is named, were using a backhoe to deepen a pond. Their backhoe ripped a large tusk out of the ground. The Hiscocks contacted the Buffalo Museum of Science about the site. For a time, it did not have the resources to mount an archeological excavation.

=== Excavations since 1983 ===
The first excavations of the site began in 1983 and yielded surprising specimens. Dr. Richard Laub, curator at the Buffalo Museum, formally introduced the site to the world in 1986. In 1989, the Hiscock family donated 10 acres of the site to the Buffalo Museum of Science for research. The site has been excavated seasonally since 1983. More than 200 international volunteers have worked at the site, in addition to American researchers and students.

== Important finds ==
=== Prehistoric Mastodons ===
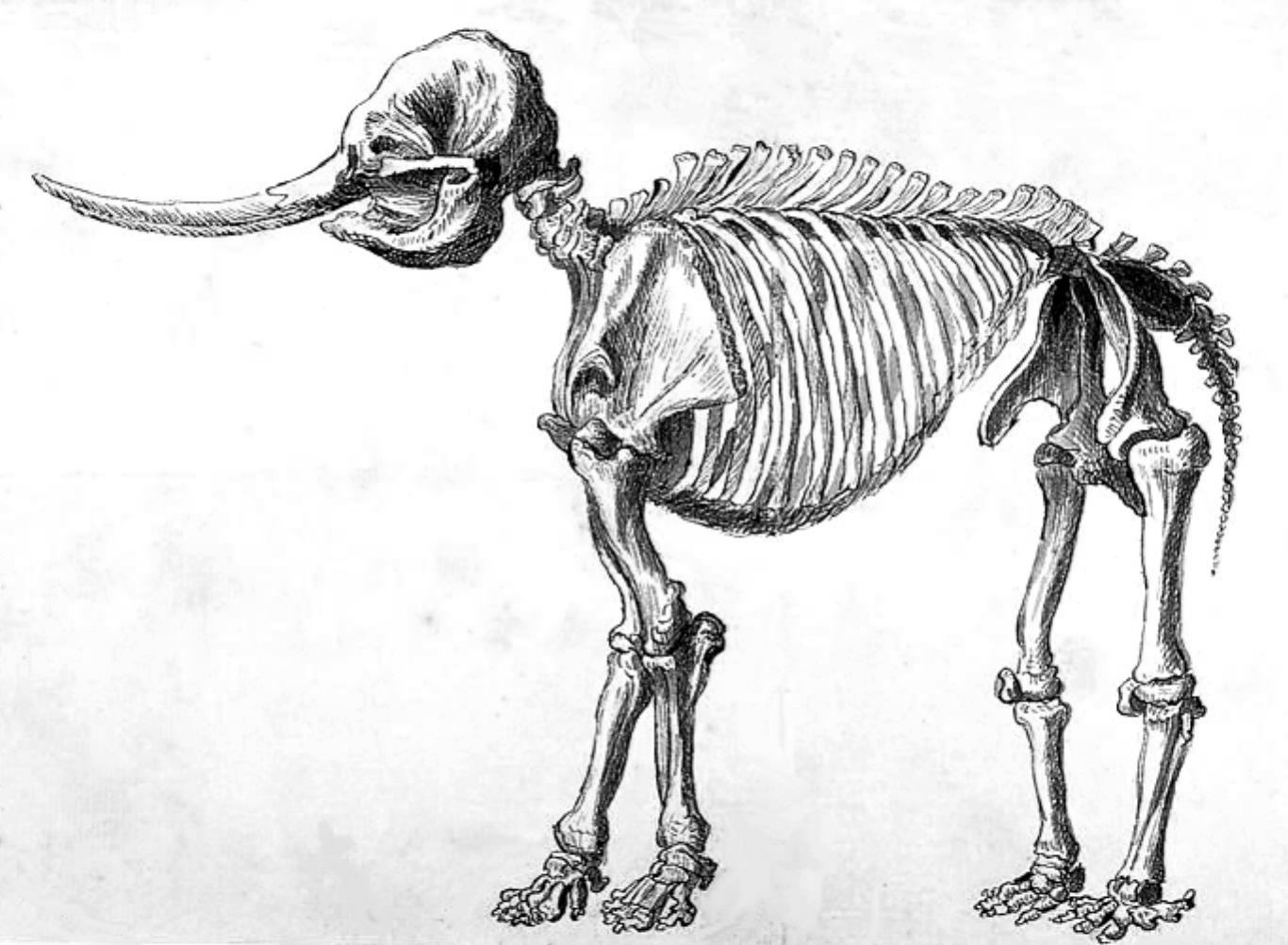
Drawing of a mastodon skeleton by Rembrandt Peale, c. 1801

Mastodons are members of the prehistoric, extinct genus Mammut; they resemble modern elephants.

Native to North America, mastodons lived on the continent from almost 4 million years ago, in the Tertiary period, until their eventual disappearance about 10,000 years ago. Mastodons also lived in Europe, from about five million years ago, but died out much earlier, 2 to 3 million years ago.

=== Mastodon fragments ===
Mastodon fragments such as large tusks, tusk tips, ivory, ankle bone, teeth, skull, and neural spine have been discovered in the excavations. More than 13 tusks have been found at the site. Analysis of the mastodon tusk tips has shown that the mastodons used their tusks to dig up sodium-rich clay during the last great paleo-drought.

=== Paleo-Indian artifacts ===
Evidence of paleo-Indians has also been discovered at the site, with flint knappings, stone tools and fluted projectile point. These were bound to sticks and lances for hunting.

== See also ==
- Richard Laub
