= USS Mervine (DD-489) =

Gleaves-class destroyer

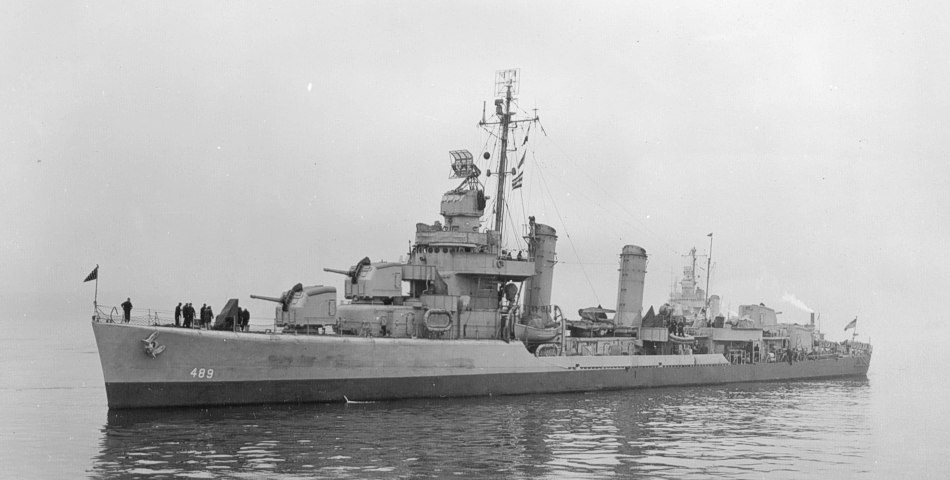
- USS Mervine (DD-489)

History

United States
- Name: Mervine
- Namesake: William Mervine
- Builder: Federal Shipbuilding and Drydock Company
- Laid down: 3 November 1941
- Launched: 3 May 1942
- Commissioned: 17 June 1942
- Identification: DD-489
- Reclassified: DMS-31, 30 May 1945
- Decommissioned: 27 May 1949
- Stricken: 31 July 1968
- Fate: Sold 27 October 1969 and broken up for scrap

General characteristics
- Class & type: Gleaves-class destroyer
- Displacement: 1,630 tons
- Length: 348 ft 4 in (106.17 m)
- Beam: 36 ft (11 m)
- Draft: 17 ft 5 in (5.31 m)
- Propulsion: 50,000 shp (37,000 kW); Westinghouse geared turbines; 2 propellers
- Speed: over 30 kn (56 km/h; 35 mph)
- Range: 6,500 nmi (12,000 km; 7,500 mi) at 12 kn (22 km/h; 14 mph)
- Complement: 271
- Armament: 4 × 5 in (127 mm) DP guns, 4 × 40 mm AA guns (2×2), 2 × 20 mm AA guns, 5 × 21 in (533 mm) torpedo tubes, 6 × depth charge projectors, 2 × depth charge tracks

USS Mervine (DD-489/DMS-31), a Gleaves-class destroyer, was the second ship of the United States Navy to be named for Rear Admiral William Mervine, who served during the War of 1812, the Mexican–American War and the American Civil War. Mervine was laid down on 3 November 1941 by the Federal Shipbuilding & Dry Dock Company of Kearny, New Jersey and launched on 3 May 1942, sponsored by Miss Mildred Mervine great-granddaughter of the admiral. The ship was commissioned on 17 June 1942.

== History ==
Following a shakedown cruise off Cuba, Mervine reported for duty with the Gulf Sea Frontier at New Orleans, 30 August 1942. Assigned to escort work, she accompanied merchantmen as they plied the Gulf and West Indian shipping lanes, which during the preceding months had gained the dubious distinction of suffering the heaviest losses to U-boat activity in the eastern Atlantic.

In October Mervine left the gulf and steamed to Norfolk where she Joined Task Force 34 (TF 34) and sailed east. Toward midnight on 7 November she arrived off Safi, Morocco, and took up her station for Operation TORCH the invasion of North Africa. During the landings on 8 November, she acted as control vessel and provided fire support for the assault forces on Red Beach, north of Safi. She remained on patrol in the area for the next five days and then returned to New York. There she resumed escort assignments and for the next seven months guarded coastal and transatlantic convoys.

On 8 June 1943 Mervine departed with TF 65 for North Africa. Arriving at Mers-el-Kebir on 22 June, she joined TF 85 and on 5 July departed for Sicily and Operation HUSKY. From 10 July through 13 July, she cruised off Scoglitti and along the coast of the Camerina Plain, providing fire support for the 7th Army's assault troops. She then returned to escort work in the North Atlantic and the Mediterranean.

In late October 1943 the troopships of convoy KMF25 left Liverpool bound for Alexandria. Mervine was the escort flagship when the convoy was attacked by German bombers off the coast of Algeria on 6 November 1943; and rescued over 600 survivors, including 100 nurses, from two ships sunk by the attack. Without facilities for so many passengers, Mervine transported the survivors to Malta within 24 hours.

=== Pacific Theater ===
In the spring of 1945, as Allied forces in the Pacific pushed closer to the Japanese home islands and their need for minesweepers increased—doubly so with the disastrous toll among that type ship in the Ryukyus—Mervine was designated for conversion. On 23 May she entered the Philadelphia Navy Yard where she became a destroyer minesweeper. Reclassified as DMS-31 on 30 May 1945, she departed for Norfolk on 15 July, and continued on to the Pacific. En route at the time of the Japanese surrender she arrived at Buckner Bay, Okinawa, on 28 September. In October, she swept mines off the China coast near Kokuzan. Shifting to Japanese waters the following month, she operated first off Kyūshū and then off Honshū.

=== Post war ===
Mervine reported to San Francisco on 31 March 1946 for two years of west coast operations before returning to the Far East. On 25 March 1948 she arrived at Yokosuka and continued on to Tsingtao, China, where she carried out escort, rescue, and training assignments until 5 October when she departed for the United States. Arriving at her homeport San Diego, in November, she soon departed again for training and availability at Pearl Harbor. On 15 February 1949 she returned to southern California for the last time. On 27 May she decommissioned and entered the Pacific Reserve Fleet at San Diego. Redesignated DD-489 again on 15 July 1955, she remained at San Diego until the end of the decade and then was transferred first to the Columbia River Reserve Group and finally to Bremerton. Struck on 31 July 1968 from the Navy list, she was sold for scrap in 1969.

== Awards ==
Mervine received three battle stars for her World War II service.
