= Theophilus Lobb =

English physician and minister (1678–1763)

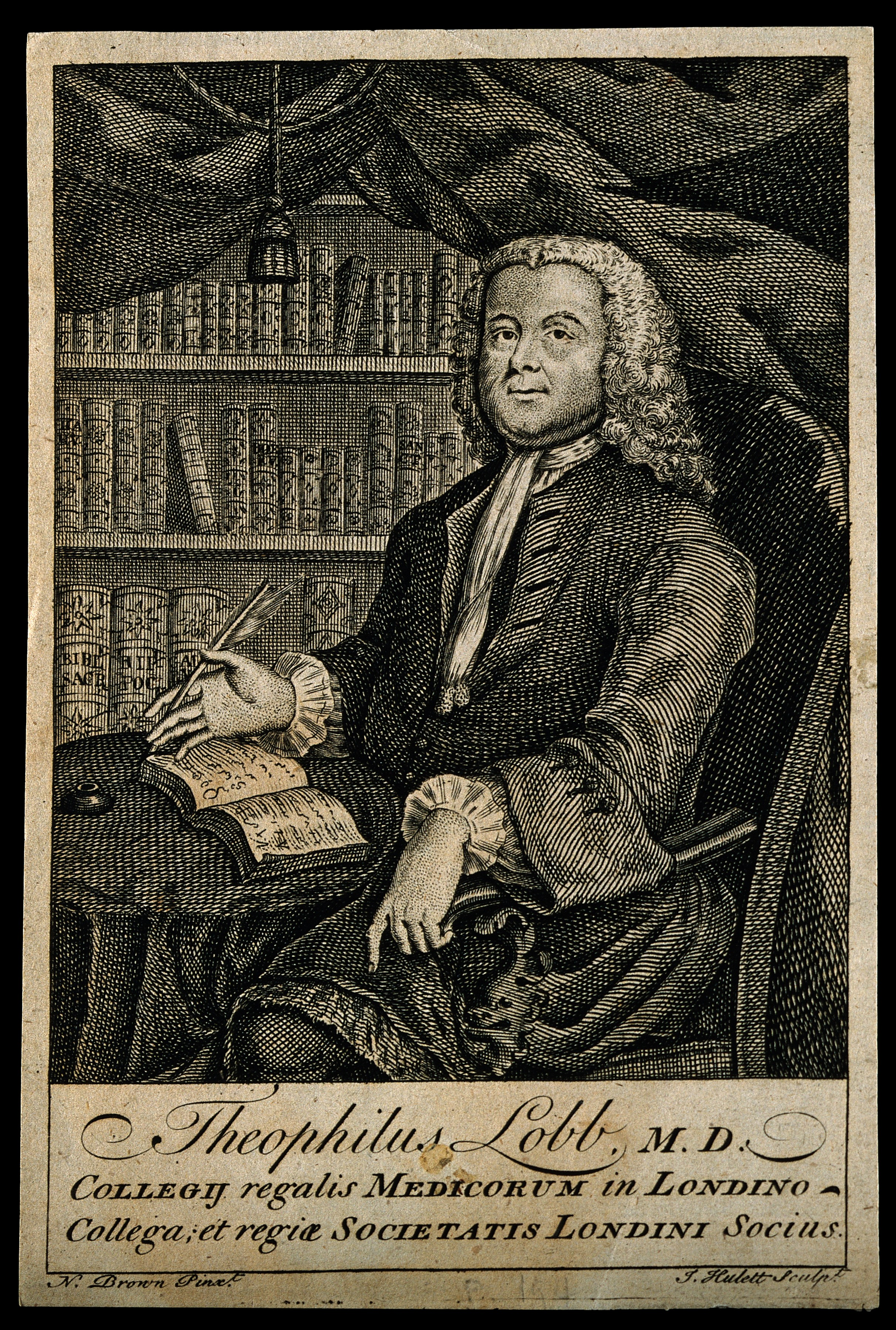
Theophilus Lobb, 1767 engraving

Theophilus Lobb (1678–1763) was an English physician, known as a medical and as a religious writer.

== Life ==
Born in London on 17 August 1678, he was the son of Stephen Lobb, by the daughter of Theophilus Polwhele, nonconformist minister at Tiverton in Devon. He was educated for the ministry under Thomas Goodwin the younger at Pinner, Middlesex. In 1702 he settled as a nonconformist minister at Guildford, Surrey, and there came to know a physician, from whom he received medical instruction.

About 1706 Lobb moved to Shaftesbury in Dorset, where he began to practise as a physician. In 1713 he settled at Yeovil, Somerset, and practised with success, while still continuing his ministry. Dissensions in his Yeovil congregation caused him in 1722 to move to Witham, Essex. On 20 June of that year he was created M.D. by the University of Glasgow, and he was admitted a Fellow of the Royal Society on 13 March 1729.

In 1732 Lobb received a call from the congregation at Haberdashers' Hall, London, but after his ministry had failed to prove acceptable he concentrated to physic from about 1736. On 30 September 1740 he was admitted a licentiate of the Royal College of Physicians, and practised thenceforth in London. On 21 May 1762 a patent was granted to him "for a tincture to preserve the blood from diziness, and a saline scorbutic acrimony".

Lobb died in the parish of Christ Church, London, on 19 May 1763, and was buried in Bunhill Fields.

== Works ==
Lobb's religious writings included:

- A Brief Defence of the Christian Religion; or, the Testimony of God to the Truth of the Christian Religion, London, 1726.
- Sacred Declarations; or, a Letter to the Inhabitants of London, Westminster, and all other parts of Great Britain on the account of those Sins which provoked God to send and continue the Mortal Sickness among the Cattle, and to signify by the late awful Earthquakes that His Anger is not turned away [anon.], London, 1750.
- Letters on the Sacred Predictions (with a letter on the public reading of the Scriptures), London, 1761.
- An Answer to the Question, whether it be lawful to go to Plays.
- A Dialogue between a Master and his Servants concerning the Sin of Lying.

His medical works were:

- A Treatise of the Small-pox. In two parts, London, 1731.
- Rational Methods of Curing Fevers, London, 1734.
- Medical Practice in curing Fevers; correspondent to rational methods, London, 1735.
- A Treatise on Dissolvents of the Stone, and on Curing the Stone and Gout by Aliment, London, 1739.
- A Practical Treatise of Painful Distempers. With some … Methods of Curing them, London, 1739.
- An Address to the Faculty on Miss Stephens's Medicaments, London, 1739.
- Letters concerning the Plague, shewing the means to preserve people from Infection, London, 1745.
- A Compendium of the Practice of Physick … in Twenty-four Lectures … With a Letter shewing what is the proper preparation of persons for Inoculation, London, 1747.
- The Good Samaritan, or Complete English Physician, London (1750?).
- Medical Principles and Cautions, 3 pts., London, 1751–3.
- General Medical Principles and Cautions, in three parts, London, 1753.
- Medicinal Letters. In two parts, London, 1763; 3rd edit. 1765.
- The Practice of Physic in general, as delivered in a Course of Lectures on the Theory of Diseases, and the proper method of treating them. Published from the Doctor's own MS., 2 vols. London, 1771.

In 1767 Lobb's brother-in-law, the Rev. John Greene of Chelmsford, Essex, published The Power of Faith and Godliness exemplified in some Memoirs of Theophilus Lobb. It consisted mainly of extracts from Lobb's diary.

== Family ==
Lobb married, first, Frances (died 1722), daughter of James Cooke, physician, of Shepton Mallet, Somerset; and secondly, in 1723, a lady who died on 2 February 1760. He left no issue, and willed the profits from his tincture to his niece, Elizabeth Buckland.

== Notes ==
Attribution

This article incorporates text from a publication now in the public domain: Lee, Sidney, ed. (1893). "Lobb, Theophilus". Dictionary of National Biography. Vol. 34. London: Smith, Elder & Co.
