= Cap Bougaroûn =

Cape in Algeria

Cap Bougaroûn Cape Bougaroun
- Cape
- Algeria
- Coordinates: 37°05′16″N 6°28′03″E

Cap Bougaroûn (Arabic: رأس بوقارون Ras Bougaroun "Cap the Horns" or "Horned Cap") or the Seven Caps (Arabic Seba Rous) is a cape in Algeria in Skikda Province.

The Cape constitutes the western end of the Gulf of Skikda, opposite Cap de Fer, and forms a peninsula which is the most important of the Algerian coast. It is the northernmost point of Algeria.

In the first century, it was named Cape Treton (Greek Τρητόν "Chiseled") in the Geography of Strabo. It marked the limit between the Masaesyli in the west and the Massylii in the east.

The November 6, 1943, the Luftwaffe conducted the Action off Cape Bougaroun on Convoy KMF-25A composed of 26 transport ships escorted by 15 Allied warships, in which six ships were sunk and six German planes were shot down.
