= USS Beatty (DD-756) =

Allen M. Sumner-class destroyer

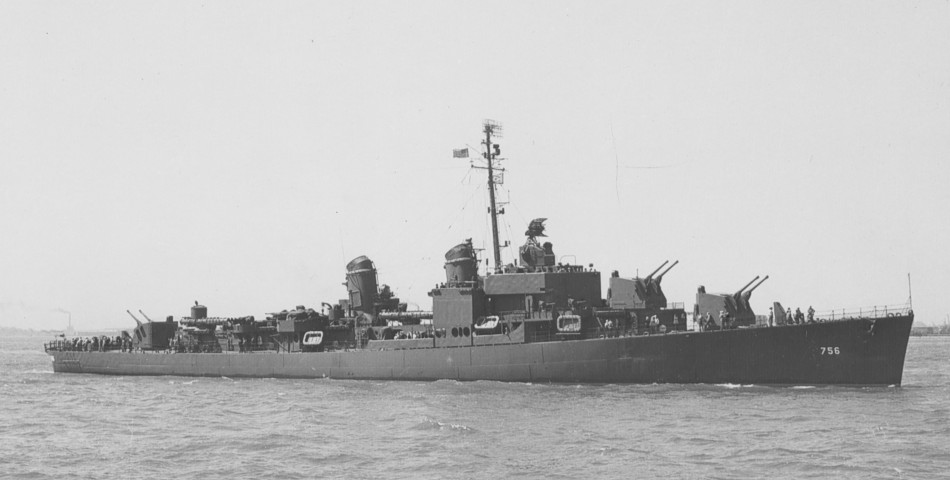
- USS Beatty

History

United States
- Name: Beatty
- Namesake: Frank Beatty
- Builder: Bethlehem Mariners Harbor, Staten Island, New York
- Laid down: 4 July 1944
- Launched: 30 November 1944
- Commissioned: 31 March 1945
- Decommissioned: 14 July 1972
- Stricken: 14 July 1972
- Fate: To Venezuela 14 July 1972

Venezuela
- Name: Carabobo
- Acquired: 14 July 1972
- Stricken: 1981
- Fate: Stricken and scrapped in 1981.

General characteristics
- Class & type: Allen M. Sumner-class destroyer
- Displacement: 2,200 tons
- Length: 376 ft 6 in (114.76 m)
- Beam: 40 ft (12 m)
- Draft: 15 ft 8 in (4.78 m)
- Propulsion: 60,000 shp (45,000 kW); 2 propellers
- Speed: 34 knots (63 km/h; 39 mph)
- Range: 6,500 nmi (12,000 km; 7,500 mi) at 15 kn (28 km/h; 17 mph)
- Complement: 336
- Armament: 6 × 5 in (127 mm)/38 cal. guns, 12 × 40 mm AA guns, 11 × 20 mm AA guns, 10 × 21 inch (533 mm) torpedo tubes, 6 × depth charge projectors, 2 × depth charge tracks

USS Beatty (DD-756), an Allen M. Sumner-class destroyer, was the second ship of the United States Navy to be named for Admiral Frank Beatty.

The second Beatty (DD-756) was launched on 30 November 1944 by Bethlehem Steel Co., Staten Island, New York; sponsored by Mrs. Charles H. Drayton, daughter, and Miss Mary Drayton, granddaughter of Admiral Beatty; and commissioned on 31 March 1945.

== History ==
Beatty reported to Commander, Operational Training Command, Atlantic Fleet, 22 June 1945 for duty as a training ship. She operated in Chesapeake Bay and made one cruise to the Caribbean between June and November. On 10 November 1945 she departed Norfolk, Virginia for the Pacific, arriving at San Diego on 25 November. She remained on the west coast until the end of March 1946 when she rejoined the Atlantic Fleet.

Between February and August 1947 Beatty cruised in Northern European waters. She conducted her first tour in the Mediterranean between September 1948 and January 1949. While in the Mediterranean she served on patrol duty, based at Haifa, Israel, during the Arab-Israeli dispute. Retiring to the east coast Beatty operated out of Melville and Newport, Rhode Island, along the eastern seaboard, and in the Caribbean and Gulf of Mexico until March 1951 when she returned to the Mediterranean. This cruise lasted until June.

On 2 October 1951 Beatty departed Newport for Yokosuka, Japan, via the Panama Canal. Upon arrival 31 October 1951, she joined Task Force 77 for patrol and blockade duty off the east coast of Korea. During November she participated in shore bombardments of Wonsan, Chongjin, Songjin, and Tanchon. On 15 February she again bombarded targets at Wonsan. On 27 February 1952 she departed Yokosuka. Sailing via Hong Kong, Singapore, and Colombo, Ceylon, she transited the Suez Canal for a brief tour of the Mediterranean. She departed Cannes, France, 12 April and arrived at Newport 21 April 1952.

Beatty remained active with the Atlantic Fleet. She made several tours of the Mediterranean, as a unit of the 6th Fleet, and conducted local operations, type training, and training cruises along the eastern seaboard and in the Caribbean.

Beatty received two battle stars for her Korean service.
