= Powles =

Powles is a surname. Notable people with the name include:

- Edward Powles (1921–2008), English Royal Air Force pilot
- Charles Guy Powles (1872–1951), New Zealand soldier
- Guy Powles (1905–1994), New Zealand diplomat
- John Powles (1948–2010), Canadian president of the Canada-Japan Society
- John Diston Powles (c.1787–1867), English businessman
- Lewis Charles Powles (1860–1942), English painter
- Michele Powles (born 1976), New Zealand novelist, playwright, and non-fiction writer
- Nina Mingya Powles (born 1993), New Zealand poet and essayist
- Ray Powles (born 1938), British physician
- Sophie Powles (born 1988), English actress
- Stephen Powles (born 1950), Australian plant scientist
- Tim Powles (born 1959), New Zealand music producer and artist

== See also ==
- Powle
