= USS Laub (DD-263) =

Clemson-class destroyer

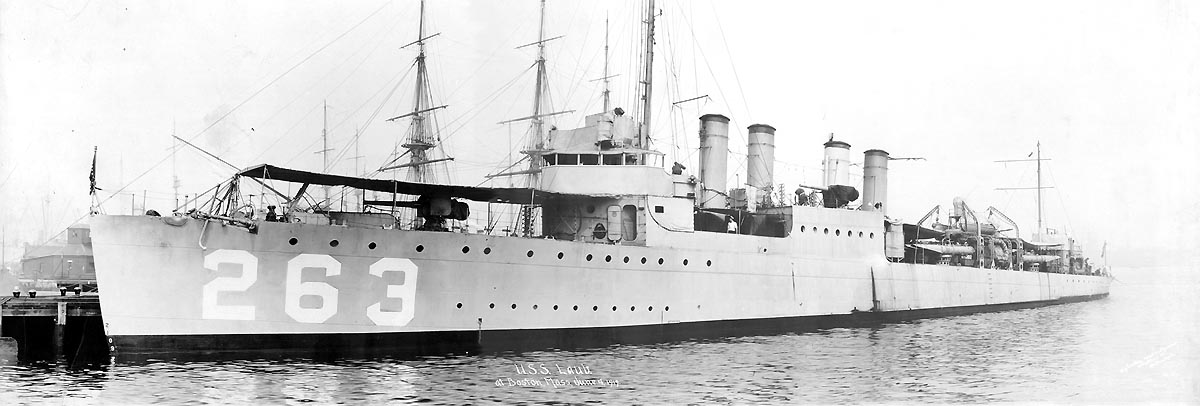
- USS Laub

History

United States
- Name: USS Laub
- Namesake: Henry Laub
- Builder: Bethlehem Shipbuilding Corporation, Squantum Victory Yard
- Laid down: 20 April 1918
- Launched: 28 August 1918
- Commissioned: 17 March 1919
- Decommissioned: 8 October 1940
- Stricken: 8 January 1942
- Identification: DD-263
- Fate: Transferred to the United Kingdom, 8 October 1940

United Kingdom
- Name: HMS Burwell
- Acquired: 8 October 1940
- Identification: Pennant number: H94
- Fate: Sold for scrap, March 1947

General characteristics
- Class & type: Clemson-class destroyer
- Displacement: 1,190 tons
- Length: 314 ft 5 in (95.83 m)
- Beam: 31 ft 8 in (9.65 m)
- Draft: 9 ft 3 in (2.82 m)
- Propulsion: 26,500 shp (19,800 kW); geared turbines, 2 screws
- Speed: 35 kn (65 km/h; 40 mph)
- Range: 4,900 nmi (9,100 km; 5,600 mi) at 15 kn (28 km/h; 17 mph)
- Complement: 120 officers and enlisted
- Armament: 4 × 4 in (100 mm) guns; 2 × 3 in (76 mm) guns; 12 × 21 inch (533 mm) torpedo tubes

The first USS Laub (DD-263) was a Clemson-class destroyer in the United States Navy and transferred to the Royal Navy where she served as HMS Burwell (H94) during World War II. She was named for Henry Laub.

== As USS Laub ==
Laub was laid down by Bethlehem Shipbuilding Corporation, Squantum, Massachusetts, on 20 April 1918. The destroyer was launched on 28 August 1918, sponsored by Miss Marjorie Mohan, a collateral descendant of Henry Laub. The ship was commissioned on 17 March 1919.

Assigned to the Atlantic destroyer force out of Newport, Rhode Island, Laub was dispatched 2 to 17 May 1919 to take up position off Newfoundland as plane guard, and navigational aid during the NC-4 transatlantic flight. The destroyer continued exercises off the east coast until 30 June when she sailed for European service. Arriving Brest 17 July, Laub operated with the fleet off Western Europe until she sailed late in August for duty in the eastern Mediterranean. Upon arrival at Constantinople 2 September, Laub operated with the Food Commission, bringing relief to Europe. She sailed for America on the 17th, arriving New York City 4 October. Her stay on the east coast was a brief one as she sailed 2 weeks later to join the Pacific Fleet, arriving San Diego, California 27 November.

From December 1919 until she decommissioned 15 June 1922, Laub performed torpedo experiments and reserve training cruises along the Pacific coast.

Laub recommissioned 18 December 1939. After shakedown out of San Diego, the destroyer arrived Guantanamo 7 April 1940 to join the Caribbean Neutrality patrol. Following 2 months' duty out of Guantanamo, she sailed to Galveston, Texas, for patrol operations in the Gulf of Mexico. Following 4 months of operations in the gulf and along the Atlantic coast, Laub arrived at Halifax, Nova Scotia, 5 September. She decommissioned there 8 October 1940.

== As HMS Burwell ==
Laub was transferred to Great Britain the following day as part of the destroyer-bases agreement. During World War II she served in the Royal Navy protecting Allied shipping in the North Atlantic under the name HMS Burwell. As Burwell was modified for trade convoy escort service by removal of three of the original 4"/50 caliber guns and one of the triple torpedo tube mounts to reduce topside weight for additional depth charge stowage and installation of Hedgehog. In this role Burwell was engaged in all the duties performed by escort ships; protecting convoys, searching for and attacking U-boats which attacked ships in convoy, and rescuing survivors.

In sixteen months service Burwell escorted 24 Atlantic and three Gibraltar convoys, of which seven were attacked, and she was involved in two major convoy battles; around SC 52 in November 1941 and KMS 10 in March 1943. A notable incident during this period was her involvement in the capture of the German U-boat U-570 in August 1941.

In October 1943 Burwell was withdrawn to the Reserve and converted to an Air target Ship. She continued in this function until January 1945 when she was withdrawn completely and laid up. In March 1947 Burwell was sold for scrap.
