= USS Laub =

USS Laub may refer to the following ships of the United States Navy:

- USS Laub (DD-263), a Clemson-class destroyer commissioned in 1919 and transferred to the Royal Navy in 1940 as HMS Burwell
- USS Laub (DD-613), a Benson-class destroyer commissioned in 1942 and decommissioned in 1946
