= USS Beatty (DD-640) =

Gleaves-class destroyer

Coordinates: 37°10′N 6°0′E

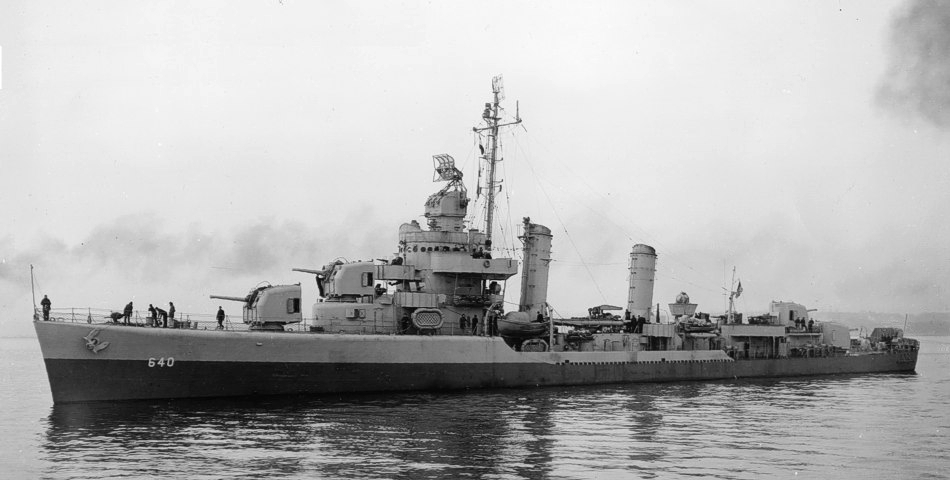
- Beatty off the coast of New York, 1943

History

United States
- Name: Beatty
- Namesake: Frank E. Beatty
- Builder: Charleston Navy Yard
- Laid down: 1 May 1941
- Launched: 20 December 1941
- Commissioned: 7 May 1942
- Fate: Sunk by German aircraft, off Algeria, 6 November 1943

General characteristics
- Class & type: Gleaves-class destroyer
- Displacement: 2,060 tons
- Length: 348 ft 3 in (106.15 m)
- Beam: 36 ft 1 in (11.00 m)
- Draft: 11 ft 10 in (3.61 m)
- Propulsion: 50,000 shp (37,000 kW); 4 boilers; 2 propellers
- Speed: 37.4 knots (69 km/h)
- Range: 6,500 nmi (12,000 km; 7,500 mi) at 12 kn (22 km/h; 14 mph)
- Complement: 16 officers, 260 enlisted
- Armament: 4 × 5 in (127 mm)/ 38 caliber DP guns, 4 × Bofors 40 mm guns; 5 × Oerlikon 20 mm cannons; 5 × 21 in (533 mm) torpedo tubes (5 Mark 15 torpedoes), 6 × depth charge projectors, 2 × depth charge tracks

USS Beatty (DD-640), a Gleaves-class destroyer, was the first ship of the United States Navy to be named for Rear Admiral Frank E. Beatty.

Beatty was laid down as Mullany on 1 May 1941 at the Charleston Navy Yard.

The name "Beatty" was originally assigned to a destroyer scheduled to be built in San Francisco, but the names of Mullany (DD-528) and DD-640 were switched on 28 May 1941 to accommodate Mrs. Charles H. Drayton, the daughter of the late Rear Admiral, who had asked that the ship honoring her father be built at the Charleston Navy Yard. Sponsored by Mrs. Drayton, Beatty was launched on 20 December 1941, and commissioned on 7 May 1942.

== Service history ==
=== 1942 ===
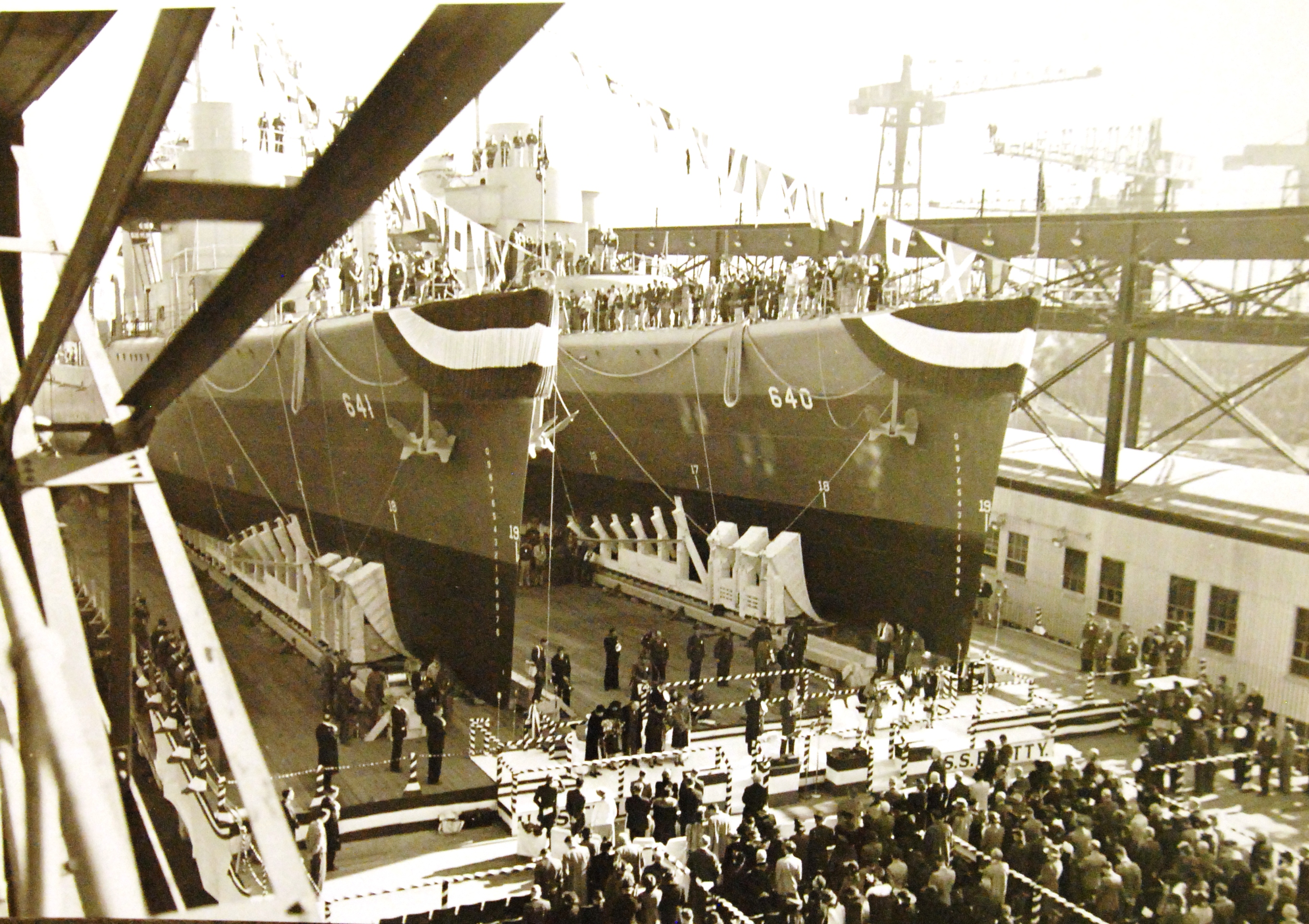
Dual launch of "Beatty" and Tillman

Following shakedown, Beatty escorted the Norwegian tanker Britainsea and Barstowe from the Isles of Shoals to Portland, Maine, on 8 August before she was detached for patrol duty and antisubmarine warfare (ASW) training. She next steamed to Boston to embark Admiral Royal E. Ingersoll, Commander in Chief, Atlantic Fleet, on 12 August. In company with Quick, the destroyer transported her high-ranking passenger to Halifax, Nova Scotia, and Argentia, Newfoundland, before disembarking him at Portland on 22 August. The destroyer then escorted Vixen, with Admiral Ingersoll aboard, from Portland to New London, Connecticut where she arrived on 23 August.

Beatty took part in exercises out of New London with friendly submarines until 25 August and then sailed south to Charleston, South Carolina, for voyage repairs. After that, she steamed to the West Indies and the Gulf of Mexico, reaching Cristobal in the Panama Canal Zone on 10 September. There, she joined Convoy NC-5, four Army transports which got underway for the British West Indies on 11 September. The warship shepherded her charges to Trinidad, and made port on 15 September.

Clearing Trinidad shortly before noon on 16 September, Beatty joined Davis and Eberle in an antisubmarine sweep near Tobago Island. At 1858, Eberle reported a submarine contact and carried out an attack, without achieving any definitive results. Beatty then rendezvoused with a convoy on 17 September, escorting it to a dispersal point off Georgetown, British Guiana, and then heading back to Trinidad. After shifting to San Juan, where she made port on the 23rd, Beatty sailed with Convoy NC-5, via Kingston, Jamaica, and Belize, Honduras, to New Orleans. Sailing for the east coast on 6 October, she reached the Charleston Navy Yard on 8 October to prepare for her next operation.

Underway again on 16 October 1942, Beatty sailed for Hampton Roads and there joined Task Group 34.10 (TG 34.10) – the Southern Attack Group assembling there for Operation Torch, the invasion of North Africa. This group was slated to assault Safi, French Morocco. Arriving off the North African shore on 7 November, TG 34.10 began preparations for landing early the following morning. Beatty joined the transport area's antisubmarine screen at midnight and patrolled south of Bernadou and Cole as they circled slowly, waiting for the order to land their troops at Safi.

Enjoying the element of surprise, Beatty proceeded toward the beach, staying on Bernadou's starboard quarter as she and Cole began their movement shoreward. At 0415, Beatty took her station along with other ships of the fire support group, and, at 0430, heard the prearranged code words "Play Ball." Uncertain as to the position of the assault groups, Beatty checked fire momentarily until intercepting a radio transmission that told of the assault wave's arrival at the line of departure. Assured that no friendly troops had yet landed in that sector, Beatty opened fire at 0431, continuing for ten minutes before checking fire to await instructions for fire support.

Beatty lost communication with the Army troops on shore, and by 0520 maneuvered seaward toward the transport area, to take station in a screen before sunrise. At 0640, she observed enemy fire from batteries at Point de la Tour, and saw some splashes close aboard and in the vicinity of the boat lane to the "Red" and "Blue" beaches. A minute later, Beatty fired at these guns, silenced them in 20 minutes. For the remainder of her participation in "Torch," Beatty served in the screen. She returned to the United States late in November and entered the New York Navy Yard for voyage repairs and alterations.

=== 1943 ===
For the next four months, Beatty covered convoys plying the Atlantic. During this period, she made three round-trip cycles. Ending the third cycle upon her arrival at New York on 28 April, Beatty underwent the usual voyage repairs and conducted type training before getting underway for Hampton Roads on 13 May. Reaching Norfolk the following day, she escorted Vixen, with Admiral Ingersoll embarked, to New York, arriving on 15 May. Further type training in the Chesapeake Bay area followed, before she stood out of Hampton Roads on 8 June, as part of the escort for fast Convoy UGF-9, bound for Algeria. She arrived at Mers-el-Kébir on 25 June 1943.

Patrolling, escorting, and training followed Beatty's arrival in the Mediterranean basin. On 5 July, the destroyer sailed for Sicily, assigned to the "Cent" attack force for the invasion of Sicily. Arriving off the transport area on 9 July, she observed antiaircraft fire in the skies over Sicily at 2240. The fire grew in intensity over Gela, Biscari, Vittoria, and Santa Croce Camerina. She observed several planes crashing around 2325, and a large fire burning to south of Biscari. Beatty screened the southeastern flank of the transport area until they anchored offshore in their assigned zone, and then took her station in her fire support area.

Led by PC-557 and Speed (AM-116), the first landing craft from Neville began nosing shoreward around 0342. Cowie lay on Speed's port beam, with Beatty 500 yards (460 m) off Cowie's port beam. At about 0407, Speed requested the destroyers to open fire. Beatty promptly complied, beginning with rapid fire and then slowing to eight rounds per gun per minute. Having observed no return fire, she ceased fire at 0416.

After the neutralization of the landing zone, Beatty returned to the transport area to take up screening duties and to await contact with her shore fire control party (SFCP). At 0830, SFCP-7A, attached to the 2nd Battalion of the Army's 180th Regimental Combat Team, informed Beatty that the landing had been successful.

During the forenoon, Beatty observed enemy planes appearing low and fast out of the Valle Forte, over Lagi di Biviere, and from the valley just west of the Fiume Acati, strafing ground troops, bombing the beaches and seemingly disappearing almost as soon as they were seen. The enemy planes "maintained their nuisance value the entire period of daylight," enjoying what almost amounted to immunity because "ships could not fire on them also without danger to (our) own forces." The enemy aircraft proved devastating to Allied spotting planes. Beatty observed four Reggiane Re.2001s gang up on and shoot down a SOC Seagull at 1021. At 1315, a Focke-Wulf Fw 190 downed another Seagull to the southeast of Scoglitti.

Beatty claimed some solid hits on one of the Re.2001s that had downed the first Seagull, observing it disappear over a nearby section of high ground. At 1046, a plane roared out of the "favorite valley" toward the ships. Beatty opened fire, pumping out 26 rounds from her Bofors 40 mm guns and 60 from her Oerlikon 20 mm cannons before the plane was seen to be a P-51 Mustang.

For the remainder of 10 July, Beatty remained off the invasion beaches. Shell fragments hit Beatty's main deck and port side when tank landing craft (LCTs) nearby fired on "friendly" planes at 1847. The threat of further air attacks prompted the destroyer to help lay a smoke screen over the LCTs.

The harassment continued after sunset. A heavy bomb landed about 500 yards astern of the ship, shaking her "considerably," while she observed a nearby dogfight. One of the antagonists shot the other down. The latter crashed in flames, starting a brush fire where it fell. Meanwhile, considerable gunfire from the beach and the ships offshore criss-crossed the night skies.

Enemy bombing raids ushered in the next day, 11 July, and Beatty fired at a Messerschmitt Bf 110 at 0651, after it had bombed Allied positions on "Dime" beach. At 0735, SFCP-7A requested Beatty to "stand by for target designation." After receiving the target coordinates, Beatty set to work at 0738, blasting a railroad and highway junction until 0811. Her shore party later informed her that the targets had been "tanks and bridges." In just over three hours, Beatty hurled 799 rounds at targets designated by her spotters, inflicting what she suspected was a considerable amount of damage on the enemy positions. When she left the beaches only 192 rounds remained.

When she was relieved by Laub at 1100, her crew had been at battle stations since 2024 on 9 July. Nevertheless, Beatty took station in the antisubmarine screen at 1140, and sent her men to general quarters several times during the afternoon due to air attacks on transport and beach areas. Near 1900, Beatty moved southeast of a minefield to await the formation of a convoy she had been directed to escort, and took up screening patrol south of Scoglitti, crossing the waters between Point della Camerina and Point Braccetto. At 2224, the enemy began dropping flares and bombs near Scoglitti. The flares cast their light over the ships offshore, marking them as targets.

About 2230, eight flares lit up the waters south of Point Braccetto, followed by two heavy bombs. Beatty stood towards the transport area around 2246 and detected the sound of an approaching aircraft. The plane made an unusual amount of noise as it approached the beaches at Scoglitti; the crew could hear it, but not see it. At almost the same time, Beatty suffered hits on her starboard side by what were believed to be machine gun bullets. Beatty's men suddenly noticed the plane pass across the ship's bow at about 40 feet (12 m), "missing the forecastle by a few feet", and turned down the port side of the ship, landing in the water next to the number two stack, about 50 feet (15 m) away. Beatty's 20 mm guns fired two bursts before the plane came to a stop in the swells alongside.

At that point, Beatty's sailors could see that the plane was a United States Army Air Forces C-47 Skytrain troop transport. Beatty ceased fire as six flares lit up the area. The destroyer then rang up flank speed as she pulled away from the sinking Skytrain.

Beatty's executive officer, Lieutenant Commander William Outerson, marked the charts with the American plane's position. After the flares had burned out, Beatty returned to the spot and found a rubber boat with all four members of the Skytrain's crew. The plane, attached to the 15th Troop Carrier Squadron, had endured quite an evening since leaving Malta with paratroops on board. She had been hit by gunfire from both friend and foe alike. The plane had disgorged her paratroops before she crash-landed at sea; her pilot, First Lieutenant P. J. Paccassi, USAAF, earned praise from Beatty's commanding officer for the skill with which he had landed his badly damaged aircraft. The large amount of noise Beatty's sailors had heard had been caused by one of the Skytrain's engines disintegrating.

Beatty remained on antisubmarine patrol until 2100 on 12 July, when she departed the Scoglitti area in the screen for a group of transports returning to Algeria. The warship arrived at Oran on 15 July. Underway for the United States on 21 July, Beatty escorted a convoy to New York where she arrived on 3 August. Following voyage repairs at the New York Navy Yard, she again sailed for the Mediterranean on 21 August.

Action soon followed her return to the Mediterranean. On 2 September, while part of the antisubmarine screen of Section II of Convoy UGF-10, bound for Bizerte, Tunisia, Beatty went to general quarters upon the report of enemy aircraft in the vicinity. None came near enough for Beatty to take them under fire, but one managed to torpedo Kendrick at around 2117. Almost immediately, Beatty closed the damaged destroyer and stood guard until relieved by Davison later that night.

While anchored off Bizerte four days later, Beatty received a red alert at 2030 and again went to general quarters. Intense antiaircraft fire commenced at 2050, directed toward what later evaluation considered to have been Junkers Ju 88s. Clearing Bizerte on 7 September, the destroyer joined up with a fast US bound convoy, GUF-10, the next day. Outside a submarine contact one day out, upon which Beatty dropped depth charges, the voyage homeward proved uneventful. She reached the New York Navy Yard on 21 September for voyage repairs.

=== Fate ===
Post availability trials and further antisubmarine training were completed by 7 October when Beatty embarked upon her last transatlantic crossing. She screened a convoy to Bangor, Northern Ireland, from 7 to 17 October, and then joined the screen for Convoy KMF-25A, en route to the Mediterranean. Making rendezvous on schedule, the destroyer took her station and proceeded into the Mediterranean. Convoy KMF-25A sailed deployed in three columns, with the escorts steaming in a protective circle around the troopships and merchantmen. Beatty was steaming in the rear of the formation at 1800 on 6 November 1943.

At general quarters, Beatty observed machine gun fire on the port side of the convoy at 1803. Many small pips appeared on her radar screen in the direction of Tillman, stationed on that side of the convoy. A minute after observing the gunfire, Beatty noted a large bomb explode close aboard her colleague, a glider bomb which had missed its target. Beatty's radar picked up five incoming aircraft, two of which passed the port side of the convoy, inside the screen.

At 1805, Beatty's radar picked up two more incoming planes that showed American IFF (Identification, Friend or Foe) signals. Lieutenant Commander Outerson passed the word to his main battery control to pick them up and open fire if they came within range. Control identified one as a Ju 88, but a smoke screen obscured the view over the next few moments, and radar alternatively picked up and lost contacts in the heavy haze.

While Beatty strove to fight her assailants, one German plane managed to close to about 500 yards and dropped a torpedo which struck the ship near frame 124 at about 1813, only ten minutes after the start of action. The blast jammed mounts 51 and 54 in train, hurled a K-gun and a depth charge stowage rack overboard, bent the starboard propeller shaft, flooded the after engine room, cut off all electrical power, flooded a magazine and put the ship in a 12-degree list to port. A quick muster showed 11 men missing, one officer and six men injured, and a man at the battle searchlight platform fatally burned by steam. One sailor at the starboard K-gun was blown overboard, and was picked up the next morning by Boyle.

The torpedo explosion in Beatty's vitals broke her back at about frame 124. It left the port side of the main deck awash from the break of the forecastle to about mount 54 and only 30 inches of freeboard on the starboard side. As a result, the ship slowly settled aft. While a bucket brigade valiantly attempted to bail out the flooding compartments, Beatty's sailors jettisoned practically everything from ready ammunition to her searchlight and smoke generator. Through a mistake of haste, even the towing cable went overboard as well.

Hopes of saving the ship flickered for the next four hours, as Beatty battled for her life. More and more stations were secured to release men for damage control tasks until only a bridge detail and crews on two 20 mm guns remained at battle stations. Around 1900, her sailors placed her boats and rafts in the water. Forty minutes later, Beatty transferred her wounded to Parker. As the list increased, her crew continued abandoning her until around 2230, when the last group left the ship and reached the rescue vessel, Laub. After breaking in two, Beatty sank at 2305 on 6 November 1943.

An estimated 25 German aircraft, many equipped with glider-bombs, took part in the raid, and sank two merchantmen in addition to Beatty.

== Awards ==
Beatty received three battle stars for her World War II service.
