= Powle =

Powle is a surname. Notable people with the surname include:

- Henry Powle (1630–1692), English lawyer and politician
- Richard Powle (1628–1678), English lawyer and politician

== See also ==
- Pole (surname)
- Poole (surname)
- Powles
- Powley
