= LOB =

LOB or LoB may refer to:

- Lancaster-Oslo-Bergen Corpus, of British English
- Left on base, a baseball term
- "Legion of Boom", a nickname for the defensive backfield of the NFL’s Seattle Seahawks during the 2010s
- Line of business, refers to LOB applications on mobile computers or PDAs
- Longbridge railway station, England, National Rail station code

== See also ==
- Lob (disambiguation)
