= William Benn (divine) =

English ejected minister

- Born: 1600; Egremont, Cumberland, England
- Died: March 22, 1680 (aged 79); Dorchester , England
- Occupation: Minister
- Known for: Ejected minister; preacher at All Saints, Dorchester

William Benn (or Ben) (November 1600 – 22 March 1680) was an English ejected minister.

== Life ==
Benn was born at Egremont, Cumberland, in November 1600. He was educated at the free school of St. Bees, and Queen's College, Oxford, but left university without taking a degree. When he went to Oakingham he discovered that a contemporary at Oxford, a man named Bateman, had chosen the same parish. Rather than settle it in court, they agreed to share the parish for several years.

Benn, having been chosen as her chaplain by Helena, Marchioness of Northampton (who lived in Somerset), left Oakingham to Bateman and continued with his patroness until 1629. That year he went to Dorchester (at the behest of John White), and through White's influence was made preacher of All Saints there. In the early 1650s he formed his own gathered church. Anthony Wood reported that he stayed there until 1662 (except for two years, when he assisted White as rector at Lambeth, Surrey in place of Daniel Featley). Besides his constant preaching in his own church, he preached on weekdays to prisoners, building a chapel inside the jail.

In 1654 Benn assisted the commissioners in discharging "scandalous, ignorant, and inefficient ministers and schoolmasters".

After his expulsion by the Act of Uniformity 1662, he remained at Dorchester until his death. He preached in conventicles, and was sometimes imprisoned and fined for this.

Benn died on 22 March 1680 and was buried in the churchyard of his own former church, All Saints.

== Works ==
Benn published A sober Answer to Francis Bampfield in Vindication of the Christian Sabbath against the Jewish, id est the observance of the Jewish still, a short treatise in the form of a letter (1672). After his death a volume of sermons, entitled Soul Prosperity, on John 3:2 was published in 1683 and is one of the rarest of later Puritan books.

== Family ==
A daughter of Benn's married the minister Theophilus Polwhele.

According to the Church Times, one of his descendents was the Labour politician Tony Benn.
