= Stephen Lobb =

English nonconformist minister and controversialist

- Born: 1647
- Died: 3 June 1699 (aged 51–52)
- Occupations: Minister, controversialist
- Spouse: Elizabeth (died 1691)
- Children: 3

Stephen Lobb (c. 1647 – 3 June 1699) was an English nonconformist minister and controversialist. He was prominent in the 1680s as a court representative of the Independents to James II, and in the 1690s in polemics between the Presbyterian and Independent groups of nonconformists. His church in Fetter Lane, London, is supposed to be the successor to the congregation of Thomas Goodwin; he was the successor to Thankful Owen as pastor, and preached in tandem with Thomas Goodwin the younger.

== Life ==
He was the son of Richard Lobb of Liskeard, Mill Park, Warleggan, and Tremethick, St Neot, Cornwall, who, in 1659, was briefly MP for Mitchell. In 1681 he settled in London as pastor of an independent congregation, first in Swallow Lane, and moving in 1685 to Fetter Lane. He was accused of being concerned in the Rye House Plot, and, with another minister named Casteers, was arrested in Essex and committed to prison in August 1683.

After James II had issued his declaration for liberty of conscience (4 April 1687), Lobb was one of the ministers selected by the independents to present an address of thanks to him. He became somewhat isolated because of his stance towards James; his frequent attendance at court, for which he was sometimes called the 'Jacobite Independent', led the church party to accuse him of promoting a repeal of the Test Act.

When Grocers' Hall was opened by the lord mayor on 23 September 1688, Lobb preached the sermon. After serving as a "preacher to a congregation of dissenting protestants at his house in Hampstead", the precursor to what later became Rosslyn Hill Unitarian Chapel, in 1694 he was chosen to fill one of the vacancies, occasioned by the exclusion of Daniel Williams, among the lecturers at Pinners' Hall, Old Broad Street. He died on 3 June 1699.

== Controversial writings ==
In conjunction with John Humfrey, Lobb wrote in 1680 an Answer ... by some Nonconformists to a sermon preached by Edward Stillingfleet on the ”mischief of separation”. Stillingfleet replied the same year in The Charge of Schism Renewed. Lobb and Humfrey thereupon retorted with a Reply to the Defence of Dr. Stillingfleet.

Lobb took a prominent part in the controversy between the Presbyterian and Independent denominations occasioned by the republication of Tobias Crisp's Works with Additions in 1690. To counteract what he considered to be Crisp's erroneous doctrine, Daniel Williams published in 1695 A Defence of Gospel Truth. Lobb joined issue with Williams in A Peceable Enquiry into the nature of the present controversie among our United Brethren about Justification, (1693). Williams having briefly replied, Lobb published A Vindication of the Doctor, and myself (1695). Lobb next wrote A Report of the present state of the differences in Doctrinals between some Dissenting Ministers in London (1697). This was answered during the same year by Vincent Alsop in A Faithful Rebuke to a False Report. Lobb rejoined with a Defence of his Report and Remarks on Alsop's Rebuke which was in turn castigated by Williams in The Answer to the Report, &c. (1698). At length Lobb sent forth An Appeal to Dr. Stillingfleet and Dr. Edwards concerning Christ's Satisfaction (1698), in which he insinuated that Williams and Richard Baxter favoured Socinianism. Stillingfleet in a reply said that the dispute in his opinion was idle and profitless. Lobb, however, still pursued the controversy in A further Defence of his Appeal, and it was closed by Williams in a pamphlet called An End to Discord. An anonymous disciple of Baxter dealt with Lobb's accusation in A Plea for the late Mr. Baxter, 1699.

== Family ==
By Elizabeth, the daughter of Theophilus Polwhele, nonconformist minister at Tiverton, Devon, he had three sons, Stephen (d. 1720), who conformed and became chaplain of Penzance Chapel, Cornwall, and vicar of Milton Abbot; Theophilus Lobb, a physician; and Samuel (d. 1760), who also conformed and obtained the rectory of Farleigh Hungerford, Wiltshire. His wife died in 1691. She has sometimes been identified as the playwright E. Polwhele, a contemporary of Aphra Behn and Frances Boothby.

== Notes ==
Attribution

This article incorporates text from a publication now in the public domain: "Lobb, Stephen". Dictionary of National Biography. London: Smith, Elder & Co. 1885–1900.
