= Laube =

Laube is a German surname. Notable people with the surname include:

- Bernd Laube (1950–2012), German footballer
- Clifford J. Laube (1891–1974), American newspaper editor, publisher, and Catholic poet
- Dylan Laube (born 1999), American football player
- Eižens Laube (1880–1967), Latvian architect
- Gustav Karl Laube (1839–1923), German geologist and paleontologist
- Heinrich Laube (1806–1884), German dramatist, novelist and theatre-director
- James Laube, American wine critic of Wine Spectator
- Nathan Laube (born 1988), American organist

== Places ==
- Laube, former name of Yablonovka, a rural locality in Saratov Oblast, Russia
