= Frank Edmund Beatty Jr. =

United States Navy admiral

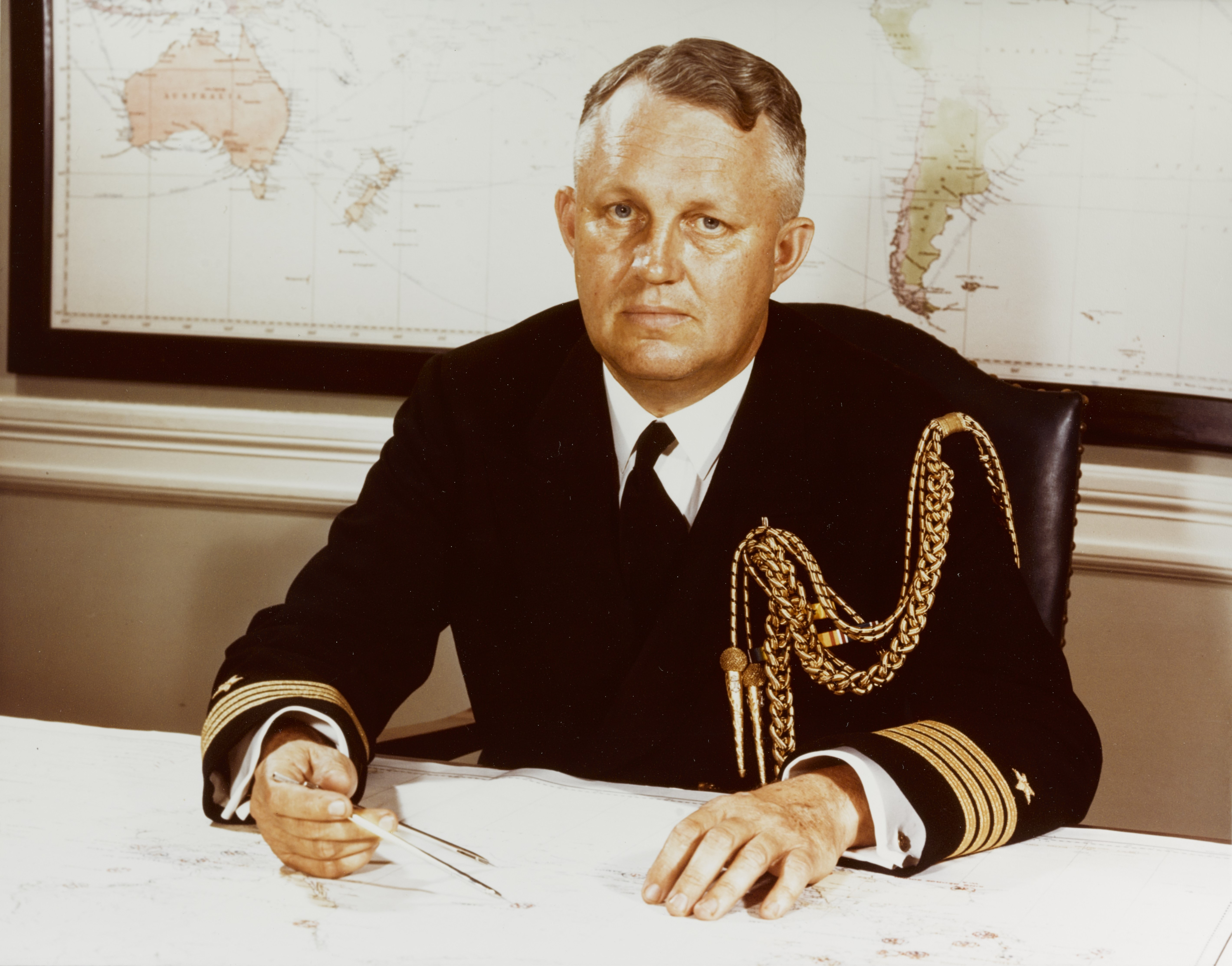
- Frank E. Beatty Jr. in 1942
- Born: June 17, 1894; Washington, D.C., US
- Died: November 12, 1976 (aged 82); Santa Monica, California, US
- Burial place: Arlington National Cemetery
- Relatives: Frank E. Beatty (father)
- Military career
- Allegiance: United States of America
- Branch: United States Navy
- Service years: 1916–1951
- Rank: Vice Admiral
- Commands: USS Long; USS Columbia
- Conflicts: World War I World War II
- Awards: Navy Cross; Bronze Star Medal; Legion of Merit (2)

Frank Edmund Beatty Jr. (June 17, 1894 – November 12, 1976) was a Vice Admiral in the United States Navy.

== Biography ==
Beatty was born on June 17, 1894, in Washington, D.C., to Frank E. Beatty, a Rear Admiral, and Anne Beatty. He graduated from the United States Naval Academy in 1916, and would later attend the Massachusetts Institute of Technology, earning a B.S. in mechanical engineering in 1922. Beatty married Patricia Horton, a native of Ireland. Their son, Denis, would serve as a Lieutenant in the Navy.

Beatty died on November 12, 1976, in Santa Monica, California. He was buried in Arlington National Cemetery.

== Career ==
During World War I, Beatty served aboard the battleship New York. Later he would take command of the destroyer Long from 1933 to 1934, followed by serving as an aide to the Commanding Destroyers Scouting Force, and as Executive Officer of the heavy cruiser Augusta from 1940 to 1941. From 1941 to 1943 he was an aide to Secretary of the Navy William Franklin Knox before taking command of the light cruiser Columbia from 1943 to 1944. Promoted to rear admiral, Beatty served as the Commander of U.S. Forces in the Aruba-Curaçao area during World War II from 1944 to 1945.

After the war, Beatty served as commander of the midshipmen training squadron, Atlantic Fleet and then as commander of destroyers, Atlantic Fleet. In 1947, he became commander of the Naval Ordnance Laboratory in White Oak, Maryland. In 1950, he began his final active-duty assignment as commandant of the Mare Island Naval Yard.

Beatty retired from the Navy in June 1951. Decorations he earned include the Navy Cross, the Bronze Star Medal, and he was twice awarded the Legion of Merit.
