= Richard Laub =

Richard S. Laub is a scientist from the United States. He is curator of geology at the Buffalo Museum of Science, and directs excavations at the Hiscock Site in Byron, New York. His work includes development of the hypothesis that tuberculosis led to the extinction of the mastodon.

== Personal life and education ==
Richard Laub has a bachelor's degree from Queens College, City University of New York, a Masters of Science in paleontology and paleoecology from Cornell University, and a PhD. from the University of Cincinnati.

== Work in paleoecology and archaeology ==
Laub's scientific interests are in paleoecology and archaeology of the Northeastern United States. He is curator of geology at the Buffalo Museum of Science and directs excavations at the Hiscock Site in Byron, New York. During the course of his work he has demonstrated that giant condors once lived in upstate New York.

Richard Laub has also hypothesized that an epidemic of tuberculosis helped drive the mastodon to extinction. He finds it likely that most late Ice Age mastodon in North America had the disease.
