= Powley =

Powley is a surname. Notable people include:

- Bel Powley (born 1992), English actress
- Bryan Powley (1871–1962), British actor
- Dylon Powley (1996–2024), Canadian soccer player
- Jen Powley (1977–2023), Canadian writer and disability advocate
- John Powley (1936–2020), British politician
- Lauren Powley (born 1984), American field hockey player
- Mark Powley (born 1963), British actor
