= Eliezer Löb =

German rabbi

Eliezer Löb (1837 in Pfungstadt, Grand Duchy of Hesse – January 23, 1892 in Altona, Hamburg) was a German rabbi. He was educated at the gymnasium of Darmstadt and at the University of Giessen, and received his rabbinical instruction chiefly under Benjamin Hirsch Auerbach, rabbi of Darmstadt, whose daughter he married. At first he was principal of the Jüdische Realschule in his native city, founded by him (1857–61). Subsequently he was called to the rabbinate of Ichenhausen, Bavaria, where he remained until 1873, when he was called to succeed Jacob Ettlinger as chief rabbi of Altona. He contributed to the Jüdische Presse, and prepared for publication H. J. Michael's bibliographical work Or ha-Chayyim but ill health prevented him from completing his labor, which was finished by A. Berliner. A rabbinical work by him, Dammeseq Eli'ezer remained in manuscript. He was a devoted worker for Orthodox communal affairs and was for years a trustee of the Hildesheimer Seminary at Berlin.
