= Leopold Einstein =

Jewish teacher, vendor and writer

Coordinates: 49°27′19.55″N 11°04′25.46″E

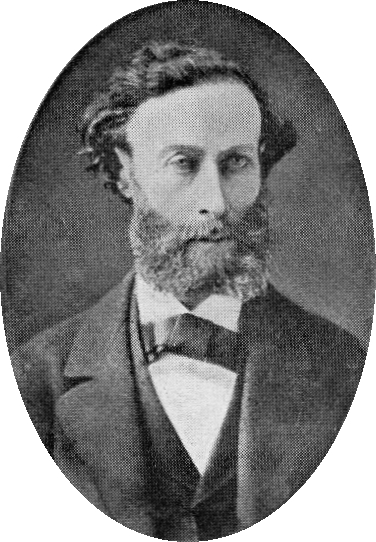
- Born: Leopold Löb; 1833
- Died: 8 September 1890 (aged 56–57); Nuremberg, Germany

Leopold Einstein (born Leopold Löb, 1833, died 8 September 1890 in Nuremberg) was a Jewish teacher, businessman, and writer. He was one of the early proponents of Esperanto.

He was the first chairperson of the "Nürnberger Weltspracheverein", a Volapük organization founded on 18 February 1885, and remained chairperson until his resignation due to poor health on 22 February 1888. He was a strong supporter of Volapük, and wrote about 200 German-language articles about it. In 1885, he published a German-language treatise about attempts at creating a world language from Leibniz to the present.

When Einstein read L. L. Zamenhof's Unua Libro in 1888, he became an Esperantist and began corresponding with Zamenhof. He began to work hard for the Esperanto movement despite attacks of his Volapükist colleagues. His German-language brochures became the foundation for the Esperanto movement in Germany even as Esperanto was being suppressed in Russia for political reasons. Because of his influence, the Nürnberger Weltspracheverein became Esperantist in 1888. Einstein wrote the first real textbook on Esperanto, in which he presented the language's correlative pronouns and adverbs in a table. He also introduced changes to the language's many root words.

After Einstein's death, Zamenhof wrote that his name should be written in gold letters in the history of Esperanto. However, later, during the Esperanto reform period of 1894, Zamenhof complained that the reform movement had begun when the members of Einstein's Nuremberg club "gave up Volapük and became Esperantists, with the condition that the necessary (in their opinions) reforms would be made to Esperanto."

On the 100th anniversary of Einstein's death, a plaque was hung in Nuremberg commemorating the house where he lived.

== Bibliography ==
- La lingvo internacia als beste Lösung des internationalen Weltspracheproblems: Vorwort, Grammatik und Styl nebst Stammwörter-Verzeichniß nach dem Entwurf des Pseudonymen Dr. Esperanto / zum ersten Male methodisch geordnet und ausgearbeitet von Leopold Einstein. - Nürnberg: Verl. von J. A. Stein's Buch- & Kunsthandlung, 1888. - 78 p.
