= HMS Haydon =

Destroyer of the Royal Navy

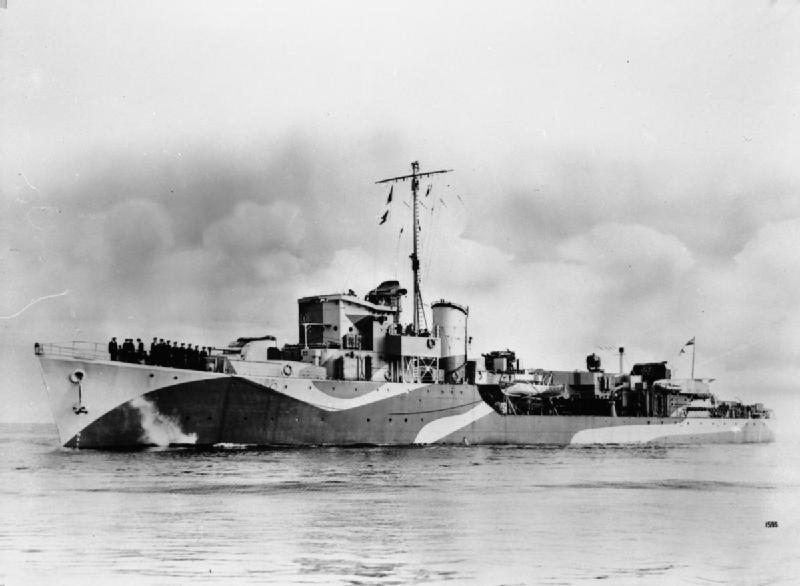
- Haydon underway, c. 1943

History

United Kingdom
- Name: Haydon
- Ordered: 23 August 1940
- Builder: Vickers-Armstrongs, High Walker
- Laid down: 1 May 1941
- Launched: 2 April 1942
- Completed: 24 October 1942
- Honours and awards: Sicily 1943; Salerno 1943; Aegean 1943; South France 1944; North Sea 1945
- Fate: Scrapped in 1958
- Badge: On a Field paly of eight, Gold and Red, a fox's mask White, holding in the mouth a bugle horn stringed also white.

General characteristics
- Class & type: Hunt-class destroyer
- Displacement: 1,050 long tons (1,070 t) standard; 1,435 long tons (1,458 t) full load
- Length: 85.3 m (279 ft 10 in) o/a
- Beam: 10.16 m (33 ft 4 in)
- Draught: 3.51 m (11 ft 6 in)
- Propulsion: 2 Admiralty 3-drum boilers; 2 shaft Parsons geared turbines, 19,000 shp (14,000 kW)
- Speed: 27 knots (31 mph; 50 km/h); 25.5 kn (29.3 mph; 47.2 km/h) full
- Range: 2,350 nmi (4,350 km) at 20 kn (37 km/h)
- Complement: 168
- Armament: 4 × QF 4-inch (102 mm) Mark XVI guns on twin mounts Mk. XIX; 4 × QF 2-pounder (40 mm) Mk. VIII AA guns on quad mount MK.VII; 2 × 20 mm Oerlikon AA guns on single mounts P Mk. III; 2 × 21-inch (533 mm) torpedo tubes; 110 depth charges, 4 throwers, 3 racks

HMS Haydon was a Hunt-class destroyer of the Royal Navy. She was a member of the third subgroup of the class, and saw service in the Second World War. Most of the ships of this class were named after British fox hunts. She was the first Royal Navy warship to bear this name, after the Haydon hunt in Northumberland. In 1942 she was adopted by the civil community of Wallsend in Northumberland, as part of Warship Week.

== Service history ==
On commissioning Haydon was allocated to the 5th Destroyer Flotilla, serving as an escort for Atlantic Convoys. In 1943 she transferred to the Mediterranean and was part of the Naval force in support of the allied landings in Sicily. In 1944 she served mostly in the Mediterranean and was part of the escort force nominated for the landings in Southern France, and then returned to Atlantic convoy escort work.

In 1945 she returned to service in the Mediterranean as part of the 3rd Escort Flotilla. She continued service in Malta until July 1947 when she was badly damaged by fire and after repair was withdrawn from service. She was then paid-off and placed in Reserve at Chatham in late 1947. She then entered the Reserve Fleet after further refit. She was the laid-up at Sheerness for a year and transferred to Hartlepool in 1948 and later her equipment was preserved. The ship was laid-up in the Reserve Fleet Division at Hartlepool until approval was given for her to be placed on the Disposal List in March 1958. Sold to BISCO on 17 May that year for demolition Clayton & Davie the ship arrived at Dunston-on-Tyne in tow on 18 May 1958.

== Sources ==
- Colledge, J. J. & Warlow, Ben, Ships of the Royal Navy: The Complete Record of all Fighting Ships of the Royal Navy from the 15th Century to the Present, Newbury, 2010
- English, John, The Hunts – A history of the design, development and careers of the 86 destroyers of this class built for the Royal and Allied Navies during World War II, Cumbria, 1987 (World Ship Society)
- Whitley, M. J., Destroyers of World War Two – an international encyclopedia, London, 1988
- Gardiner, Robert (ed.), Conway's All the World's Fighting Ships 1922–1946, London, 1987
