= Theophilus Polwhele =

- Born: Somerset, England
- Died: 1689
- Resting place: St Peter's Church, Tiverton
- Other name: Theophilus Polwheile
- Education: Emmanuel College, Cambridge (BA, MA)
- Occupations: Minister, author
- Children: Elizabeth, possibly E. Polwhele

Theophilus Polwhele or Polwheile (died 1689) was an English ejected minister.

== Life ==
From a Cornish background, Polwhele was born in Somerset. He entered Emmanuel College, Cambridge, as a sizar, on 29 March 1644, and had William Sancroft as a tutor, He graduated B.A. in 1648, M.A. in 1651.

In 1649 Polwhele became minister at Langton Long Blandford in Dorset, staying there until 1651. He then was preacher at Carlisle until about 1655. In 1654 he was a member of the committee for ejecting scandalous ministers in the four northern counties of Cumberland, Durham, Northumberland, and Westmorland. From that year until 1660, when he was driven from the living, he held the rectory of the portions of Clare and Tidcombe at Tiverton.

Polwhele sympathised with the religious views of the Independents, and from the Restoration of 1660 he was often in trouble for his religious opinions. On the 1687 Declaration of Indulgence, the Steps meeting-house was built at Tiverton for the members of the Independent congregation; he was appointed its first minister, with Samuel Bartlett as assistant. He was buried in the churchyard of St Peter's Church, Tiverton, on 3 April 1689.

== Works ==
Polwhele was the author of:

- Aὐθέντης, or a Treatise of Self-deniall, 1658; dedicated to the mayor, recorder, and corporation of Carlisle. There was a preface by his friend Ralph Venning.
- Original and Evil of Apostasie, 1664.
- Of Quencing the Spirit, 1667.
- Choice Directions how to serve God every Working and every Lord's Day, 1667; published by Thomas Mall as an addition to his ‘Serious Exhortation to Holy Living.’
- Of Ejaculatory Prayer, 1674; dedicated to Thomas Skinner, merchant in London, a supporter.

== Family ==
Polwhele's wife was a daughter of the Rev. William Benn of Dorchester. Their daughter Elizabeth married Stephen Lobb. It has been said that she may be the playwright "E. Polwhele", a contemporary of Aphra Behn and Frances Boothby.

== Notes ==
Attribution

This article incorporates text from a publication now in the public domain: Lee, Sidney, ed. (1896). "Polwhele, Theophilus". Dictionary of National Biography. Vol. 46. London: Smith, Elder & Co.
