= USS Laub (DD-613) =

Benson-class destroyer

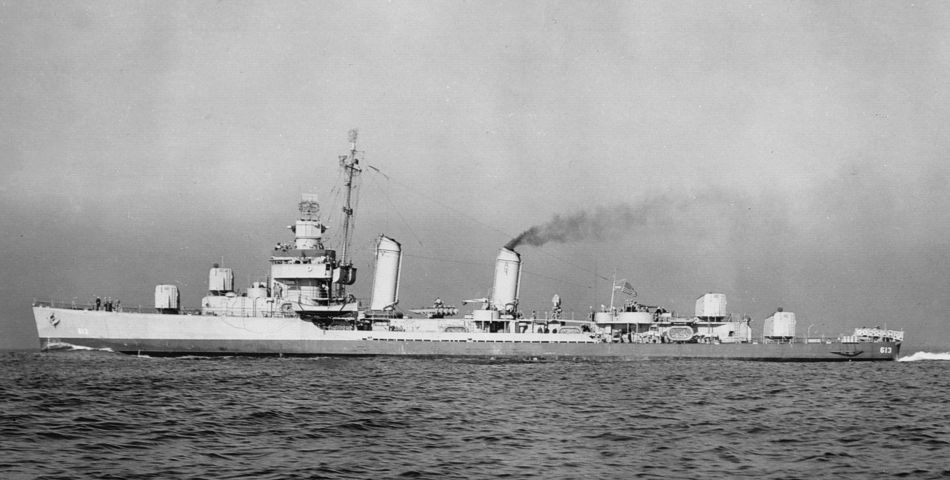
- USS Laub (DD-613)

History

United States
- Name: USS Laub (DD-613)
- Namesake: Henry Laub
- Builder: Bethlehem Shipbuilding, San Pedro, California
- Laid down: 1 May 1941
- Launched: 28 April 1942
- Commissioned: 24 October 1942
- Decommissioned: 2 February 1946
- Stricken: 1 July 1971
- Fate: Sold on 14 January 1975 and broken up for scrap

General characteristics
- Class & type: Benson-class destroyer
- Displacement: 1,620 tons
- Length: 348 ft 2 in (106.12 m)
- Beam: 36 ft 1 in (11.00 m)
- Draught: 17 ft 6 in (5.33 m)
- Speed: 36.5 knots (67.6 km/h)
- Complement: 276
- Armament: 5 x 5 in (130 mm)/38 guns, 10 x 21 inch (533 mm) tt.

USS Laub (DD-613) was a Benson-class destroyer in the United States Navy during World War II. She was the second ship named for Henry Laub, who was killed during the Battle of Lake Erie in 1813.

Laub was laid down 1 May 1941 by Bethlehem Shipbuilding, San Pedro, California; launched 28 April 1942; sponsored by Miss Barbara Mohun Handley, a collateral descendant of Henry Laub; and commissioned 24 October 1942.

== Service history ==
After shakedown along the west coast, Laub steamed through the Panama Canal, arriving Norfolk, Virginia 1 February 1943. She departed New York 7 February, escorting a convoy to North Africa. After reaching Casablanca, the destroyer patrolled the African coast until departing 14 March with a return convoy to the United States.

The following month, she sailed with another convoy. On 26 May, while escorting a return convoy, she joined other escorts in chasing off an enemy U-boat set on attacking the vulnerable supply ships in the convoy. The destroyer departed New York on her third extended voyage 11 June to join Allied forces in north Africa preparing for the invasion of Sicily. On 5 July she sailed from Oran to screen the transports and their passage to the strategic Sicilian beaches.

The amphibious force arrived off Sicily 4 days later, made a dramatic night landing, and the next day fought off Nazi aircraft. On the 11th, while bombarding the shore, Laub assisted in downing an aircraft. Continuing fire support operations, Laub destroyed four tanks and damaged strategic bridges.

The destroyer returned to Mers el Kebir 15 July and continued operations in the Mediterranean Sea until joining a convoy for America on 28 July. Laub made additional convoy runs to north Africa and the United Kingdom before returning to Oran to support the Allied campaigns in the Mediterranean.

Off north Africa 6 November, six planes made a torpedo attack on Laub's convoy, scoring several hits. Laub proceeded to assist the stricken ships, Beatty, Maraix, and Ruys, and rescued 341 survivors. From November 1943 until April 1944, the destroyer continued escort operations in the Mediterranean, and made several cross-Atlantic cruises from New York to the British Isles.

USS Laub (DD-613)

Returning to Oran 2 May, Laub sailed 10 days later with Philadelphia to provide fire support off the Anzio beachhead on the west coast of Italy. On the 23rd while bombarding the Italian coast, Laub collided with Philadelphia. Following temporary repairs at Naples and additional ones at Boston, Massachusetts the destroyer was back in Oran 2 December.

For the rest of the European campaign, she performed escort and fire support missions off the French-Italian coast. Departing Oran 15 May 1945, she reached Boston on the 23rd and began training in the Caribbean in preparation for Pacific duty. Laub returned to Casco Bay, Maine, when the Japanese surrender was announced.

The destroyer arrived Charleston, South Carolina, 2 November and decommissioned there 2 February 1946, joining the Atlantic Reserve Fleet. Laub was stricken from the Naval Register on 1 July 1971. She was then sold on 14 January 1975, and broken up for scrap.

== Awards ==
Laub received four battle stars for World War II service.
