= Henry Laub =

Henry Laub (9 March 1792 – 10 September 1813) was an officer in the United States Navy during the War of 1812.

== Biography ==
Born in York, Pennsylvania, Laub was appointed midshipman 1 October 1809 under Commodore Oliver Hazard Perry. Wounded in the early part of the Battle of Lake Erie, 10 September 1813, he was carried below but struck by a round shot that crashed through the cockpit, killing him instantly. Congress expressed deep regret at his loss, commended his gallantry, and ordered that a sword be presented to his nearest male relative.

== Namesakes ==
Two ships have been named USS Laub for him.
