= Frank E. Beatty =

American navy rear admiral

Frank Edmund Beatty
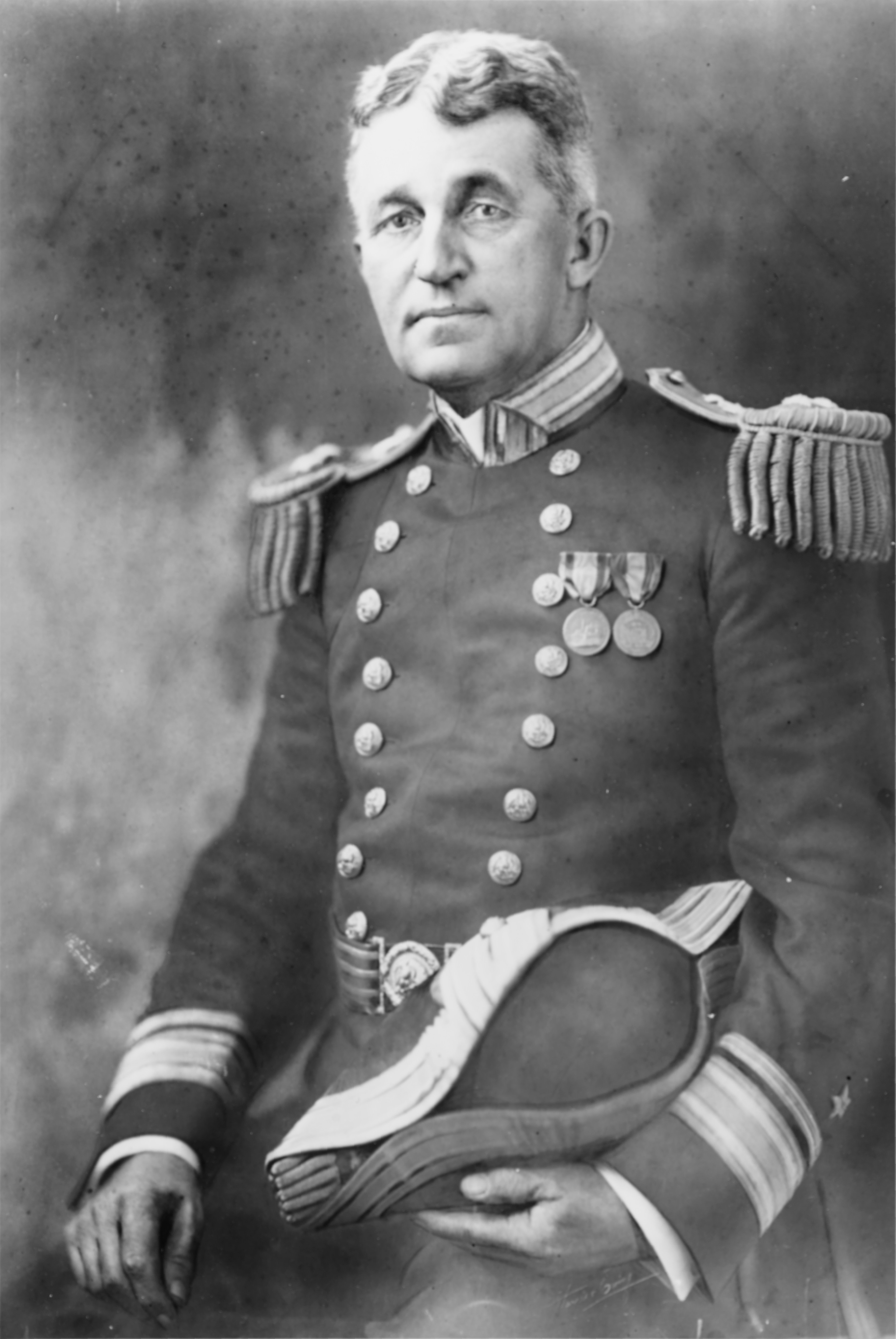
- Born: November 26, 1853; Aztalan, Wisconsin
- Died: March 16, 1926 (aged 72); Charleston, South Carolina
- Burial place: Arlington National Cemetery
- Military career
- Allegiance: United States of America
- Branch: United States Navy
- Service years: 1875–1919
- Rank: Rear Admiral

Frank Edmund Beatty (26 November 1853 – 16 March 1926) was a rear admiral in the United States Navy.

== Biography ==
Born in Aztalan, Wisconsin, Beatty graduated with the United States Naval Academy Class of 1875, and then served at sea in the wooden screw-sloop Tuscarora before receiving his ensign's commission in 1876. After service at sea in a succession of ships — Minnesota, Richmond, Despatch, and Tallapoosa — between 1878 and 1889, he completed two tours of duty on shore, first in the Library and War Records Office (among the predecessor offices of the present Naval Historical Center) and then participating in the deliberation of the International Marine Conference.

In the spring of 1892, Beatty returned to duty afloat, serving briefly in Ranger before being ordered to the monitor Miantonomoh. After torpedo instruction, the young officer — by then a lieutenant — served in the dynamite cruiser Vesuvius; and spent the next few years alternating between duty ashore at the Naval Academy and afloat, in Monongahela. Reporting to the gunboat Adams in the summer of 1897, he became that ship's executive officer in October and served in that capacity until transferred to the monitor Monterey in March 1898. The following spring, Beatty became the executive officer of gunboat Wheeling.

Shore duty at the Washington Navy Yard preceded a tour in charge of the Department of Yards and Docks in the Navy Department from 13 February 1901 to 21 January 1902. Two commands followed in succession: first, the nautical school ship Saratoga and then Gloucester, before he became Commander, Naval Base, Culebra, Puerto Rico, in February 1904, with additional duty commanding Gloucester.

After a brief tour first as assistant inspector and later as the inspector of the 9th Light House District, headquartered at Chicago, Illinois, Beatty spent the next decade alternating between ordnance duty ashore and service afloat, commanding in turn the cruisers USS Columbia (C-12) and USS Charleston (C-22) and the battleship USS Wisconsin (BB-9). His shore duty included a tour as Assistant Superintendent of the Naval Gun Factory, Washington Navy Yard; one in the Bureau of Ordnance as a member of the board on sights; and, ultimately, a stint as Commandant of the Washington Navy Yard and Superintendent of the Naval Gun Factory. While holding the latter post from 1905 to 1907, Beatty was instrumental in the development of an electric range finder.

Upon attaining flag rank in the spring of 1912, Beatty became a fleet division commander. Rear Admiral Beatty commanded a succession of Atlantic Fleet divisions — 4th, 1st, and 3d — in 1913 and 1914. The outbreak of war in Europe in the summer of 1914 found him in command of Division 3, with his flag in USS Virginia (BB-13). Detached from that duty in December 1914, he took up new duties as Commandant of the Norfolk Navy Yard and of the Norfolk Naval Station on 4 January 1915. Temporary duty in command of forces engaged in a war game in the spring of 1915 interrupted his tour at Norfolk; but, he soon returned to his duties there and carried them out until June 1916.

Reporting to the Chief of Naval Operations for "temporary duty in connection with naval districts" in October 1916, Beatty served briefly as the Commandant, 5th Naval District, before being switched to the 6th Naval District, at Charleston, South Carolina, in February 1917. He served in that post for the rest of World War I and into 1919.

Detached from all active duty in September 1919, he retired on 6 October 1919. Rear Admiral Beatty lived in Washington, D.C. after retirement, but died in Charleston on 16 March 1926 at the home of his daughter and son-in-law. His wife Anne Meem (Peachy) Beatty died five days later at Walter Reed Hospital in Washington. A joint funeral service was held for them on 23 March 1926 in Washington. They were buried at Section 2 of the Arlington National Cemetery, where they rest among other family members. Their son, Frank Edmund Beatty, Jr., Vice Admiral, United States Navy, is also buried nearby in the same section.

In his obituary, The New York Times noted that "Throughout his naval career Admiral Beatty was known as 'Charity' Beatty because he always tried to see the case from the delinquent's side. A brother officer of long experience once said that 'he is the most humane Admiral I ever sailed under.'"

== Namesakes ==
Two ships have been named USS Beatty for him.
