= Frances Boothby =

English playwright

- Occupation: playwright
- Writing career
- Language: English
- Years active: 1669–1670
- Notable works: Marcelia, or, The Treacherous Friend (1670)

Frances Boothby (fl. 1669–1670) was an English playwright and the first woman to have a play professionally produced in London.

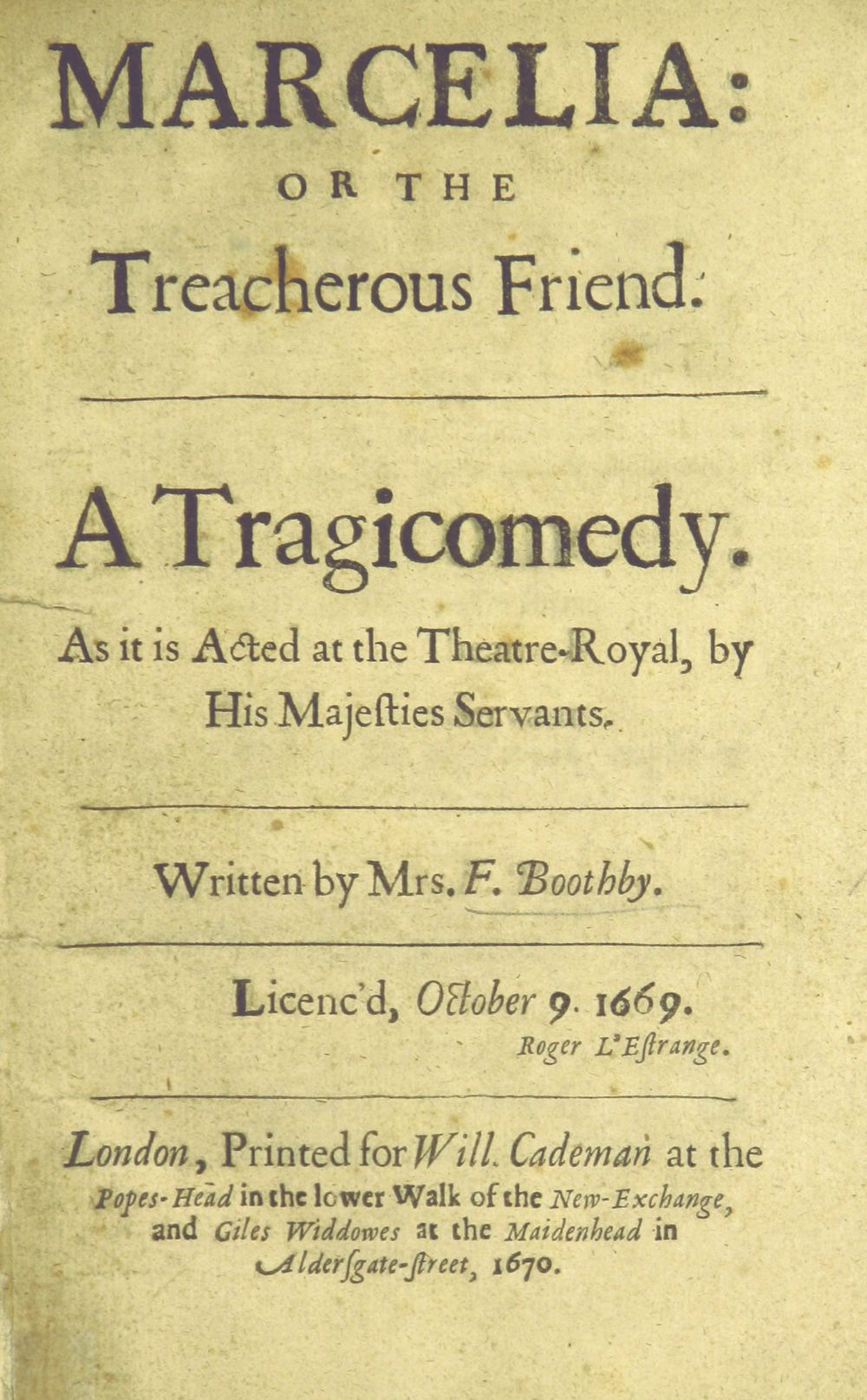
Title page of Frances Boothby's Marcelia: or the Treacherous Friend. London, 1670

== Life ==
Little is known of Boothby's life but the dedications of her two extant works have led to speculation that she may have been the daughter of Walter Boothby, a "prosperous merchant" with aristocratic connections.

Boothby is mainly remembered for her tragicomedy Marcelia, or, The Treacherous Friend (licensed 1669; published 1670). It was performed by the King's Company at the Theatre Royal, probably in August 1669. The published play is dedicated to Lady Mary Yate, of Harvington Hall in Worcestershire, whom she addresses as her kinswoman.

Marcelia is "a conservative work." The plot involves romantic difficulties and deceit in love precipitated by a king who abandons his lover to pursue the heroine. As order is reestablished by the end, full-blown tragedy is avoided. Audiences likely perceived implicit criticism of King Charles II in the character of the lustful king; such criticism of the monarch was "widespread, but as yet tactful."

Boothby's only other known work is a poem, addressed to her cousin Anne Somerset (née Aston), which laments the failure of her play, though one scholar writes that the play went off "with some success." She also left a collection of recipes.

== Works ==
- Marcelia: or the Treacherous Friend. A Tragicomedy. As it is Acted at the Theatre-Royal, by His Majesties Servants. Written by Mrs. F. Boothby. Licenc'd, October 9, 1669. Roger L'Estrange. London: Printed for Will. Cademan at the Popes-Head in the lower Walk of the New-Exchange, and Giles Widdowes at the Maiden-head in Aldersgate-street, 1670: Etext, British Library
