= Théophile Bader =

French businessman

- Born: 24 April 1864; Dambach-la-Ville, France
- Died: 16 March 1942 (aged 77); Paris, France
- Occupation: Businessman
- Parent(s): Cerf Bader; Adèle Hirstel
- Relatives: Ginette Moulin (granddaughter); Léone-Noëlle Meyer (granddaughter)

Théophile Bader (24 April 1864 – 16 March 1942), co-founder of Galeries Lafayette, was a French businessman and art collector whose family was persecuted during the Nazi occupation of France because of their Jewish heritage.

== Early life ==
Théophile Bader was born to Jewish merchants Cerf Bader and Adèle Hirstel. His family were vineyard owners and sold livestock. The family name, "Bader", resulted from 1808 Napoleonic decree from which required Jews to choose a fixed surname for themselves and their children. One of his ancestors, Jacques Lévy, chose Bader. It is possible that he borrowed the name from a non-Jewish friend. After the 1870 defeat and the annexation of Alsace-Lorraine to Prussia, the Baders, very attached to France, moved to Belfort where Théophile continued his studies. At the age of 14 years his parents sent him to Paris to work in clothing manufacturing.

== Career ==
In 1893, Bader and his cousin Alphonse Kahn opened a 70 square meter haberdashery called Les Galeries. On December 21, 1895, they acquired an entire building at 1 Rue La Fayette. They incorporated the Galeries Lafayette on September 1, 1899. During this period, the Galeries had their own studios where they manufactured clothing. These studios remained open until Ready-to-wear fashion entered the market in the 1960s.

In 1909, Ernest Werheimer and Émile Orosdi, future Chanel No. 5 partners, granted a loan of 800,000 francs to Galeries Lafayette to buy a neighbouring building. Bader was the one who introduced Weheimer to Coco Chanel and in 1924 he brokered the deal that lead to Chanel selling Parfums Chanel to the Werheimer brothers, receiving 20% of the enterprise in return.

In 1912, Alphonse Kahn retired from managing operations but continued to share the role of Chairman of the Board with his cousin. Bader put in place a relief fund, a nursery, and a pension fund before the imposition of statutory funds.

From 1916 to 1926, the Galeries Lafayette expanded to locations including Nice, Lyon, Nantes, and Montpellier. During the 1920s, Théophile Bader attempted to expand into other countries but with limited success. He invested personally in multiple businesses, notably D'Orsay (in 1916) and Vionnet. He became one of the firsts to sell ready-to-wear fashions in his large store, copying the haute couture models.

== Family ==
Théophile Bader had two daughters, Yvonne, who married Raoul Meyer, and Paulette, who married Max Heilbronn.

== Persecution of the Bader family during the Nazi occupation of France ==
During Nazi occupation of France in 1940, Les Galeries Lafayette underwent a process of "Aryanization", that is the removal of Jewish owners and their replacement by non-Jewish owners. Théophile Bader, Raoul Meyer, Max Heilbronn, the store's administrators and 129 Jewish employees were forced to resign. The property of Bader, Meyer and Heilbronn families was taken.

The Galeries Lafayette group was transferred to non-Jewish owners: the Swiss Aubert and the French industrialist Harlachol. Bader's sons-in laws Max Heilbronn and Raoul Meyer joined the anti-Nazi resistance.

== Death and legacy ==
Bader died on 16 March 1942.

After the victory over Nazi Germany, Bader's son in law, Max Heilbronn, founder of Monoprix, was released from Buchenwald where he had been interned. His other son-in-law, Raoul Meyer, filed a claim against the art dealer Christoph Bernoulli demanding the restitution of one of the artworks seized during the Nazi occupation of France, "Shepherdess Bringing in Sheep", by Camille Pissarro; however, the claim was unsuccessful

In 2012, Bader's granddaughter, Ginette Heilbronn Moulin, filed a criminal complaint against the Wildenstein art dealing family concerning a Monet that had been looted under the Nazis along with nine other paintings that had belonged to her father Max Heilbronn.

In 2014, another of Bader's granddaughters, Léone Meyer, filed a lawsuit against the Fred Jones Jr. Museum in Oklahoma demanding the restitution Shepherdess Bringing in Sheep which Bernoulli which had passed through several art dealers to end up in the USA after Bernoulli had sold it. The case has been dragging through courts in the USA and France.

== See also ==
- Galeries Lafayette
- Alexander Kreuter
- Aryanization
- The Holocaust in France
- Shepherdess Bringing in Sheep
