= Ginette Moulin =

French businesswoman (1927–2025)

- Born: Ginette Heilbronn; 7 February 1927
- Died: 9 February 2025 (aged 98)
- Occupation: Businesswoman
- Spouse: Etienne Moulin
- Parent(s): Max Heilbronn; Paulette Bader
- Relatives: Théophile Bader (grandfather); Léone-Noëlle Meyer (cousin)

Ginette Moulin (7 February 1927 – 9 February 2025) was a French businesswoman. She was the chairman and majority shareholder of Galeries Lafayette. She also owned 11.5% of Carrefour as well as a stake in Château Beauregard. As of 2016, Moulin and her family were worth an estimated €3 billion.

Heilbronn was born on 7 February 1927. Her father was Max Heilbronn, the founder of French retail chain Monoprix, and her grandfather was Théophile Bader, co-founder of Galeries Lafayette.

Moulin died on 9 February 2025, at the age of 98.
