= Helga Kreuter-Eggemann =

German art historian (1914–1970)

Helga Kreuter-Eggemann, née Helga Eggemann (1914 - 16 February 1970), was a German art historian involved in looting art in France during the Nazi occupation.

== Life ==
Helga Eggemann studied art history and received her doctorate from the University of Berlin in 1941. From 1941 to 1944 she worked for the Nazi looting organisation the Reichsleiter Rosenberg Taskforce (ERR) in France. During this time she was the lover of the business lawyer Alexander Kreuter, whom she later married. She lived in Munich and owned a collection of Gothic manuscripts, graphics from French impressionism and art nouveau arts and crafts.

In 1946 the OSS Art Looting Intelligence Unit investigated Eggemann for her involvement in the Nazi looted art trade and placed her on the Red Flag list.

In 2013, historians tracing the history of a Matisse that had been stolen by Nazis from the art collector Paul Rosenberg found that Eggemann had been involved in processing it at the Jeu de Paume museums where art looted from Jews was collected.

Other studies have found that Eggemann was not only involved in but organized the plunder of French Jewish collectors.

Eggemann was also involved in the looting from Raoul Meyer the Camille Pissarro entitled Shepherdess Bringing in Sheep (“La bergère rentrant des moutons”) and the Schwob d'Héricourt collection among others.

According to the French government's Database of Art Objects at the Jeu de Paume (Cultural Plunder by the Einsatzstab Reichsleiter Rosenberg) dozens of artworks looted from private Jewish collectors in France were inventoried by Eggemann for the Nazis.

== Writings ==
- Jacquemart de Hesdin und die Buchmacher am Hofe König Karls V. und des Herzogs von Berry. Berlin 1941 (= Dissertation)
- Evangelium im Bild. Worte aus den Evangelien und ihre Darstellung in der Kunst. Kösel, München 1954
- Das Skizzenbuch des „Jaques Daliwe“. Bruckmann, München 1964

== Literature ==
- Sammeln und Bewahren. Beiträge zur Kunst, Literatur und Buchgeschichte. Wölfle, München 1973, S. 28. 29 (Bild). 217
- Kunstwissenschaft insbesondere Buchmalerei und Mittelalter aus der Bibliothek Dr. Helga Kreuter-Eggemann und anderem Besitz. Wölfle, München 1978
- Jakob Kurz: Kunstraub in Europa 1938–1945. Facta Oblita Verlag, Hamburg 1989, S. 204–205
- Jonathan Petropoulos: The Faustian bargain. The art world in Nazi Germany. Oxford University Press, Oxford 2000, S. 333
- A qui appartenaient ces tableaux? La politique française de recherche de provenance, de garde et de restitution des oeuvres d’art pillées durant la Seconde Guerre mondiale / Looking for owners. French policy for provenance research, restitution and custody of art stolen in France during World War Two. Editions de la Réunion des musées nationaux, Paris 2008, S. 13

== See also ==
- Rose Valland
- The Holocaust in France
- Reichsleiter Rosenberg Taskforce
