= Léone-Noëlle Meyer =

- Born: 8 November 1939 (age 86); Paris, France
- Education: Sciences Po
- Occupations: Pediatrician, businesswoman, philanthropist
- Spouse: Georges Meyer
- Parent(s): Raoul Meyer; Yvonne Bader
- Relatives: Théophile Bader (grandfather); Ginette Moulin (cousin)

Léone-Noëlle Meyer (born 8 November 1939) is a French heiress, pediatrician, businesswoman and philanthropist. The adoptive granddaughter of the founder of the Galeries Lafayette, she served as its chairman from 1998 to 2005. She was a pediatrician for 45 years. She has made humanitarian trips to South America, Africa and Asia, and she has supported Jewish causes and the Paris Opera. She was awarded the 2007 Medal of the Great Donor by the French Ministry of Culture for her philanthropy.

== Early life ==
Léone-Noëlle Meyer was born on 8 November 1939 in Paris. Her father was unknown; her mother was a seamstress. Both her mother and her grandmother were deported to the Auschwitz concentration camp in 1942. She grew up in an orphanage in Rueil-Malmaison until 1946, when she was adopted by Yvonne Bader, the daughter of Théophile Bader, the founder of the Galeries Lafayette, and Raoul Meyer, who served as its chairman from 1944 to 1970. She grew up in the 16th arrondissement of Paris.

Meyer earned a bachelor of laws in 1960 and graduated from Sciences Po in 1961. She earned a doctorate in medicine in 1972.

== Career ==
Meyer began her career as a pediatrician at the Necker-Enfants Malades Hospital. She subsequently worked in ambulances for medical emergencies, and she taught at the Baudelocque Port-Royal Midwife School. Eventually, she opened a private practice as a pediatrician. She was a pediatrician for 45 years.

Meyer served as the chairman of the board of directors of Galeries Lafayette from 1998 to 2005. During her tenure, she visited the shop floor, suggested the salaries of shop assistants should be raised, and installed air conditioning to improve their working conditions. She sold her 29.5% stake to her cousin Ginette Moulin's family for €930 million in 2005.

Meyer owns a stake in Publicis.

== Philanthropy and political activity ==
Meyer went on humanitarian trips to Colombia, El Salvador, Cambodia, Mozambique and Burma. She has made charitable contributions to the Paris Opera and the Pasteur Institute. She donated a sailing boat to the École des mousses in the Brest Naval Training Centre in 2011. Meyer has also made charitable contributions to the Sons and Daughters of Jewish Deportees from France. Additionally, she has supported aliyah of Ethiopian Jews to Israel. Meyer was awarded the Medal of the Great Donor by the French Ministry of Culture in 2007. She turned down the Legion of Honour in 2010.

Meyer made political contributions to the Union for a Popular Movement.

== Personal life ==
Meyer married to Georges Meyer in 1964; he went on to serve as the chairman of the Galeries Lafayette, and he died in 1998. They had three sons: Alexandre, David and Raphaël.

Meyer resides in Paris, and she serves on the board of the synagogue on the rue Copernic in the 16th arrondissement. In 2006, she paid €151 million in solidarity tax.

== Nazi-looted art restitution case ==
In 2014, Meyer sued the University of Oklahoma and the Fred Jones Jr. Museum for the return of a Camille Pissarro painting that had been looted by Nazis from her father, Raoul Meyer, in 1941 during the German occupation of France. The refusal of the Fred Jones Jr. Museum caused Oklahoma's Republican state representative Mike Reynolds to call on the American Association of Museums to review the museum's accredidation status for violating ethical bylaws.

In 2016, after a long legal battle, during which the museum refused to restitute Shepherdess Bringing in Sheep (Bergère rentrant des moutons) by Camille Pissarro, Meyer arrived at a settlement with Fred Jones Jr. Museum of Art, and was able to bring the painting back to France.

However the settlement specified that the painting not remain in France but, after five years, return to the United States and that the process of transferring the painting be repeated every three years in a kind of shared custody agreement. The painting, which had been displayed at Paris’ Musée d’Orsay since its return to France, was due to return to Oklahoma in 2021. In 2020 Meyers contested the agreement as unworkable, initiating a legal action in a French court. The Fred Jones Jr Museum sued Meyers, demanding that she be fined "$3.5m in the US and face penalties of up to $100,000 a day for contempt of court if she does not halt proceedings in France in which she is seeking full ownership of the impressionist work".

On 1 June 2021, Meyer, who was 81 years old, abandoned the fight, relinquishing ownership of the Pissarro painting to the University of Oklahoma, stating, "I have no other choice.

== See also ==
- Théophile Bader
- The Holocaust in France
