= Davide Padoa =

Davide Padoa is the CEO of Design International and graduated from the Faculty of Architecture in Milan. Padoa finished his architectural studies in California at the University of Pomona. After his graduation as architect in the US and Italy, Padoa moved to the U.K. and then to Indonesia, where he worked as a design director in one of the largest engineering and architecture practices. During that period, he lectured architecture at Trisakty University and established an international relationship between the Indonesian and Italian governments for large regeneration projects.

In Indonesia, Padoa designed for Dharmala Bank and PSP Group the tallest skyscraper in Jakarta at the age of 25. In 1998 he moved to London where he joined Design International, a London-based architecture firm with offices worldwide.

Padoa was appointed managing director in 2002 and chief executive officer in 2006.

Padoa designed Morocco Mall, the second largest shopping centre in Africa, which includes one of only four Galeries Lafayette stores outside France. Morocco Mall has won many awards, including a Guinness World Record for "The largest in-store shop facade".

Padoa also designed Nave de Vero, a shopping centre in Venice, Italy. In November 2014, the project was awarded a BREEAM rating of ‘Very Good’. This achievement makes the shopping centre the first commercial project in Italy to achieve this certification. In Italy Padova designed Maximall Pompeii, in Torre Annunziata, Campania, considered the biggest shopping centre of South Europe.

Padoa is married to an Indonesian sculptor and has two daughters, including Raquel who studies at Imperial College London.
