= Christoph Bernoulli =

Swiss art dealer and interior designer

Carl Christoph Friedrich Bernoulli (born 2 October 1897 in Basel; died 9 August 1981 in Rheinfelden) was a Swiss art dealer and interior designer from the Bernoulli family of scholars.

== Early life ==
Christoph Bernoulli was born in 1897, into the well-known Bernoulli family. Son of the librarian Carl Christoph Bernoulli and Anna Bertha, née Burger, he spent his childhood in Basel with two older sisters. In 1917 he began to study law in Basel and Zurich but soon switched to philosophy, music history and German literary history, completing his doctorate in 1921 on The Music of Romanticism.

In 1921 he and his father founded the music publishing house "Edition Bernoulli" in Berlin, in 1922 he was a trainee at Frankfurter Zeitung. On 4 March 1926 he married Alice. The couple had two sons: Carl Christoph (1929–2011) and Peter Daniel (1936–2007). Bernoulli worked mainly as an art dealer and interior designer.

Among his acquaintances among the cultural workers in Berlin in the 1920s were the actress Eleonora von Mendelssohn and her brother, the musician Francesco von Mendelssohn. The Bernoulli couple remained friends with the von Mendelssohn siblings until their death and they visited each other frequently.

== Art ==
In 1938/1939 Bernoulli was commissioned to furnish the wine bar in the model hotel at the Swiss National Exhibition in Zurich. He collected Appenzell peasant painters and in 1941, together with Lucas Lichtenhan, organized the Swiss Folk Art exhibition at the Kunsthalle Basel.

Bernoulli helped organize exhibitions of tapestries from the High Middle Ages and of old silver at the Kunstmuseum Basel.

== Investigations into Nazi-era activities (1933-1945) ==
Switzerland was a major center for trading in Nazi-looted art and numerous investigations named Christoph Bernoulli as one of the art dealers involved in this trade.

In 1946 the Office of Strategic Services (OSS) Art Looting Intelligence Unit compiled a list of people who were allegedly involved in "looted art" trafficking in which Bernoulli appears in connection with Nazi looter Hans Wendland ("Reported also by French Police to have transacted business in Paris on Wendland's behalf.)" and the E.R.R. looting organization. ("Six ERR-confiscated pictures passed through his hands.")

The Swiss Bergier report commissioned by the Swiss government in 1996 to investigate Switzerland's activities during World War II, emphasized Bernoulli's role in bringing degenerate art from Germany [to] come to American museums, notably the Museum of Modern Art in New York."

Bernoulli had a close, long-term relationship with both Curt Valentin and Alex Vömel, the Nazi art dealer who in 1933 Aryanized the gallery of his former employer Alfred Flechtheim. Vömel sold part of Flechtheim's collection through Bernoulli.

The Basel Historical Museum describes Bernoulli as an "educated and sociable art connoisseur "and says that "During the time of National Socialism he supported numerous emigrants".

== Postwar career ==
Bernoulli continued his art dealing, curatorial and cultural activities after the war. In 1946 Bernoulli set up the Swiss embassy in Paris, which was used as a warehouse during the war, for his friend, the historian, diplomat and writer Carl Jacob Burckhardt. In 1947 he worked on the decor of the newly created Ciba Foundation in London.

In 1950/1951, Bernoulli was appointed honorary delegate for exhibition questions at the Kunsthalle Basel, where he co-organized the following exhibitions: Blauer Reiter, 1950; L'Apocalypse - Tapestries from Angers Cathedral, 1951; Old silver from a private collection in Basel, 1951; Treasures of Ancient Egyptian Art, 1953; Masterpieces of Greek Art, 1960; 125 years of landscape painting in Basel, 1964. After the complete renovation, in 1955 he took over the furnishing of the Wildt'schen House on Petersplatz in Basel. During 1963/1964 he undertook to create a museum for the Baur Collection in Geneva. In 1966 he and a team organized a new Jewish museum in Basel's old town and helped set up the Antikenmuseum Basel. In 1976/77 he set up a museum in the converted Murten town mill.

In 1962, he published Schweizerische Volkskünstler and in 1964 he published "Ansprache anlässlich der Eröffnung der zweiten Jubiläumsausstellung "125 Jahre Basler Landschaft" am 5. Sept. 1964 in der Kunsthalle".

Bernoulli died on 9 August 1981 in Rheinfelden (AG).

== Restitution claims ==
Several claims for restitution by the families of Jewish collectors persecuted by the Nazis involve artworks that passed through Bernoulli. One of the most famous is Léone Meyer's claim against the Fred Jones Jr. Museum of Art at the University of Oklahoma for the Pissarro Shepherdess Bringing in the Sheep. The painting was looted by the Nazis in Paris in 1941 and has been the object of ferocious legal battles for decades. Bernoulli acquired the looted painting, before selling it in New York. After the war, Raoul Meyer tried to recover his looted paintings, and in 1953, he sued Bernoulli for its return as Nazi loot but a Swiss judge dismissed the suit, saying a five-year window for such lawsuits had passed. Decades later, his granddaughter located the painting in the Fred Jones jr. Museum of Art and sued for restitution.

In 2021, an heir of Lotte von Mendelssohn-Bartholdy, who was also known as Countess Charlotte von Wesdehlen, made a restitution claim against the Kunstmuseum Basel for a painting by Henri Rousseau that the museum had purchased through Bernoulli. The museum acknowledged that the Jewish art collector has been persecuted by the Nazis but refused to restitute The Muse that Inspires the Poet.

== Work ==
=== Monographs ===
- Die Psychologie von Carl Gustav Carus und deren geistesgeschichtliche Bedeutung. Diss., Diederich, Jena 1925.
- Vom Sinn des Kunsthandwerks. Offizin Hartung, Hamburg 1961.
- Alberto Giacometti, 1901–1966, Erinnerungen und Aufzeichnungen. Huber, Bern 1974.
- Christoph Bernoulli: Ausgewählte Vorträge und Schriften. Mit Briefen und Beiträgen von Freunden. Hrsg. von Peter Nathan. Berichthaus, Zürich 1967.

=== Texts (selection) ===
- Rudolf Hanhart; Vorwort von Christoph Bernoulli: Appenzeller Bauernmalerei. Niggli, Teufen 1959/1970.
- René Wehrli; Textbeiträge von Christoph Bernoulli und Ernst Morgenthaler: Hans Fischer genannt Fis. Artemis Verlag, Zürich 1959.
- Christoph Bernoulli: Kleine Festrede zum 80jährigen Bestehen des Museums für Kunst und Kulturgeschichte Dortmund. Schloss Cappenberg, 10. April 1963. Kulturamt, Dortmund 1963.
- Manuel Gasser, Willy Rotzler: Kunstschätze in der Schweiz. Einl. von Christoph Bernoulli. Manesse Verlag, Zürich 1964.
- Christoph Bernoulli: Gedenkrede in Georg Schmidt 1896-1965. Basel 1965.
- René Creux; unter Mitarbeit von Christoph Bernoulli: Volkskunst in der Schweiz. Editions de Fontainemore, Paudex 1970.
- Charles Apothéloz; Vorwort von Christoph Bernoulli: Meisterwerke des Scherenschnitts. J. J. Hauswirth, L. Saugy. Huber, Frauenfeld 1978.

== Literature ==
- René Bernoulli-Sutter; unter Mitarbeit von Lion Bernoulli: Die Familie Bernoulli, Helbing & Lichtenhahn, Basel 1972.
- Christoph Bernoulli – Spass mit Briefmarken, Enveloppements, Christoph Bernoullis Briefmarken-Spiele. Basler Zeitung, Basel 1979.
- Blubacher, Thomas (2012). Gibt es etwas Schöneres als Sehnsucht? die Geschwister Eleonora und Francesco von Mendelssohn (1. Aufl ed.). Berlin. ISBN 978-3-458-35813-8. OCLC 794503889.
- Blubacher, Thomas (2010). "Die Holbeinstrasse, das ist das Europa, das ich liebe" achtzehn biographische Miniaturen aus dem Basel des 20. Jahrhunderts. Basel. ISBN 978-3-7965-2703-6. OCLC 696036197.
- Fluchtgut--Raubgut : der Transfer von Kulturgütern in und über die Schweiz 1933-1945 und die Frage der Restitution. Esther Tisa Francini, Anja Heuss, Georg Kreis. Zürich: Chronos. 2001. ISBN 3-0340-0601-2. OCLC 50387692.

== See also ==
- Shepherdess Bringing in Sheep
- List of claims for restitution for Nazi-looted art
- History of the Jews in Switzerland
- Paul von Mendelssohn_Bartholdy
