= Tredefina =

WWII financial institution

Treuhandverwaltung für das Deutsch-Niederländische Finanzabkommen GmbH (Tredefina) was a public law institution originally formed in 1920 by the Weimar Republic which during the Nazi occupation of Europe was used by CEO Alexander Kreuter to purchase Aryanized companies. Originally created to administer a revolving loan from the Netherlands of 140 million Dutch guilders, Tredefina remained active until the early 21st century.

== History ==
=== Founding and activities ===
After the end of World War I, the German economy faced, among other things, a considerable shortage of foreign currency, which hindered the urgently needed import of food and industrial raw materials. Since Dutch banks were again intensifying their relations with Germany after the end of the war, Matthias Erzberger, who was appointed Reich Minister of Finance on June 21, 1919, had the banker and chairman of the board of the Nederlandsche Handel-Maatschappij, Cornelis Johannes Karel van Aalst, inquire as early as July 1919 about the willingness of Dutch banks to grant a loan of 500 million guilders to the German Reich. After long negotiations, led on the German side by Alexander Kreuter, Commissioner for Raw Materials and Manufactured Goods of the "Dictatorial Economic Committee", the State Treaty on the German-Dutch Financial Agreement was signed on May 11, 1920. Under this agreement, Dutch banks granted the German Reich a one-time emergency loan of 60 million guilders for the import of foodstuffs from the Netherlands or the Dutch Indies and 140 million guilders as a revolving credit to finance imports of raw materials for German industry. The interest rate was 6 percent.

Thereupon, the Treuhandverwaltung für das Deutsch-Niederländische Finanzabkommen GmbH (Trust Administration for the German-Dutch Financial Agreement) was founded with a share capital of 200,000 marks (50% of which was paid in) to administer the loan, with Kreuter as its head. The agreement then came into force towards the end of 1920 and was subsequently extended several times. Tredefina granted, against appropriate credit security through the assignment of goods as collateral or the pledging of capital assets such as ships, The loans usually ran for one year, with the possibility of a prolongation, and were to be repaid in effective guilders. Borrowers were obliged to always mark stocks of goods transferred as collateral for the loan and the rooms or places where they were kept with the designation "DNF". The loan was repaid in the first years of the Second World War, after the occupation of France.

=== World War II ===
During World War II, Tredefina was used by Kreuter, by then a member of the General SS and in the service of the Foreign Intelligence Service headed by Walter Schellenberg in Office VI of the Reich Security Main Office (RSHA) of the SS, to purchase Aryanized companies, that were taken over from Jewish owners. Tredefina first took control of the "Aryanized" French investment bank "Société Financière pour l'Étranger" (SFE), and renamed it "Société de Crédits et d'Investissements" (SCI). This bank was then used to buy up "Aryanized" shares in French companies with money from Tredefina, including the "Société de Crédits et d'Investissements" (SCI). These included the Société des Schistes Bitumineux d'Autun, which exploited oil shale near Autun, and the Galeries Lafayette department store chain.

=== Postwar ===
The credit was renewed after World War II by a Dutch banking syndicate. Tredefina, now with branches in Düsseldorf and Munich, existed until the early 1970s.

== Literature ==
- Martijn Lak: Tot elkaar veroordeeld: de Nederlands-Duitse economische betrekkingen tussen 1945–1957. Uitgeverij Verloren, Hilversum 2015, ISBN 978-90-8704-547-0, S. 139–143: Een Nederlands krediet voor Duitsland?
