= Panafrica =

French footwear company

- Type: Société par actions simplifiée
- Industry: Footwear
- Founded: 2015; 11 years ago
- Founders: Hugues Didier; Vulfran de Richoufftz
- Headquarters: Paris, France
- Products: Shoes
- Website: panafrica-store.com

Panafrica is a French footwear company. Founded in 2015 by Hugues Didier and Vulfran de Richoufftz, it manufactures part of its collections in Africa, including in the Ivory Coast and Morocco.

== History ==
Panafrica was founded in 2015 by Hugues Didier and Vulfran de Richoufftz. In 2017, Panafrica opened its first pop-up store at Galeries Lafayette in Paris. In 2020, Panafrica collaborated with the French brand agnès b. on a footwear collection distributed in several countries. The same year, the company also entered into a partnership with Monoprix, which was renewed in 2024.

Panafrica partnered with The Tanzanite Experience, a Tanzanian company specializing in tourism and retail activities, in 2023. This enabled Panafrica products to be distributed through 25 retail outlets in Tanzania.

Panafrica partnered with La Poste in 2025 to collaborate on limited collection footwear.

In 2026, the company opened its first manufacturing facility in Abidjan, Côte d'Ivoire.

== Activities ==
Panafrica specializes in the design and marketing of footwear. Its collections are manufactured in several African countries, including Côte d'Ivoire and Morocco.
