= Agnès b. =

French fashion designer (born 1941)

Agnès Troublé
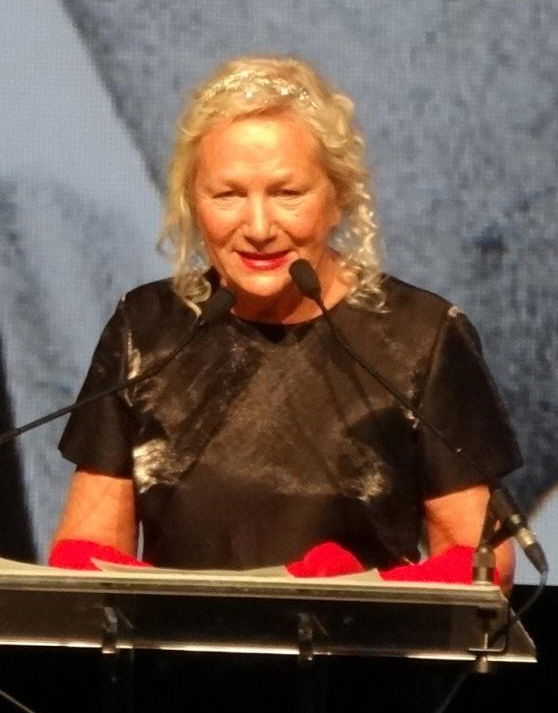
- Born: Agnès Andrée Marguerite Troublé; 1941 (age 84–85); Versailles, France
- Education: École du Louvre
- Label: agnès b.
- Website: www.agnesb.com

agnès b. (born Agnès Andrée Marguerite Troublé, 1941) is a French fashion designer with a namesake fashion label. Her designs are characterized as simple and accessible, and her signature item is the snap cardigan.

She uses her brand to finance art and cinema projects.

== Life and early career ==
Agnès was born and raised in Versailles, and was one of four children.

Agnès married and had children with Christian Bourgois, who later became a successful book publisher. They separated when Agnès was 20, but she kept the "B" from his surname for her brand.

She began working at Elle magazine after a fashion editor noticed her personal style and offered her a job. Agnès worked as a junior fashion editor, then pivoted to freelance fashion design.

In 1976, she opened her first boutique in Les Halles. Agnès was influenced by clothes she'd find at the flea market, and her designs were simple and easy to wear.

== Snap cardigan ==
Agnès designed the snap cardigan in 1979, when she cut up a crewneck with scissors and added snap buttons. It became a "worldwide hit", and an "ageless, timeless wardrobe staple from New York to Tokyo to Paris".

To celebrate 40 years of the design, Agnès hosted an exhibition titled "Photographers… Artists and the Snap Cardigan", with over 70 photographers taking pictures of the cardigan, including Juergen Teller and filmmakers Jim Jarmusch and David Lynch.

== Expansion ==
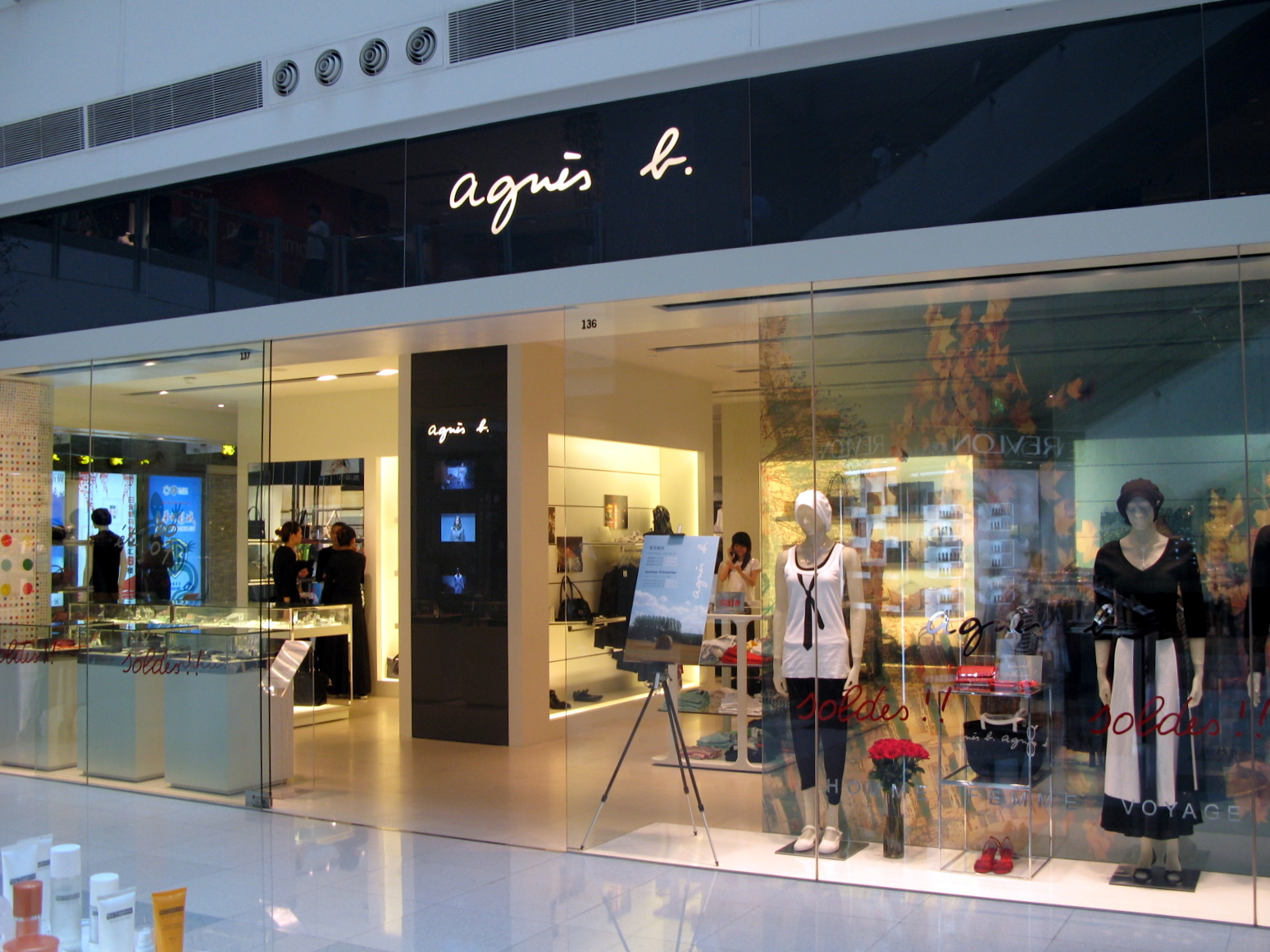
agnès b store in Shanghai

agnès b. started designing menswear in 1981 after observing men appropriate clothes designed for women. She opened her first international store on Prince Street in New York's SoHo district in 1983. Her enthusiasm for the city stemmed from her love of the American crime film genre, dubbed film noir in France. This interest extended to the store's decor, which included vintage, oversized movie posters. The one-sheets would eventually draw the attention of filmmaker Harmony Korine, who would begin an artistic collaboration with agnès in 1999.

agnès b. launched "Le b." perfume in 1987, a skincare and cosmetics line. Over time, her designs would grow to include maternity wear, shoes, and bags. Additionally, agnès b. has designed watches and eyewear for Seiko and a beauty line for L'Oréal. She has shops in London, Amsterdam, Singapore, Taipei, Tokyo, Hong Kong, and New York with more to open in Beijing and Shanghai.

In 2020, French footweat company Panafrica collaborated with agnès b. on a footwear collection distributed in several countries.

As of October 2023, agnès b. operates one store in New York City, at 1063 Madison Avenue, which originally opened in 1984, and an online e-boutique.

Agnès Troublé says she wants to set an example with her business and social responsibility: 'To me, there is a consistency between the fact that the clothes are made here and what I am, what I do, what I love to do.' She currently supports several associations, including AIDES, ACT UP and Handicap International.

== Gallery and periodical ==
In 1984, agnès b. opened the Galerie du Jour in Paris, exhibiting Graffiti artists such as A-one, Futura 2000, Henry "Banger" Benvenuti, Sharp, and others; Bazooka, Bad BC, Echo et Mode2, BBC (Bad Boys Crew), Ash, Skki et Jayonedont, Les Tétines Noires, les Frères Ripoulin. The library-gallery on rue du Jour eventually relocated to rue Quincampoix in the 4th arrondissement. A second library-gallery agnès b. then opened in Japan.

The brand also has a periodical on contemporary art called Point d'ironie.

== Film interests and production company ==
agnès b. founded a joint film concern with Harmony Korine called O'Salvation, under whose banner Korine began production on Mister Lonely in London in 2006.

She also designated an entity for personal projects, christened Love Streams, with the blessing of Gena Rowlands, widow of John Cassavetes, who directed the 1984 film of the same name.

Her acts of film patronage include the supplying of completion funds to Gaspar Noé for Irréversible (2002) and to Claire Denis for Trouble Every Day (2001), as well as the underwriting of numerous film festivals. She has also directed two documentaries (as Agnès Troublé): Une sorte de journal vidéo in 2011, and Je m'appelle Hmmm.... in 2013, which entered in competition for the Orizzonti section of the 70th Venice International Film Festival.

The brand also operated a film production company, Love streams productions agnès b., which shuttered a number of years ago.

== Honours ==
- She was made Chevalier (Knight) of the Ordre national du Mérite on 21 May 1985, and promoted Officier (Officer) in 1997.
- She was made Chevalier (Knight) of the Légion d'honneur in 2000.

== Notes ==
- "Mother of Reinvention" by David Hershkovits, Paper Magazine, retrieved April 17, 2006
- "Agnès B: Film & Fashion" by Boyd Davis, Fashion Windows website, retrieved April 18, 2006
- agnes b., 2000 interview by Mary Clarke, Index Magazine, retrieved April 17, 2006
- Liberté, Égalité, Agnès B. by Laura Jacobs, Vanity Fair September 2011
