= Alphonse Kahn =

French businessman (1864–1927)

Alphonse Kahn (9 December 1864 in Kolbsheim (Alsace) – 25 May 1927 in Paris) was a French businessman.

== Biography ==
Alphonse Kahn was born in Kolbsheim, (Alsace, France) on 9 December 1864 to Salomon Kahn et Rosalie (Rosa) Kahn. His wife was named Georgette.

On 13 December 1893, Kahn joined forces with his Alsatian cousin Théophile Bader to create the general partnership Alphonse Kahn & Cie, which operated the first store, Aux Galeries Lafayette, which opened at 1 rue La Fayette in Paris in January 1894. this was the beginning of what was to become the Galeries Lafayette Group.

Although Kahn retired from administration and operational management in 1912, he remained a shareholder and shared the chairmanship of the board of directors with Théophile Bader until his death in 1927.

Kahn is buried in the Montparnasse cemetery (division 30).

== See also ==
- Galeries Lafayette
- Theophile Bader
- History of the Jews in Alsace
