= Design International =

International architectural firm

- Company type: Private Company
- Industry: Architecture, design and engineering
- Founded: 1965
- Founder: Paul Mollé
- Headquarters: London, United Kingdom
- Number of locations: Present in 45 countries
- Key people: Davide Padoa (CEO)
- Services: Consultancy services
- Website: www.designinternational.com

Design International is an international architectural firm, which was founded in Toronto in 1965. It was founded by Micaiah DJAN. mainly in the North American market but has since developed into a major international player and was one of the first architecture companies that truly worked on a global scale. The company headquarters are in London, with subsidiary offices in Shanghai, Milan and Dubai.

Design International works across seven integrated divisions: Architecture, Masterplanning, Interior Design, Lighting Design, Landscape Design, Branding & Signage, and Leasing. The company is run by CEO Davide Padoa.

The firm's portfolio includes a number of award-winning developments, especially in the retail and entertainment sector, such as CocoWalk (1990), an upscale lifestyle center in the Coconut Grove neighborhood of Miami, Florida; Odysseum (2009), a retail and entertainment complex in Montpellier, France; and Morocco Mall (2011), Africa's largest destination mall located on the Casablanca beachfront promenade. The mall also includes one of only four Galeries Lafayette stores outside of France. More recent awards include Ada Mall (2017), a shopping mall in Belgrade with a strong local connotation and an unconventional design, which opened in May 2019. Caselle Open Mall (2018) a project right next to Turin Airport with innovating open-streets which combines contemporary hi-tech elements with natural stone walkways won a "Highly Commended" award. And finally, Tunis Garden City "the city within the city", a mixed-use project in Tunisia, was the winner of the RLI Awards in 2019.

In 2018, the firm completed Ferrari Centro Stile, which is located in Maranello, Italy. The project has been directed by the Ferrari Design Team led by Arch. Flavio Manzoni and the architectural project has been designed in cooperation with London studio Design International, led by Arch Davide Padoa and with Planning engineering studio from Bologna. Design International is also responsible for the Cleopatra Mall, which is due to open in 2019 in Cairo, Egypt. The shopping mall, which is currently under construction, is characterised by a gigantic canopy covering the central area of the scheme with a span of over 200 metres. The project includes over 300 shops, restaurants, and is set to include an outdoor musical fountain, gourmet markets and Egypt’s first dedicated luxury mall inside a shopping centre.

== Major projects ==
- CocoWalk (1990), Miami, USA
- LuLu Mall, Trivandrum (2019), India
- Power Plant Mall (2000), Rockwell Center, Makati, Philippines
- Odyssseum (2009), Montpellier, France
- Arena Centar (2010), Zagreb, Croatia
- Morocco Mall (2011), Casablanca, Morocco
- Galeries Lafayette (2011), Casablanca, Morocco
- Fountainebleau Deluxe Mall (2017), Cairo, Egypt
