= Alexander Kreuter =

Alexander Kreuter (29 November 1886, Speyer – 27 September 1977) was an influential German business lawyer and banker during the Nazi occupation of France.

== Education and early career ==
Kreuter studied law and political science at the Ludwig-Maximilians-Universität München from 1906 and was awarded a doctorate by Walther Lotz in 1909. He was a civil commissioner for the province of Leuven in occupied Belgium during World War I. In 1918, he was advisor to the Armistice Commission and the delegation for the Peace Treaty of Versailles for economic and financial matters.

In 1919, he was commissioner for raw materials and products of the "Dictatorial Economic Committee". In 1922, he became a member of the Provisional Reich Economic Council. He negotiated the German-Dutch financial agreement of 11 May 1920 with the Dutch government. After leaving the civil service, he founded the trust administration for the German-Dutch financial agreement GmbH ("Tredefina"), which he headed for over fifty years. For his services as head of the Tredefina, he was appointed by the Dutch government to command the Order of Orange-Nassau.

Kreuter was the Berlin representative of the New York investment bank Dillon, Read & Co. and for many years personally liable partner of the "Deutsche Kreditsicherungs-KG in Berlin, later Düsseldorf, which received a 10 million dollar loan from Dillon, Read & Co. Co. was founded in the 1920s."

== Nazi era activities ==
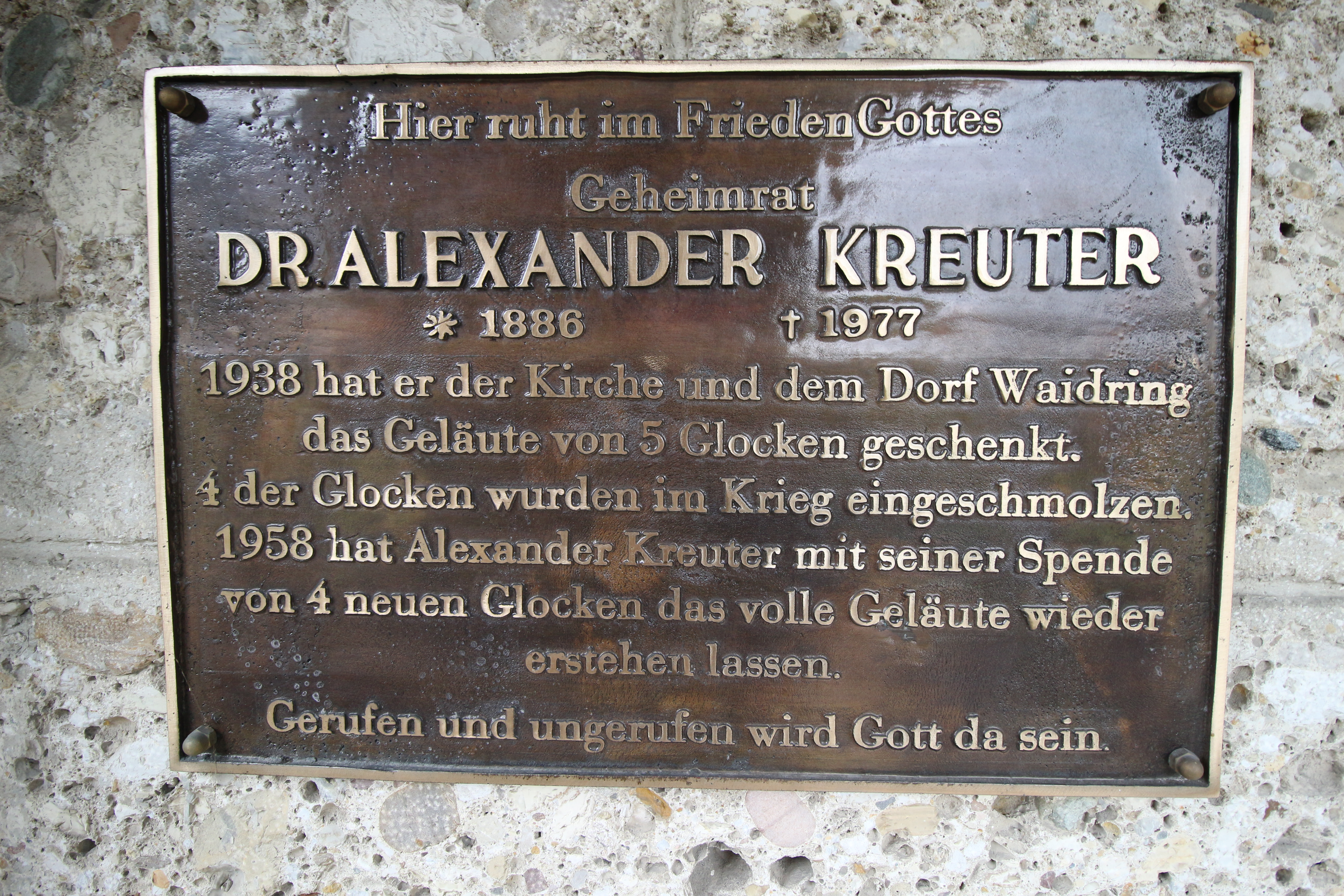
Memorial plaque for Alexander Kreuter in Waidring, Tyrol

During the World War II, Kreuter, a member of the General SS, was a German financial official in Nazi-occupied Paris, working in the foreign intelligence service headed by Walter Schellenberg in Office VI of the Reich Security Main Office (RSHA) of the Nazi SS.

There Kreuter directed inter alia, the "Société de Crédits et d'Investissements" (SCI), the "Aryanized" former "Société Financière pour l'Étranger" (SFE), which was funded by a capital increase in July, financed mainly by Tredefina and to a lesser extent by Barclays Bank. In 1942, it was renamed “Société de Crédits et d'Investissements” and was henceforth controlled by Tredefina. The funds contributed by Barclays, 200 million francs transferred on 3 July 1942 came from the assets of foreign Jews and were transferred by the German administrators of these companies to the French subsidiary of Barclays by order of the German military administration in France. From there, the funds found their way through Treuverkehr Deutsche Treuhand AG in Paris and Seligman Frères & Cie. to Kreuters SCI.

With funds from Tredefina, the SCI acquired “aryanized” shares in French companies, including the Société des Schistes Bitumineux d’Autun, which exploited the oil shale at Autun, and the department store chain Galeries Lafayette.

He was also head of the German subsidiary of Bank Worms et Cie, and closely associated with the Vichy government.

The OSS Art Looting Investigation Unit included Kreuter in its list of Red Flag Names in 1945.

== Post-war controversies ==
After the Allied victory over Nazi Germany, the US military government employed Kreuter despite his being listed in the records of the SS as a contributing member. American newspapers were critical of Kreuter's involvement. In his nationally syndicated column, Drew Pearson wrote in 1947:

When Dillon Read's General Draper was in Germany after the war ended, one of the first things he did was to appoint to his staff a former Dillon Read representative in Germany, Dr. Alexander Kreuter. Kreuter had been a contributing member of Hitler' famous SS corp, but despite this Draper put him on his personal staff.

James Stewart Martin, Chief of the Decartelization Branch for Military Government in Germany after World War II, said in his book All Honorable Men: The Story of the Men on Both Sides of the Atlantic Who Successfully Thwarted Plans to Dismantle the Nazi Cartel System, that the director of the financial division, Jack Bennet, had questioned Kreuter's employment and requested a stop order on Kreuter's travels until his SS record could be cleared up. Kreuter claimed that "his connection with the storm trooper organisation had been purely nominal and for business reasons only."

After his death in 1977, Kreuter was buried in the former chapel of the dead in Waidring.

== Honors ==
Kreuter was awarded the Bavarian Order of Merit on 15 December 1959. In February 1967 he received the Grand Cross of Merit with Star of the Order of Merit of the Federal Republic of Germany for his services to the Art History Institute in Florence; since 1960 he had been treasurer of the Association for the Promotion of the Art History Institute in Florence. In 1967, he became an honorary member of the Bavarian Academy of Fine Arts.

== Family ==
Kreuter was married to the art historian Helga Kreuter-Eggemann, whom he met in occupied France when she was working for the Nazi looting organisation Reichsleiter Rosenberg's (ERR) stealing art in France for the Nazis from 1941 to 1944.

== Publications ==
- Zur Preisbildung in der Linienreederei. Ein Beitrag zur Morphologie des Seefrachtenmarktes. Munich 1909 (Dissertation)

== See also ==
- Aryanization
- Vichy France
- The Holocaust in France

== Literature ==
- James Stewart Martin: All Honorable Men. Little, Brown, Boston 1950, S. 205–208 Volltext (PDF; 4,6 MB)
- Annie Lacroix-Riz: Industriels et banquiers français sous l'Occupation (Neue, überarbeitete Ausgabe), Arman Colin, Paris, 2013, ISBN 978-2-200-28891-4
- Burkhardt Göres: Kunstwerke für das Schloß. Eine Schenkung zum Gedächtnis an Geheimrat Dr. Alexander Kreuter. In: Museumsjournal 14, 1 (2000) 43–45 mit Bild
- Christina Giannini: I giorni dell’alluvione al Kunsthistorisches Institut dalla corrispondenza di Alexander Kreuter e Hans Martin von Erffa. In: Mitteilungen des Kunsthistorischen Institutes in Florenz 54, 1 (2010/12), S. 196–206
