= Alex Vömel =

German gallery owner

Alexander Vömel,
- Born: 23 September 1897; Emmishofen, Switzerland
- Died: 25 June 1985 (aged 87); Düsseldorf, West Germany
- Occupation: Gallery owner

Alexander Vömel, or Voemel (23 September 1897 – 20 June 1985), was a German gallery owner and Nazi party member who took over the gallery of the Jewish art dealer Alfred Flechtheim when it was Aryanized in 1933.

== Early life ==
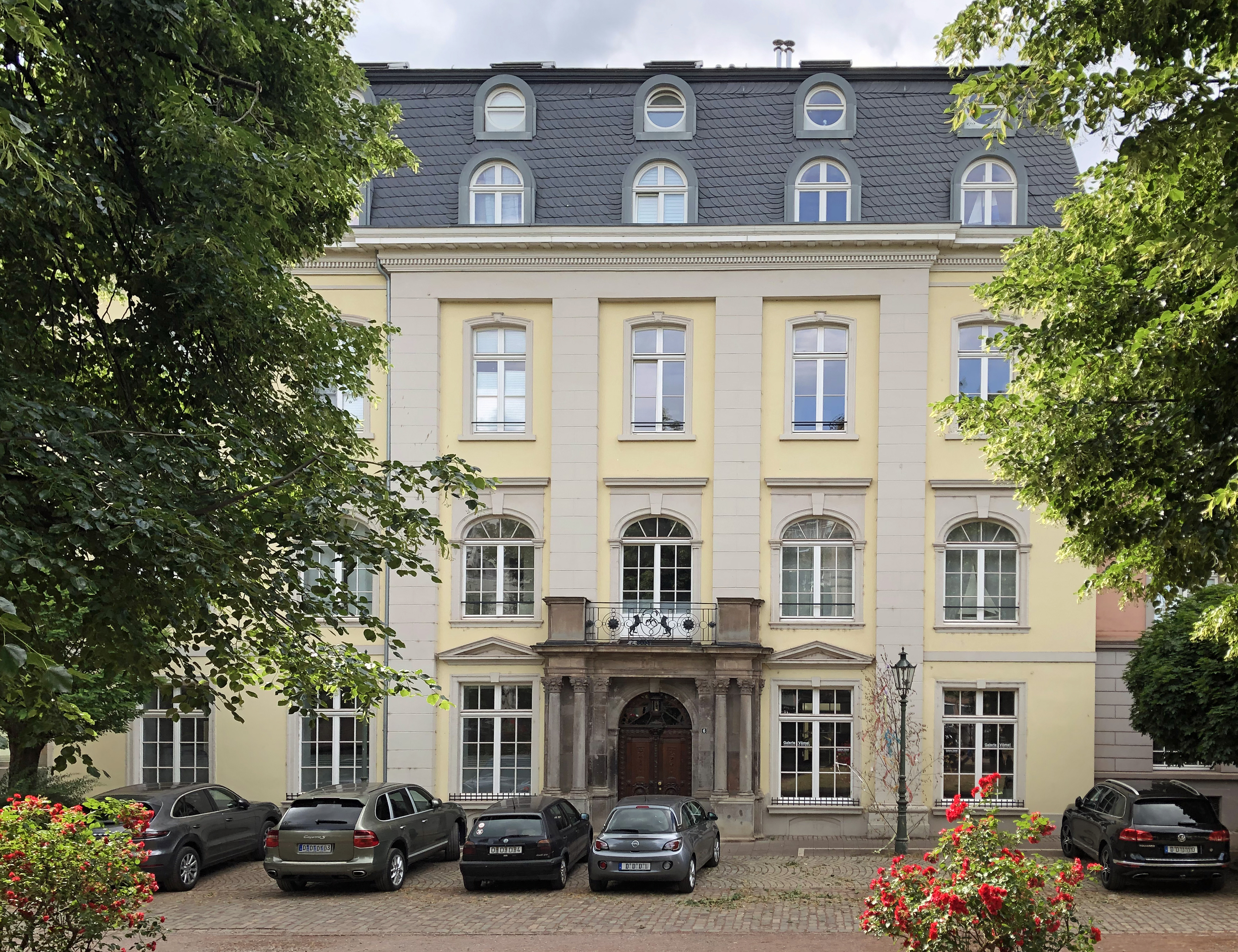
Galerie Vömel, Orangeriestraße 6 (2020)

Vömel was the son of the Protestant pastor Alexander Vömel (1863–1949) from Frankfurt and Elisabeth, née Bartels (1863–1922). He was born in Emmishofen. After a grammar school in Konstanz, he attended a private military school in Frankfurt in 1916. In the First World War he fought as an officer and was wounded. Early on he became a member of the Stahlhelm, Bund der Frontsoldaten, a monarchist, far right veterans association.

After apprenticing as a bookseller, from 1920 to 1922 in Frankfurt at "Reitz & Kölher" at Schillerstraße 15, he began working for Alfred Flechtheim in December 1922. In 1924, Alex Vömel was sent for six months to Daniel-Henry Kahnweiler's gallery in Paris and in 1926 he became managing director.

In 1927, Vömel married Martha Suermondt (1897–1976), née Compes and widow of the art collector Edwin Suermondt, whose collection later traded under the name "Sammlung Suermondt-Vömel".

== Nazi-era 1933–1945 ==
When the Nazis came to power in 1933, they immediately targeted Vömel's employer, the Jewish modernist art dealer Alfred Flechtheim, for persecution. In one of the first Aryanizations in Nazi Germany, Flechtheim was forced out of his gallery and Vömel, who joined the Nazi party, took over. Vömel changed the name of Flechtheim's Düsseldorf gallery to "Galerie Alex Vömel", writing to "his special friend and art dealer Christoph Bernoulli in Basel that he was making great alterations to the gallery, and 'when it's all over the Düsseldorf gallery will be changed to Galerie Alex Vömel from March 30.' "

=== The Aryanization controversy ===
The circumstances surrounding the seizure of Flechtheim's property and its transfer to Vömel has been a matter of debate in numerous lawsuits. Art historians testifying for the families of Jewish victims have said that Vomel Aryanized Flechtheim's gallery, seized property for himself and sold artworks that belonged to Flechtheim as his own, while Flechtheim died in poverty as a refugee in London.

While admitting that Vömel took over Flechtheim's gallery and joined the Nazi Party, art historians testifying on behalf of museums have described Vömel's role was to help Flechtheim and to support modern artists. The German Lost Art Foundation has written that Vömel "was wrongly regarded as the ariseur of the Flechtheim Gallery, whose liquidator was Alfred Schulte, who was commissioned by Flechtheim."

== Post war activities ==
In 1946 Vömel restarted the gallery, initially on the first floor above the Franzen porcelain shop at Königsallee 42. On 10 October 1950 Vömel attempted to claim artworks by Carl Barthe, Paul Klee, Juan Gris, Karl Hofer, Pablo Picasso and other artists that he had seen mentioned in a newspaper article from the occupation authorities, however William Daniels, head of the Wiesbaden Central Collecting Point, dismissed the claim, stating, "We regret to have to inform you that no paintings or drawings of the artists mentioned in your letter nor bronze sculptures by Renée Sintenis or any ivory sculptures originating from the Kongo are at present held in the Wiesbaden Collecting Point, apart from those few of known origin which could not have come from your country house at Düren".

Vömel died in 1985 in Düsseldorf.

In 1953, his son Edwin (born 1928) entered the gallery business. In 1969 the gallery opened in the then newly built Kö-Center. After his father's death, Edwin moved the gallery to Orangeriestraße 6 (Carlstadt) in 1996.

In 2014–2015, a German Lost Art Foundation research project investigated the provenance of the paintings and sculptures acquired between 1933 and 1945 for the Städtische Kunstsammlung Chemnitz and the "Kunsthütte zu Chemnitz" art association—predecessors to the Kunstsammlungen Chemnitz, and Vömel was one of the "relevant" people under study.

== Nazi-looted art and restitutions ==
Vömel's name has appeared in numerous claims for Nazi-looted art.

The heirs of Vömel's former employer Alfred Flechtheim filed lawsuits to demand the restitution of artworks sold by Vömel after the Aryanization of Flechtheim's gallery. On June 17, 2013, following the recommendation of the Advisory Panel, Oskar Kokoschka's portrait of the actress Tilla Durieux was restituted to Flechtheim's heirs by the Ludwig Museum in Cologne. The Ludwig Museum also restituted drawings by Aristide Maillol, Ernst Barlach, Karl Hofer, Paul Modernsohn-Becker, and Wilhelm Morgner that had been sold by Vömel after the Aryanization of the Flechtheim Gallery. In 2018 the Solomon R. Guggenheim Foundation agreed to restitute Artillerymen (1915), a German Expressionist painting by Ernst Ludwig Kirchner, to the heirs of Alfred Flechtheim, and the Moderna Museet in Stockholm returned a 1910 portrait of Marquis Joseph de Montesquiou-Fezensac by Oskar Kokoschka, which Vomel had sold when the Nazis expropriated the gallery and artwork between 1933 and 1934. The Moderna Museet said: "Vomel, who joined the Nazi party early on, took advantage of his former employer's tragic situation."

== Lawsuits ==
- Hulton v. Staatsgemaldesammlungen

== Publications ==
- Alex Vömel in WorldCat
- Alex Vömel, Daniel-Henry Kahnweiler, Fritz Nathan: Freuden und Leiden eines Kunsthändlers. Düsseldorf 1964.

== Literature ==
- Andrea Bambi, Axel Drecoll: Alfred Flechtheim: Raubkunst und Restitution, De Gruyter, May 2015, ISBN 978-3-11-040497-5
- Yvo Theumissen: Entartete Kunst und privates Ausstellungswesen. Die Galerie Alex Vömel in Düsseldorf, in: Verfolgung und Widerstand im Rheinland und in Westfalen 1933–1945, (Hrsg. v. Anselm Faust), Köln/Stuttgart/Berlin, 1992, S. 234–244
- Roswitha Neu-Kock: Alfred Flechtheim, Alexander Vömel und die Verhältnisse in Düsseldorf 1930 bis 1934, in: Kunst sammeln, Kunst handeln. Beiträge des internationalen Symposiums in Wien (Hrsg. v. Eva Blimlinger und Monika Mayer), Wien 2012, S. 155–166
- Susan Ronald, Hitler's art thief : Hildebrand Gurlitt, the Nazis, and the looting of Europe's treasures
- Jonathan Petropoulos, Bridges from the Reich : the importance of émigré art dealers as reflected in the case studies of Curt Valentin and Otto Kallir-Nirenstein

== See also ==
- List of claims for restitution for Nazi-looted art
- The Holocaust in Germany
