= Monoprix =

French retail chain

- Type: Subsidiary
- Industry: Retail
- Founded: 1932; 94 years ago, in Rouen, France
- Founder: Max Heilbronn
- Headquarters: Clichy, Hauts-de-Seine, France
- Number of locations: 736 (2024)
- Area served: France; Belgium; Kuwait; Lebanon; Luxembourg; Qatar; Tunisia; United Arab Emirates
- Key people: Alfred Hawawini (CEO)
- Brands: Monop'; Monop' Daily; Monop' Beauty; Monop' Station; Naturalia
- Parent: Groupe Casino
- Website: monoprix.fr

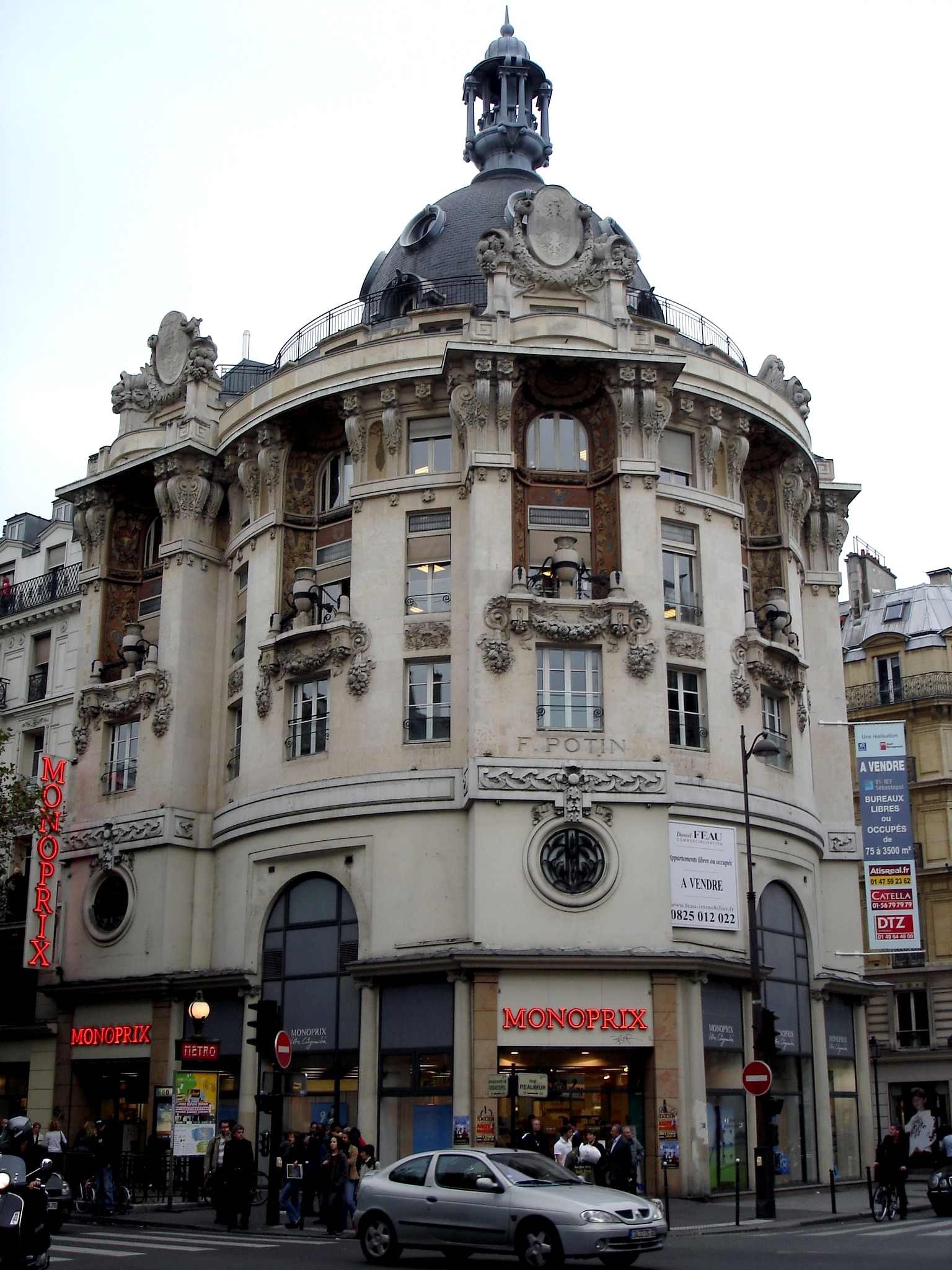
A Monoprix location, which is the former head office of the Félix Potin company, in Paris

Monoprix S.A. (French pronunciation: [mɔnɔpʁi]) is a major French retail chain with its headquarters in Clichy, Hauts-de-Seine, France, near Paris. The company's stores combine food retailing with fashion, beauty and home products.

== History ==
The company was founded in 1932 in Rouen by Max Heilbronn, a son-in-law of Theophile Bader, the founder of Galeries Lafayette.

In 1991, Monoprix acquired the Uniprix brand after Galeries Lafayette took over Nouvelles Galeries, the parent of Uniprix.

In 1997, the chain merged with French retailer Prisunic, in a deal that saw Casino Group acquire a 21% stake in the merged company.

In 2000, Galeries Lafayette, entered into an agreement to sell a 50% interest in Monoprix. Casino Group provided Galeries Lafayette with a put option to sell the remaining 50%. In 2012, after legal wrangling over the value of the put option, the shareholders of both firms agreed on a sale price of $1.6 billion (€1.2 billion). The Autorité de la concurrence, France's competition regulatory body, approved the transaction in 2013, with the condition that the merged group sell 58 stores. This allowed the deal to close, making Monoprix a wholly owned subsidiary of Casino Group.

On 23 May 2019, Rallye S.A., owner of Groupe Casino, declared bankruptcy protection in an effort to maintain its high debt costs. Casino later announced that same day that the bankruptcy would not affect any of their subsidiaries and that operations would continue normally.

In 2020, the French footwear company Panafrica partnered with Monoprix. The partnership was renewed in 2024.

In 2023, Monoprix's parent Casino announced that they have completed a deal to avoid bankruptcy. This restructuring procedure would allow for the company to cut high debt and improve recent losses to other rival supermarket corporations. In 2024, Casino USA filed for Chapter 15 bankruptcy.

Monoprix currently has more than 700 shops in total: most under the Monoprix brand, but also smaller Monop', Monop' Daily, Monop' Station, Monop' Beauty, and Naturalia formats. It has a presence in over 250 towns and cities in France and employs around 21,000 people.

== International branches ==
List of Monoprix international locations (all formats) as of November 2026:

Africa and the Middle East
- Kuwait: 1
- Lebanon: 3
- Mauritius: 1
- Qatar: 9
- Tunisia: 90
- United Arab Emirates: 10
Europe
- Belgium: 2
- Luxembourg: 5

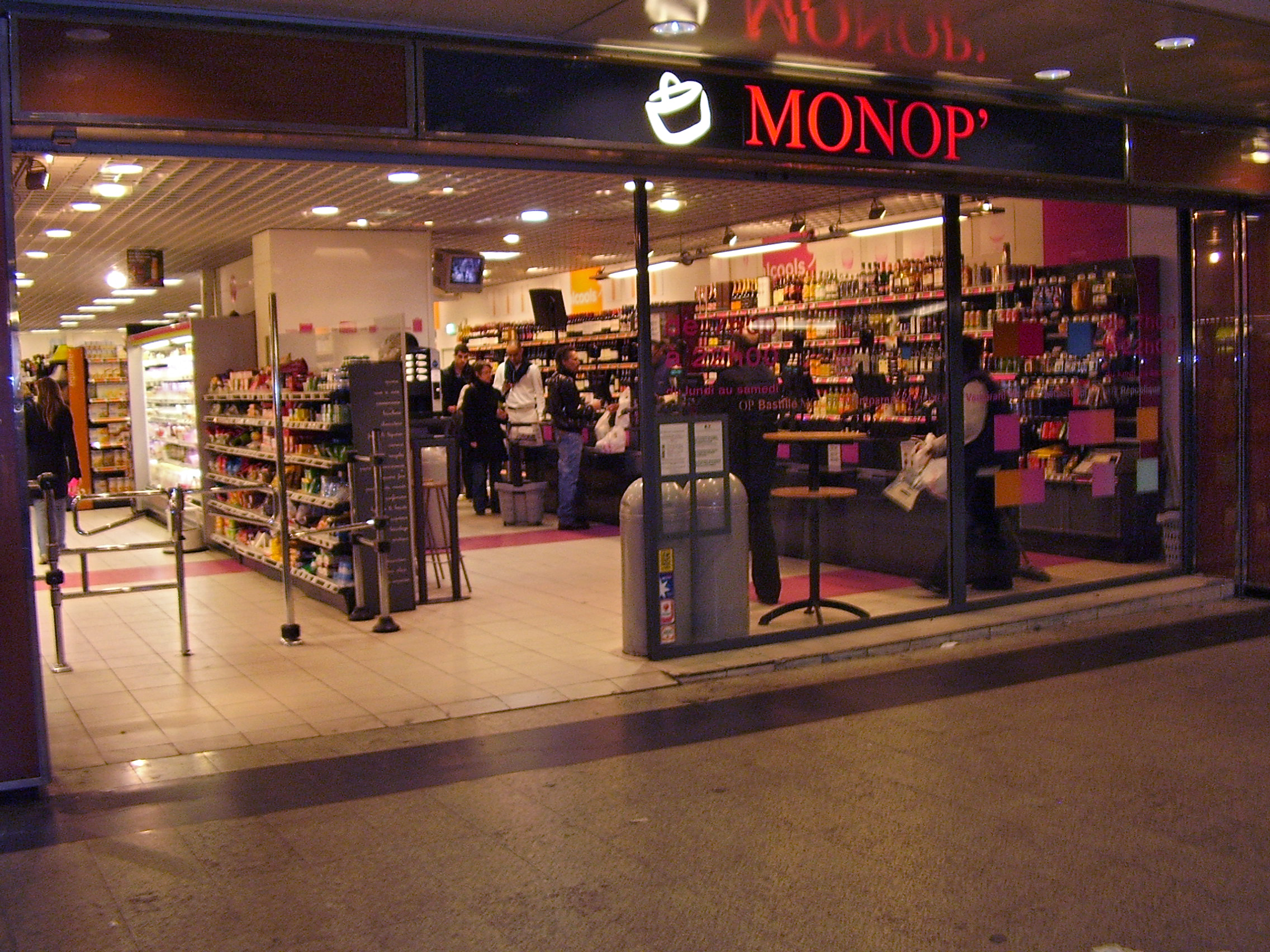
A Monop' location in Paris

Monoprix expanded to Tunisia in 1933, the stores are ran through a separate company. In 1975, Monoprix acquired the Prisunic stores in Mauritius. They would exit the country in 2019, then returning with a store in Rivière Noire in 2025.

In 1999, the first Lebanese store was opened, Monoprix exited Lebanon in 2019. It made its return to the country in December 2025.

Monoprix opened in Andorra in 2009. They have since exited the country. In 2013, Monoprix opened a store in Doha, Qatar. In the same year a store opened in Libya that has since closed.

In 2014, Monoprix entered Luxembourg.

The first Emirati store opened in Abu Dhabi in 2022. This was followed by a store in Kuwait later in the year. In Spring 2024, Monoprix entered Belgium.

It was announced in May 2025, that starting in 2026, 210 Monoprix and Franprix stores will open by 2035 in Morocco, under an agreement with H&S (owned by Moncef Belkhayat). Monoprix had previously operated stores in the country during the 20th century.

Monoprix will enter Egypt in 2026 with a store in New Cairo.

Stores also operate in La Réunion and Guadeloupe.
