= Georges Meyer =

Swiss sprinter

Personal information
- Nationality: Swiss
- Born: 17 April 1914

Sport
- Sport: Sprinting
- Event: 4 × 100 metres relay

Georges Meyer (born 17 April 1914, date of death unknown) was a Swiss sprinter. He competed in the men's 4 × 100 metres relay at the 1936 Summer Olympics.
