= Raoul Meyer =

French businessman and art collector (1892–1970)

Raoul Salomon Meyer
- Born: June 30, 1892; Villefranche-sur-Saône, France
- Died: June 14, 1970 (aged 77); Neuilly-sur-Seine, France
- Military career
- Allegiance: France
- Branch: French Resistance
- Known for: Businessman and anti-Nazi resistance fighter who directed the Galeries Lafayette group
- Conflicts: World War II; *Liberation of Paris

Raoul Salomon Meyer (30 June 1892 in Villefranche-sur-Saône – 14 June 1970 in Neuilly-sur-Seine), was a French businessman and anti-Nazi resistance fighter who directed the Galeries Lafayette group.

== Biography ==
Raoul Meyer was the son-in-law of Théophile Bader, the head of Galeries Lafayette, whose eldest daughter Yvonne he married. After participating in the Resistance and the Liberation of Paris, he took charge of Galeries Lafayette on September 20, 1944, until 1970. He is the grandfather of Rabbi David Meyer.

Raoul Meyer and his wife had an adopted daughter Léone-Noëlle Meyer, whose biological family was murdered in the Holocaust. She became the mother of Rabbi David Meyer.

== Nazi era ==
During the Nazi occupation of France in 1940, Les Galeries Lafayette underwent a process of "Aryanization", that is the removal of Jewish owners and their replacement by non-Jewish owners. Théophile Bader, Raoul Meyer, Max Heilbronn, the store's administrators and 129 Jewish employees were forced to resign. The property of Bader, Meyer and Heilbronn families was taken.

The Galeries Lafayette group was transferred to non-Jewish owners: the Swiss Aubert and the French industrialist Harlachol.

The Meyers hid their art collection in a bank vault in southern France. But the Nazis accessed the vault a year later in 1941 and seized the collection, which also included Camille Pissarro's Bergère rentrant des moutons at least three Renoirs and a Derain.

== Meyer's daughter attempts to recover looted Pissarro ==
In 2014, Raoul Meyer's daughter Léone-Noëlle Meyer sued the University of Oklahoma and the Fred Jones Jr. Museum for the return of the Pissarro painting Shepherdess Bringing in Sheep (La Bergère Rentrant des Moutons) the Nazis had seized. The refusal of the Fred Jones Jr. Museum caused Oklahoma's Republican state representative Mike Reynolds to call on the American Association of Museums to review the museum's accredidation status for violating ethical bylaws. After a long legal battle a settlement was reached in 2016 which specified that the painting be returned to France for five years, after which it was to rotate between France and the Fred Jones Museums every three years. In 2020 Meyers contested the agreement as unworkable, initiating a legal action in a French court. The Fred Jones Jr Museum sued Meyers, demanding that she be fined "$3.5m in the US and face penalties of up to $100,000 a day for contempt of court if she does not halt proceedings in France in which she is seeking full ownership of the impressionist work". On 1 June 2021, Meyer abandoned the fight for her father's painting, relinquishing ownership of the Pissarro to the University of Oklahoma.

== Honors ==
- Chevalier de la Légion d'honneur

== See also ==
- Galeries Lafayette
- La Bergère rentrant des moutons (Camille Pissarro)
- Aryanization
