= Max Heilbronn =

Max Heilbronn dit Harrel, alias Hennequin, born in Paris on December 17, 1902, and died in Paris XVI on May 12, 1998, was a leader of the French Resistance and the creator of Monoprix single-price stores.

== Biography ==
=== Education and early career ===
Max Heilbronn was an engineer who graduated from the École Centrale Paris, class of 1924.

Heilbronn married Paulette Bader (1905–1998) in 1926, becoming the son-in-law of Théophile Bader, founder of Galeries Lafayette. In 1927, the couple gave birth to their only daughter, Ginette. In 1932, he launched Monoprix in Rouen.

=== Nazi occupation of France ===
After the Nazi defeat of France in 1940, Les Galeries Lafayette was "Aryanized", that is, all the Jewish owners were removed and replaced by non-Jews. Théophile Bader and his sons-in-laws, Raoul Meyer and Max Heilbronn, all three administrators of the store, as well as 129 Jewish employees were forced to resign. The Bader, Meyer and Heilbronn families were dispossessed of their property.

In their place, the Swiss Aubert and the French industrialist Harlachol managed the Galeries Lafayette group. Heilbronn and Meyer joined the Resistance.

Heilbronn, a reserve captain in the Railway Engineers, had devised a plan to sabotage the French railway network which was being used by the Nazis. Heilbronn and René Hardy, head of the NAP-fer in the southern zone, put together a plan of action, called the Green Plan, so named because the text was typed on green paper.

On June 12, 1943, just after an interview with Hardy and René La Combe, Heilbronn was arrested by the Intelligence agency of the SS and the Nazi Party known as the Sicherheitsdienst. He was imprisoned in Lyon and then in Compiègne, before being deported to Buchenwald on January 3, 1944.

From Buchenwald, he was transported to the Natzweiler (Struthof) camp, then to Erzingen (Natzweiler kommando), and finally to Allach (Dachau kommando) where he was liberated on April 30, 1945.

=== Post-war and death ===
Max Heilbronn was president of Galeries Lafayette from 1945 to 1971. His son-in-law, Etienne Moulin (1912–2004), whom he knew in Buchenwald and who married his daughter Ginette in 1947, succeeded him at the head of the group. Max died on May 12, 1998, at the age of 95.

== Bibliography ==
- Max Heilbronn, Galeries Lafayette Buchenwald Galeries Lafayette, Economica, 1989.
- Henri Frenay, La Nuit Finira, Laffont, 1973.
- Claude Bourdet, L'Aventure incertaine, Stock, 1975.
- Chauvy, Gérard (1991). Histoire secrète de l'Occupation (in French). Paris: Payot. p. 349. ISBN 978-2-228-88329-0..
