= Fred Jones Jr. Museum of Art =

Museum in Norman, Oklahoma

Coordinates: 35.22°N 97.44°W

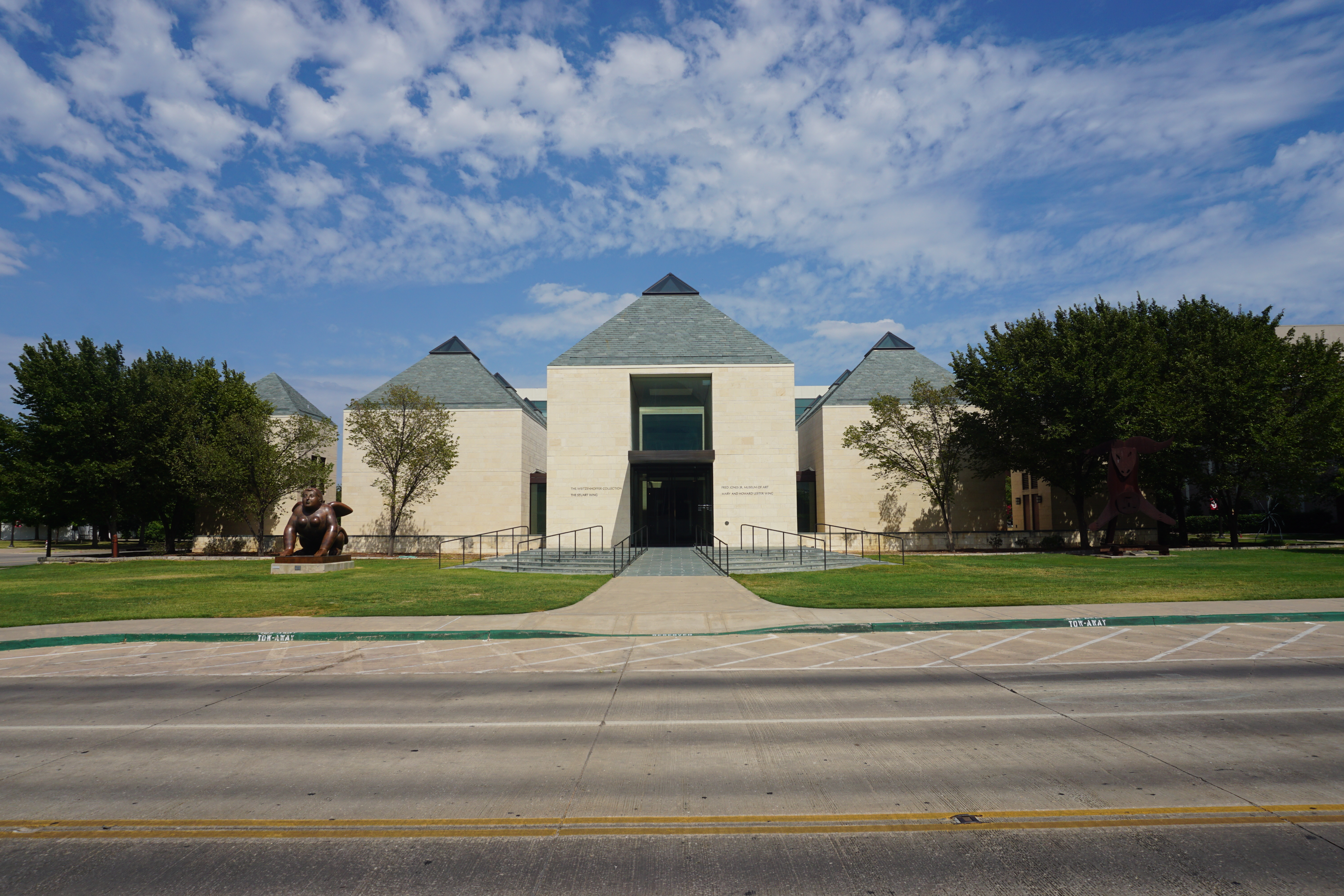
- Former name: Oklahoma University Museum of Art
- Established: 1926
- Dissolved: 1971
- Location: University of Oklahoma campus, Norman, Oklahoma
- Type: Art
- Collections: Weitzenhoffer Collection, Fleischaker Collection, McGhee Collection, Thams Collection, State Department Collection, Eugene B. Adkins Collection, James T. Bialac Native American Art Collection,
- Founder: Oscar Jacobson
- Owner: University of Oklahoma
- Website: www.ou.edu/fjjma.html

The Fred Jones Jr. Museum of Art is an art museum on the University of Oklahoma campus in Norman, Oklahoma.

== Overview ==
The University of Oklahoma's Fred Jones Jr. Museum of Art holds over 20,000 objects in its permanent collection. The museum collection also includes French Impressionism, 20th-century American painting and sculpture, traditional and contemporary Native American art, the art of the Southwest, ceramics, photography, contemporary art, Asian art, and graphics from the 16th century to the present.

== History ==
The Oklahoma University Museum of Art, the forerunner of the Fred Jones Jr. Museum was founded in 1936 by OU art professor Oscar Jacobson, who became the museum's first director and served in that post until his retirement in 1950. (Note: Anders Oscar Jacobson (1882–1966) was a Swedish-born artist who immigrated with his family to Lindsborg, Kansas in 1890. He joined the OU faculty as an art professor in 1915. The museum originally featured only 250 works, all collected by Jacobson. After a donation later that year of hundreds of pieces of East and Central Asian art by oilman Lew Wentz and photographer Gordon Matzene of Ponca City, Oklahoma, the university moved the museum to the former library building, which is now Jacobson Hall. Under Jacobson's tenure as director, the museum greatly expanded its collection of Native American art, including many works by the Kiowa Six, who had studied under Jacobson in the late 1920s. Jacobson remained as director until his retirement in 1952.)

The collection continued to grow, and in 1971, a new building was built called the Fred Jones Jr. Memorial Art Center. In 1992 it was renamed the Fred Jones Jr. Museum of Art. When David L. Boren became OU's president in 1994, he and his wife Molly Shi Boren began a campaign to expand the museum's collections.

In 2000 a gift of the Weitzenhoffer Collection of French Impressionism was made to the museum. In 2003, construction began to expand the museum with the addition of a new wing that was completed in 2005. The new "hut like" wing doubled the museum size; it was designed by Washington, D.C.–based architect Hugh Jacobsen. The new addition is named in honor of Mary and Howard Lester of San Francisco.

In 2007, the Fred Jones Jr. Museum of Art and the Philbrook Museum of Art were named stewards of the Eugene B. Adkins Collection. To properly display OU's portion of the collection, the university began construction in 2009 on a new level above the original structure. Opened in October 2011, the new 18,000 square-foot wing houses collections acquired within the past 15 years. Designed by architect Rand Elliott, the addition is named the Stuart Wing to honor a gift from the Stuart Family Foundation. The construction included renovations to the original 1971 building and the addition of the Eugene B. Adkins Gallery, a new photography gallery and new administrative offices. The total museum exhibition space is approximately 40,000 square feet (3,700 m^{2}).

Ghislain d'Humières served as the Wylodean and Bill Saxon Director from 2007 to 2013. Emily Ballew Neff was appointed Wylodean and Bill Saxon Director and Chief Curator from 2013 to 2014. In 2015, Mark White was named the Wylodean and Bill Saxon Director and Eugene B. Adkins Curator. White resigned from the position in April 2020.

== Claim for Nazi-looted Pissarro ==
Pissarro's Shepherdess Bringing in Sheep has been the object of several restitution claims. Prior to its seizure by Nazis during the German occupation of France, it was owned by Raoul and Yvonne Meyer, heirs to the French department store Galeries Lafayette. Raoul Meyer's attempts to recover it after the war in Switzerland failed, and in 2014 his adopted daughter, Léone-Noëlle Meyer, filed a lawsuit against the Fred Jones Jr. Museum and the University of Oklahoma to reclaim the painting. The refusal of the museum caused Oklahoma's Republican state representative Mike Reynolds to call on the American Association of Museums to review the museum's accreditation status for violating ethical bylaws.

In 2016, after a long legal battle, Meyer arrived at a settlement with the Fred Jones Jr. Museum of Art, recovering the painting and bringing it back to France where it was exhibited by the Orsay Museum in Paris. However, the settlement specified that after five years, the Pissarro should return to Oklahoma, and that the process of transferring the painting be repeated every three years in a kind of shared custody agreement. In 2020, Léone-Noëlle Meyer initiated a lawsuit in a French court to stop the rotations of the painting between Paris and Oklahoma. The Musée d'Orsay expressed the difficulties and cost involved in the project. The Fred Jones Jr Museum then sued Meyer, demanding that she be fined "$3.5m in the US and face penalties of up to $100,000 a day for contempt of court if she does not halt proceedings in France in which she is seeking full ownership of the impressionist work".

"At the end of the day what the [Oklahoma] museum wants is to have the painting on the wall," said Olivier de Baecque, the university's lawyer in Paris.

On 1 June 2021, after years of litigation, Meyer abandoned ownership of the Pissarro painting to the Fred Jones Jr. Museum.

"The important question is to ask why Oklahoma has been fighting for the past decade not to restitute a painting that they do not contest is of dubious origin, that they do not contest was taken from Mrs Meyer's adopted father by the Nazis?" Meyer's French lawyer, Ron Soffer, said.

== Collections ==
The main collections are:

- The Weitzenhoffer Collection: a collection of paintings by Impressionists, including Edgar Degas, Claude Monet, Mary Cassatt, Vincent van Gogh, Camille Pissarro, and Pierre-Auguste Renoir.
- The Fleischaker Collection: a collection of more than 350 pieces of Native American and southwestern paintings, sculpture and ceramics, including works by Russian Taos painters Leon Gaspard and Nicolai Fechin.
- The McGhee Collection: features Eastern Orthodox icons dating back to the 15th century.
- The Thams Collection: containing 32 paintings by members of the Taos Society of Artists.
- The State Department Collection was purchased by the museum in 1948 from the controversial Advancing American Art collection. Part of the "cultural Marshall Plan," this traveling exhibit was created by the Department's Office of International Information and Cultural Affairs to demonstrate to the world America's cultural diversity and cosmopolitanism in the mid 20th century. Critics stated the exhibition portrayed an unflattering image of American life and found leftist sentiment in many of the paintings. The exhibition was dismantled by congress in 1947, after only two years, and sold to various institutions. The collection includes works by Georgia O'Keeffe and Edward Hopper.
- The Eugene B. Adkins Collection: includes more than 400 paintings by American artists and examples of Native American paintings, pottery and jewelry.
- The James T. Bialac Native American Art Collection: given to the museum in 2010, the collection includes works by North America's indigenous cultures, in particular, the Pueblos of the Southwest, Navajo, Hopi, Northern and Southern Plains tribes and the Southeastern tribes. Included in the collection are approximately 2,600 paintings and works on paper, over 1,000 kachinas and approximately 400 works of varying media, including ceramics and jewelry. Works by Native artists including Fred Kabotie, Awa Tsireh, Fritz Scholder, Joe Herrera, Allan Houser, Jerome Tiger, Tonita Pena, Helen Hardin, Pablita Velarde, George Morrison, Patrick DesJarlait and Pop Chalee are represented.

== Gallery ==
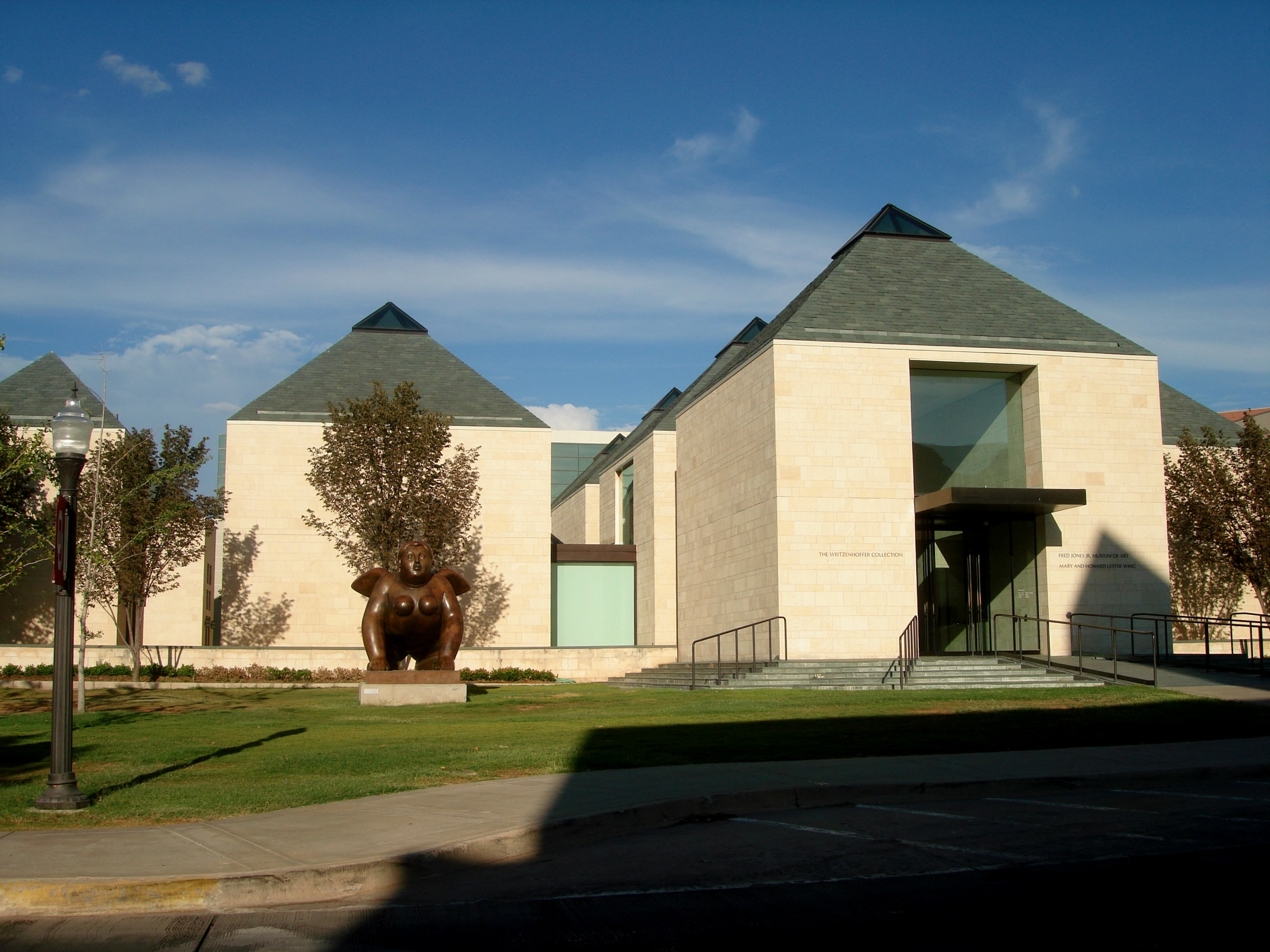
Fred Jones Jr. Museum of Art - University of Oklahoma and "Sphinx", a monumental sculpture by Colombian artist Fernando Botero.
Photo courtesy of Marelblu. July 15, 2012.

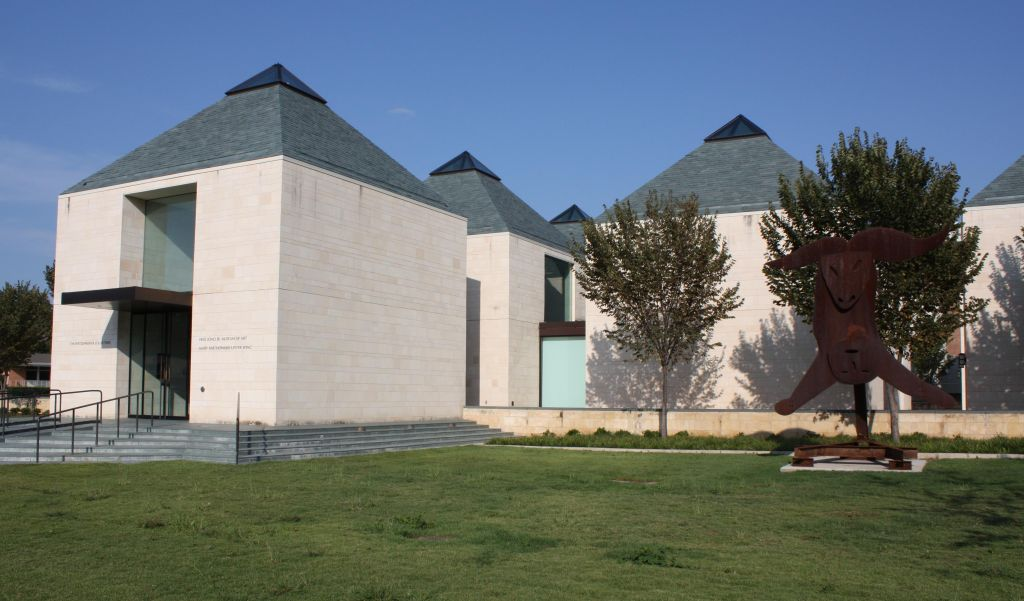
Fred Jones Jr. Museum of Art, 2009

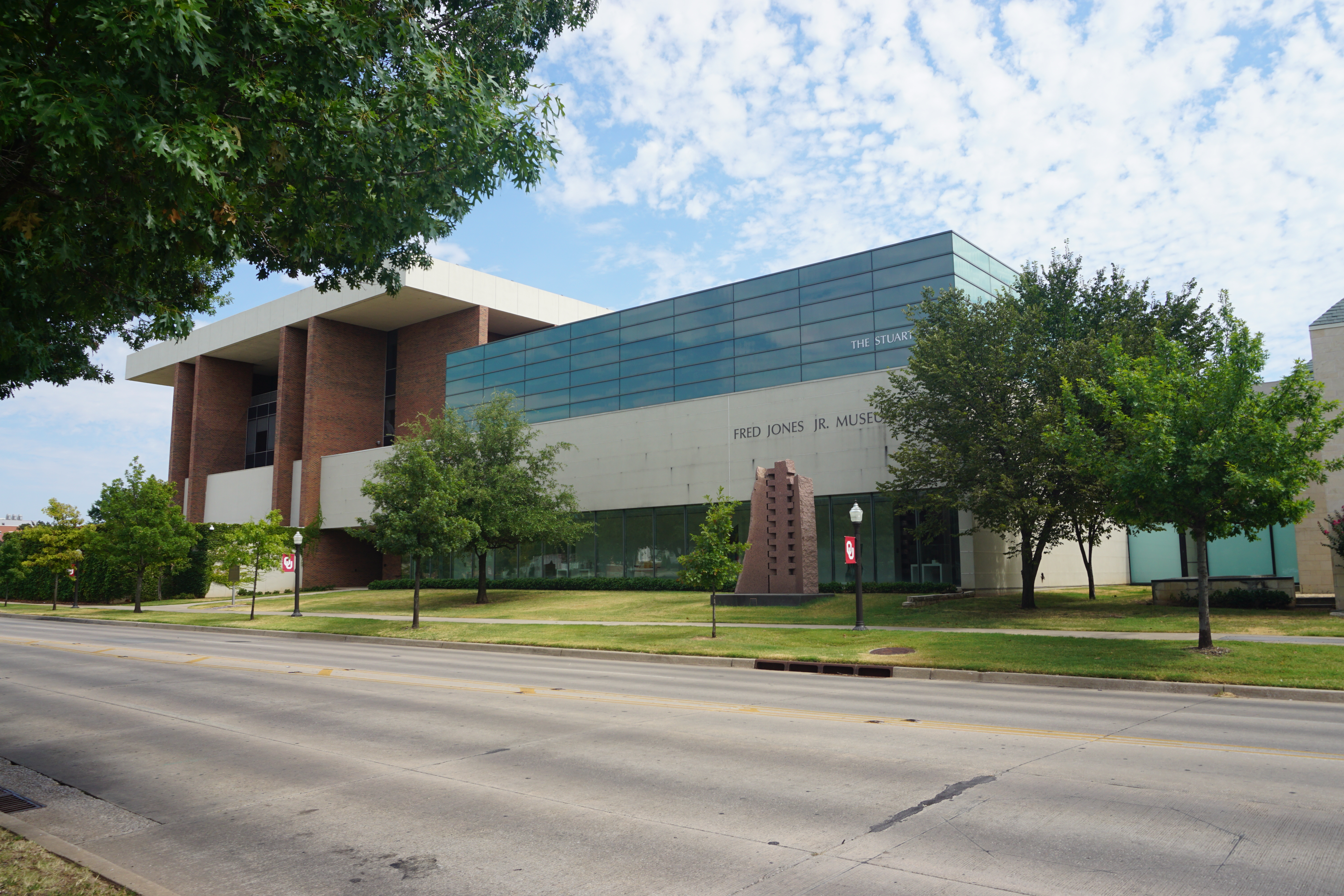
The Stuart Wing

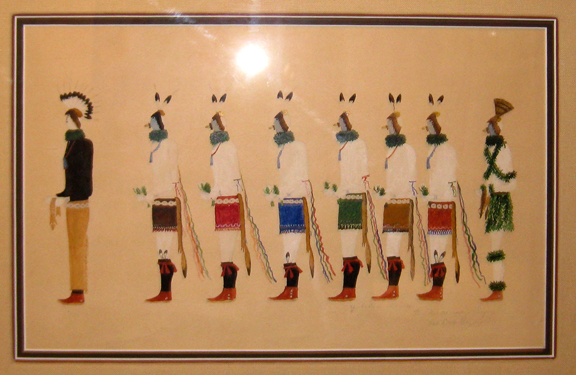
Yei'bichai Dances, by Apie Begay (Navajo), watercolor on paper, 19th century, collection of the Fred Jones Jr. Museum of Art

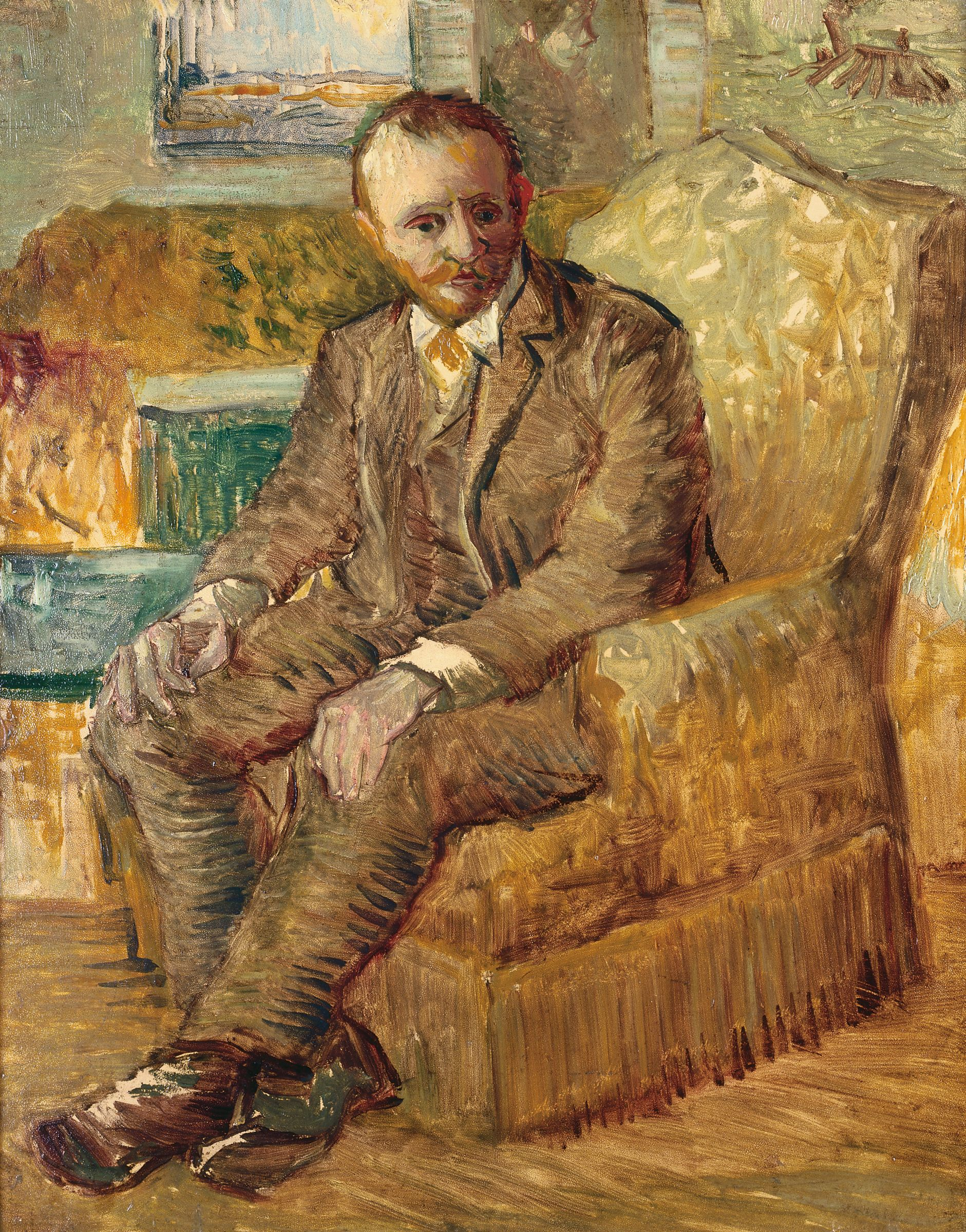
Portrait of Alexander Reid by Van Gogh

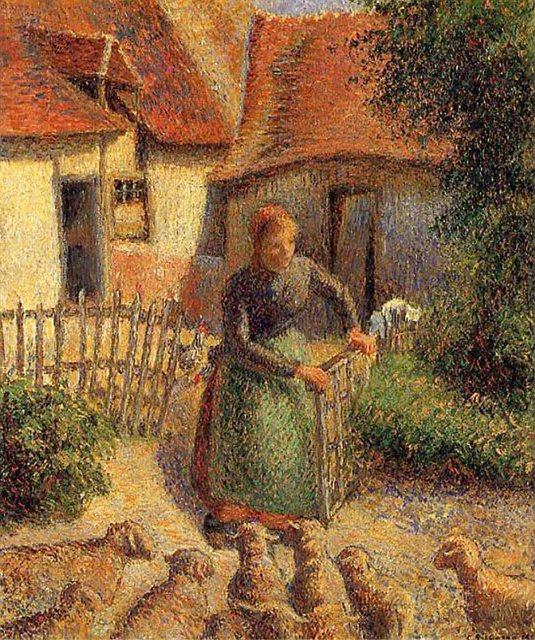
Bergère rentrant des moutons (Shepherdess Bringing in Sheep) by Pissarro

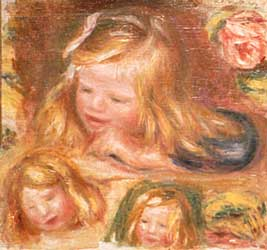
Coco (Claude) by Renoir

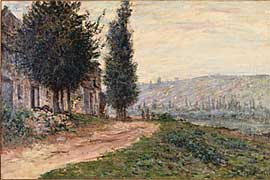
La Berge à Lavacourt (Riverbank at Lavacourt) by Monet

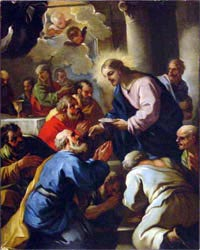
The Last Supper by Giordano
