= Morocco Mall =

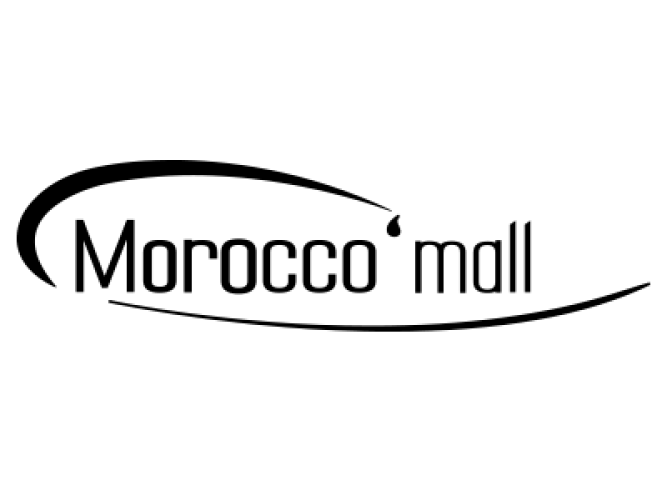

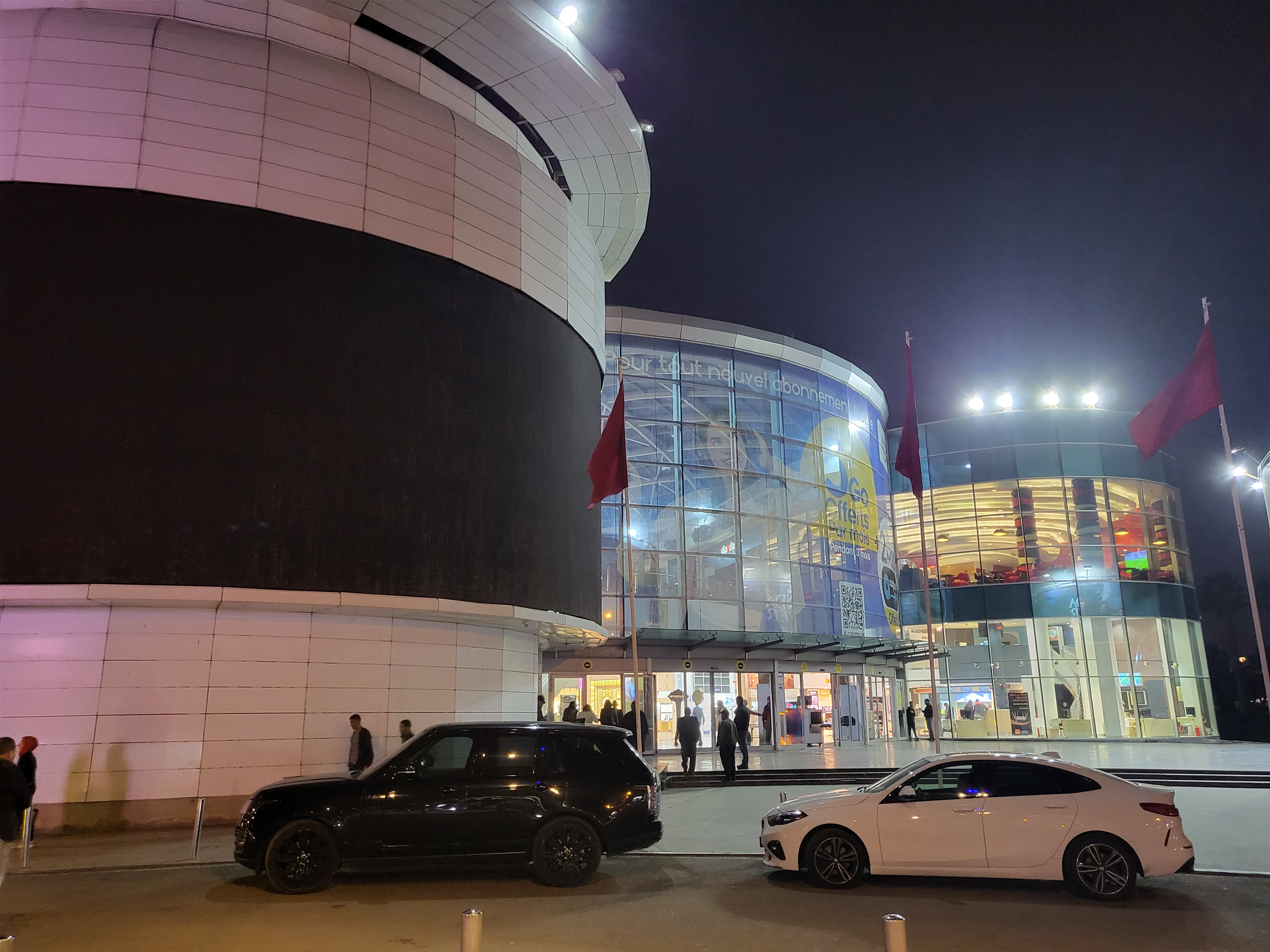
- Location: Casablanca, Morocco
- Coordinates: 33°34′32.63″N 7°42′25.04″W
- Opened: 1 December 2011
- Developer: Groupes Aksal, Nesk Investment et famille Akhnouch
- Manager: Groupes Aksal, Nesk Investment et famille Akhnouch
- Owner: Groupes Aksal, Nesk Investment et famille Akhnouch
- Architect: Design International
- Num. of stores: 350+
- Floor area: 2,000,000 square feet (190,000 m^{2})
- Floors: 3
- Parking: 5000+
- Website: moroccomall.net

Morocco Mall (Arabic: مول المغرب) is the largest shopping mall in Africa with 590000 m^{2} of floor space in Casablanca, Morocco. Morocco Mall, which opened on December 1, 2011, was designed by architect Davide Padoa of Design International, a global architecture boutique with its headquarters in London. Kuncara Wicaksana under the principal of Davide Padoa developed the Architectural Concept until the Design Development stage. The project site coordination was led by Miguel Fernandes and Catia Zizzi

== Architecture ==
Morocco Mall was designed by CEO and principal architect of architecture firm, Design International.

== Aquadream ==
The mall features a massive 1,000,000 L (220,000 imp gal; 260,000 U.S. gal) aquarium that contains over 40 different species of fish. The aquarium is called "Aquadream" and was designed and built by International Concept Management (ICM). Visitors have the opportunity to take a ride through the centre of the cylinder shaped aquarium with a 360-degree view of the sea life. Visitors can also go scuba diving with a professional instructor inside the aquarium.

== Awards ==
Morocco Mall has won the following awards:

- 2012 ICSC- Design & Development (Gold)
- 2012 MIPIM- Best Shopping Centre
- 2012 MAPIC- Best Retail & Leisure Development
- 2012 Global RLI Awards- Most Innovative Retail & Leisure Concept
- "The largest in-store shop facade"- Guinness World Records The year though, is unknown to all.
- 2011 Africa Property Awards- Best Retail Development Morocco
- 2011 African Property Awards- Best Retail Development in Africa
