= Shepherdess Bringing in Sheep =

Painting by Camille Pissarro

- La Bergère Rentrant des Moutons (French)
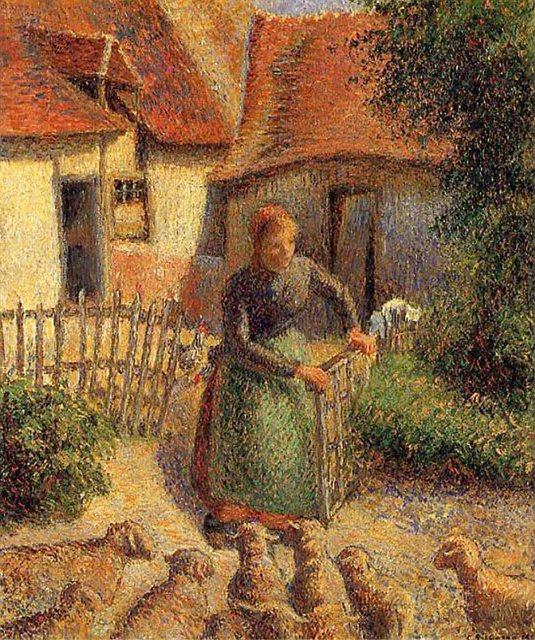
- Artist: Camille Pissarro
- Year: 1886
- Dimensions: 46 cm × 38 cm (18 in × 15 in)
- Location: Fred Jones Jr. Museum of Art

Shepherdess Bringing in the Sheep (French: La Bergère Rentrant des Moutons) is a painting by Camille Pissarro from 1886.

== Ownership dispute ==
Looted by the Nazis from Raoul Meyer during the German occupation of France, the Pissarro painting was the object of a restitution claim by Raoul Meyer after the war against the art dealer Christoph Bernoulli and again decades later by his daughter, Léone-Noëlle Meyer, against the Fred Jones Jr. Museum at the University of Oklahoma. The museum fought the claim. A settlement was reached in 2016 which involved the circulation of the Pissarro between the Fred Jones Jr. Museum of Art and the Musée d'Orsay. The settlement was later called into question and the case landed back in court. On 1 June 2021, after years of litigation, Meyer abandoned ownership of the Pissarro painting to the Fred Jones Jr. Museum.

== See also ==
- List of paintings by Camille Pissarro

== Sources ==
- Joachim Pissarro et Claire Durand-Ruel Snollaerts, Pissarro - Catalogue critique des peintures.Volume III.
