= Galeries Lafayette =

French department store chain

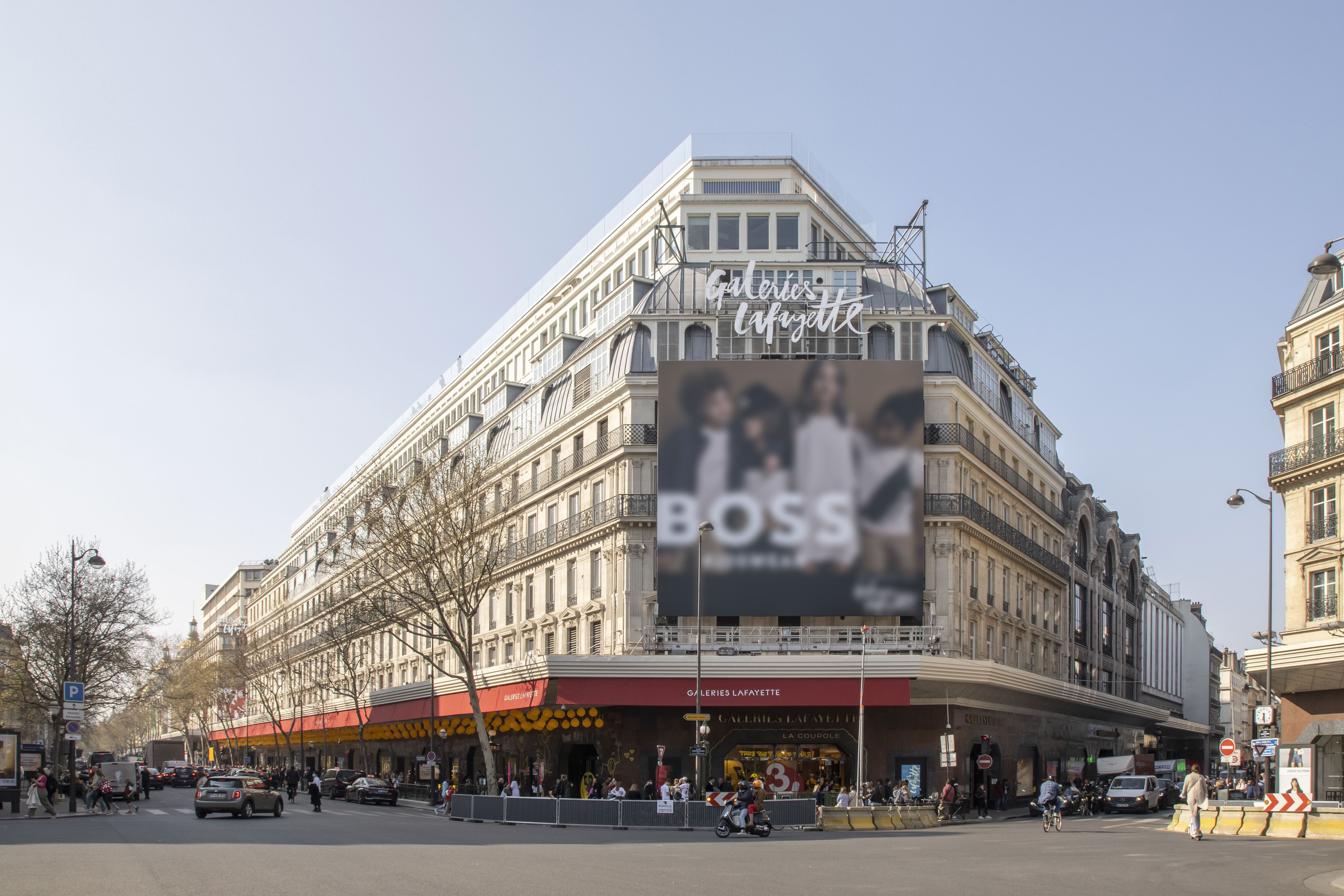
- Flagship store located Boulevard Haussmann in Paris, 2022
- Type: Subsidiary
- Industry: Retail
- Founded: 1894 (132 years ago) in Paris, France
- Founder: Théophile Bader and Alphonse Kahn
- Headquarters: Paris, France
- Number of locations: 60 (2025)
- Area served: China; France; India; Indonesia; Luxembourg; Macau; Qatar; United Arab Emirates
- Key people: Arthur Lemoine (CEO)
- Parent: Galeries Lafayette Group
- Website: galerieslafayette.com

Galeries Lafayette (French pronunciation: [ɡalʁi lafajɛt]) is an upmarket French department store chain. The flagship store is located on Boulevard Haussmann in the 9th arrondissement of Paris. It is part of Groupe Galeries Lafayette and has been a member of the International Association of Department Stores since 1960.

As of 2026, Galeries Lafayette operates 50 stores in France (including five in Greater Paris, and 12 outlet stores), alongside nine international locations (predominantly in Asia). Galeries Lafayette is the largest European upmarket department store chain by store count.

== History ==
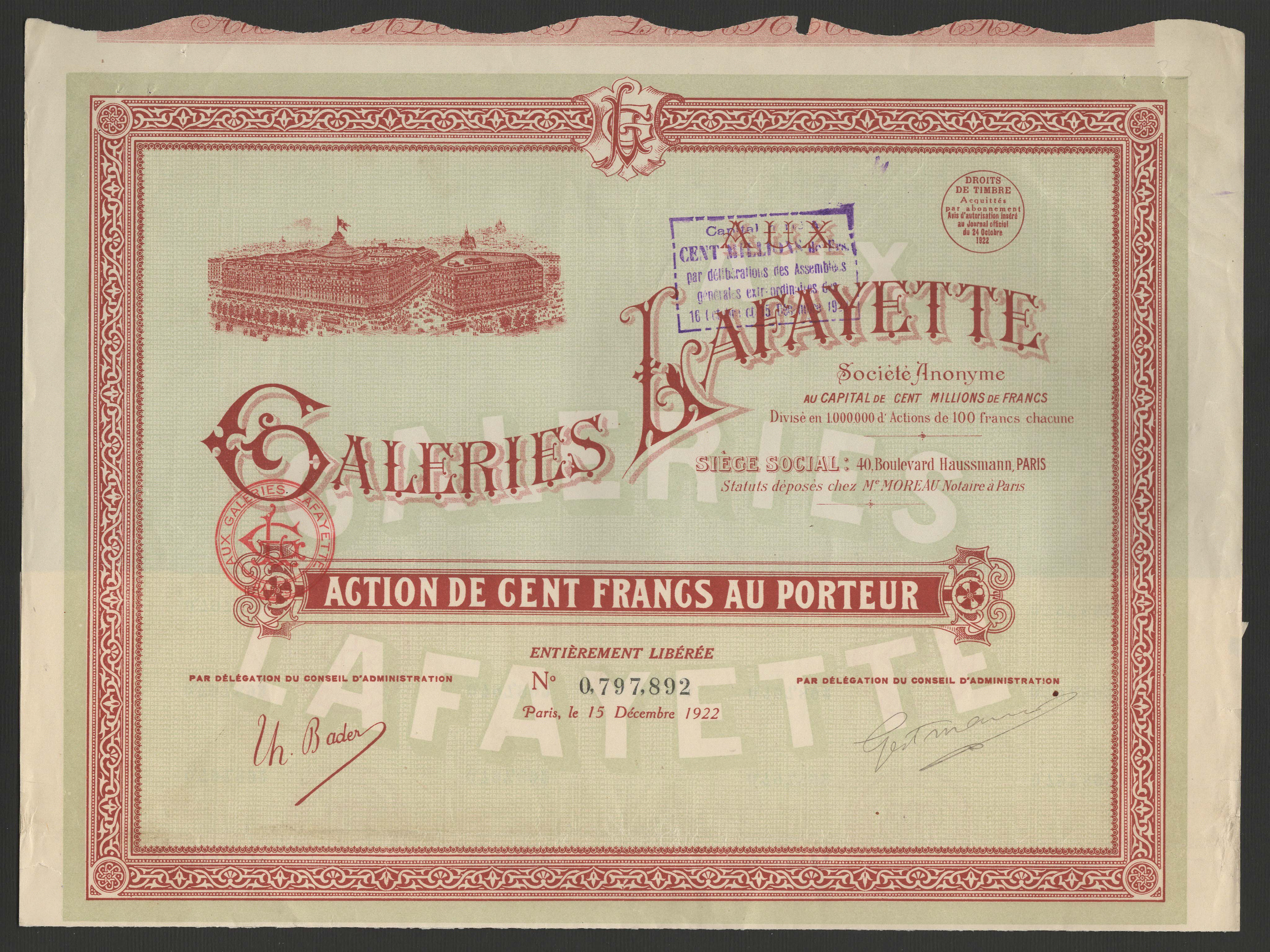
Share of the Galeries Lafayette S. A., issued 15 December 1922

In 1894, Théophile Bader and his cousin Alphonse Kahn opened a fashion store in a small haberdasher's shop at the corner of rue La Fayette and the Chaussée d'Antin, in Paris. In 1896, their company purchased the entire building at 1 rue La Fayette; in 1905 they acquired the buildings at 38, 40 and 42 boulevard Haussmann and 15 rue de la Chaussée d'Antin. Bader commissioned the architect Georges Chedanne and his pupil Ferdinand Chanut to design the store at the Haussmann location, where a glass and steel dome and Art Nouveau staircases were finished in 1912.

From 1921 Maurice Dufrêne directed the Maîtrise workshop of the Galeries Lafayette. This workshop for decorative art and furniture followed the Primavera of the Printemps store founded in 1912 by René Guilleré, Paul Follot's Pomone of Le Bon Marché, and the Studium of the Grands Magasins du Louvre.

In 2018, twenty-two stores in small and mid-sized French cities were turned into franchises and sold to FIB (Financière Immobilière Bordelaise) a company owned by Michel Ohayon. The decision to convert the stores to franchises was done as Galeries Lafayette wanted to focus on expansion internationally and online.

During 2021 eleven stores were franchised with seven sold to Société des Grands Magasins and the three sold to FIB who previously took over twenty two stores in 2018. The eleventh store in Avignon was given to Philippe Sempéré and Nicolas Chambon who also operate the Béziers store.

In 2025, Galeries Lafayette terminated its franchise agreement with Société des Grands Magasins due to the introduction of the online fast-fashion retailier Shein into Galeries Lafayette stores operated by SGM. The stores in Angers, Dijon, Grenoble, Le Mans, Limoges, Orléans and Reims were rebranded to BHV in November 2025, SGM purchased BHV from Groupe Galeries Lafayette in 2023.

As of 2025, Galeries Lafayette has opened over 50 stores (including subsidiarised stores) in France alone along with twelve outlet stores.

== Paris Haussmann ==
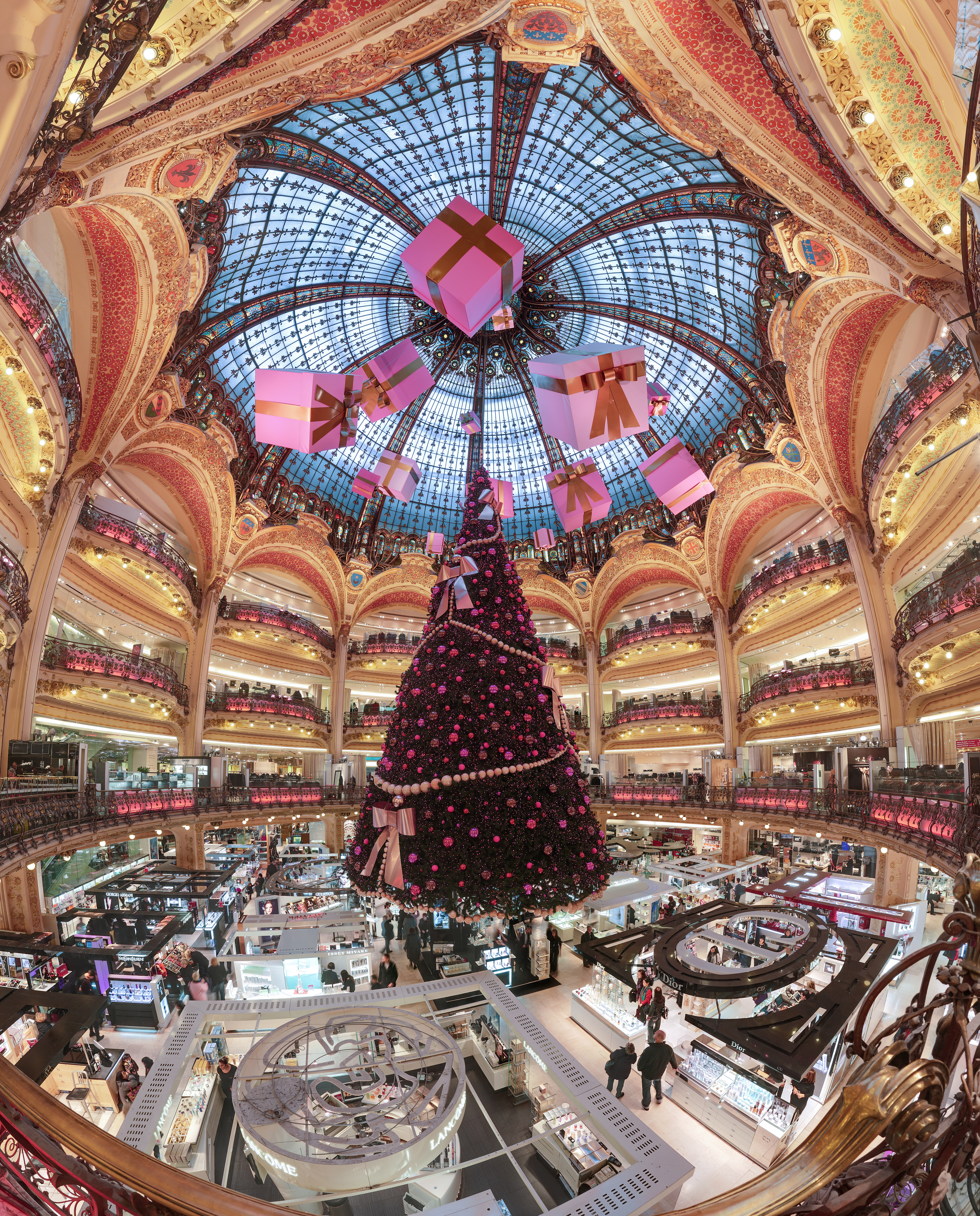
Inside view of Galeries Lafayette Haussmann with Christmas decorations in December 2009.

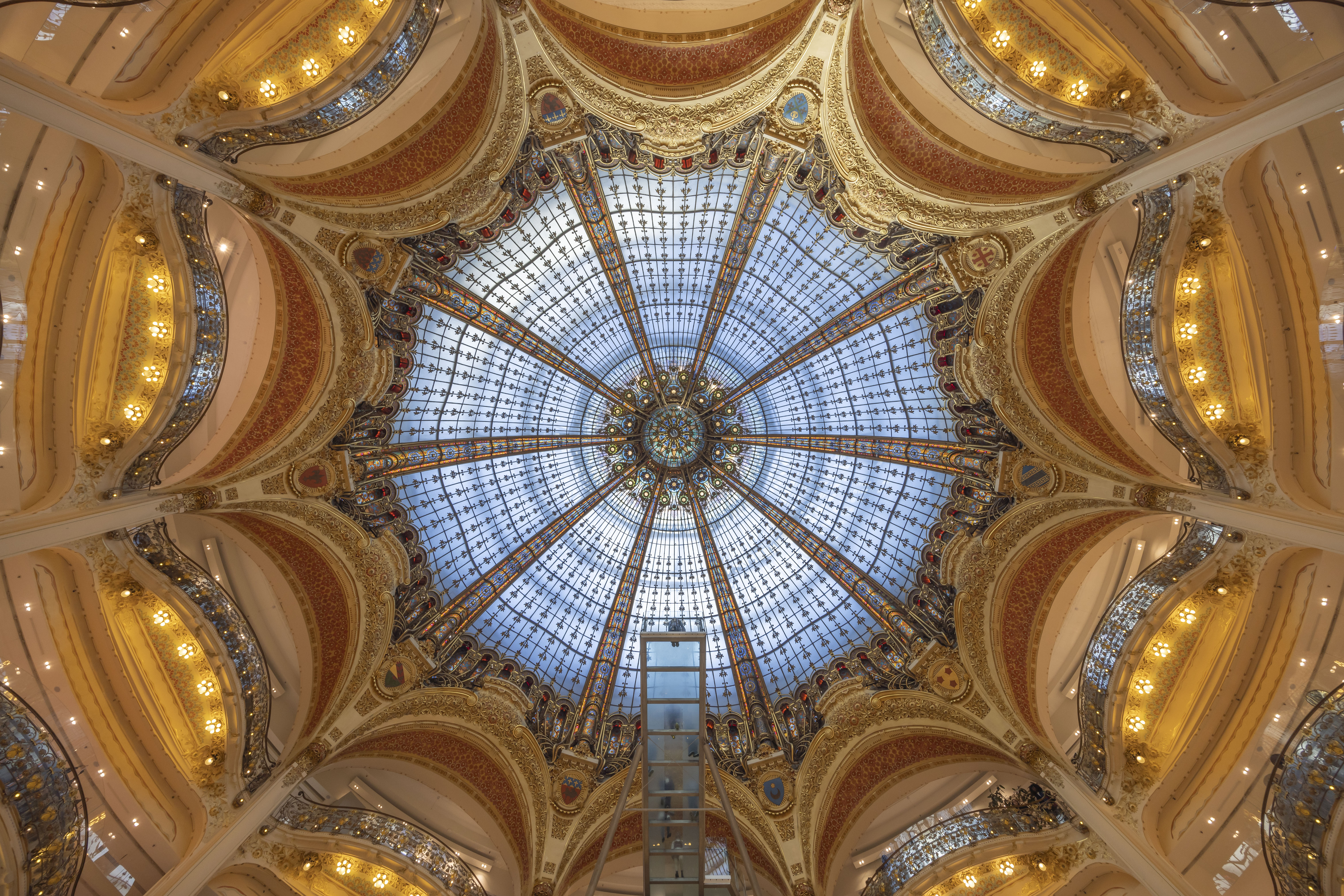
The cupola seen from below.

The Galeries Lafayette Haussmann is the flagship store and is located on Boulevard Haussmann in the 9th arrondissement of Paris, near Opera Garnier, at the corner of Rue La Fayette, close to Chaussée d'Antin – La Fayette Paris Métro station. It is a 70,000 m^{2} (750,000 sq ft) fashion flagship store. A wide range of brands are available at the store to suit all budgets, from ready to wear to haute couture. The architecture of the store is art nouveau, with a remarkable dome and a panoramic view of Paris that has made it a tourist attraction of the French capital city. Galeries Lafayette in Paris hosts a popular weekly fashion show for visitors.

=== History ===
In 1893, Théophile Bader and Alphonse Kahn opened a 70-square-metre (750 sq ft) store in Paris, on the corner of rue La Fayette and rue de la Chaussée d’Antin, selling novelty gifts. In 1896, the company purchased the entire building at number 1, rue La Fayette followed in 1903 by numbers 38, 40, and 42 on Boulevard Haussmann, as well as number 15, rue de la Chaussée d’Antin.

==== Aryanization during Nazi occupation ====
During Nazi occupation of France in 1940, Les Galeries Lafayette underwent a process of "Aryanization", that is the removal of Jewish owners and their replacement by non-Jewish owners. Théophile Bader, Raoul Meyer, Max Heilbronn, the store's administrators and 129 Jewish employees were forced to resign. The property of Bader, Meyer and Heilbronn families was taken.

The Galeries Lafayette group was transferred to non-Jewish owners: the Swiss Aubert and the French industrialist Harlachol.

==== Architecture ====
Théophile Bader appointed the architect Georges Chedanne to head up the first major renovations which were completed in 1907. Ferdinand Chanut, Georges Chedanne's apprentice, designed the store's 43-metre (141 ft) high Neo Byzantine dome. This store's inauguration ceremony took place in October 1912.

In 1932, the store was renovated with an Art Déco style by architect Pierre Patou.

==== Fashion and events ====
Théophile Bader acquired production facilities in order to make clothing exclusively for Galeries Lafayette under its own private label. He also manufactured affordable versions of designer wear.

This store then expanded to include menswear, furniture, toys and tableware departments and get involved in organizing events such as the rooftop landing by French pilot Jules Védrines in 1919.

In 1922, it opened arts workshops under the artistic direction of Maurice Dufrêne in order to produce affordable furniture, fabric, carpets, wallpaper, pottery, and other household goods.

Following the Second World War, the store underwent a complete makeover.

During the 1950s it hosted large international exhibitions, such as "The Best of Italian Manufacturing" in 1953.

In the 1960s, young designers began launching their ready-to-wear lines at the store. The first designer to become famous was Laura, in 1962. A little while later she went on to become known as Sonia Rykiel.

From 1980 to 1999 "Fashion Festivals", were organized, in order to select designs for the store. In 1984, the store opened a designer department including designs from, Jean-Paul Gaultier and Thierry Mugler.

From 2001 to 2015, Jean-Paul Goude collaborated with the brand on advertising campaigns in order to give the store a modern identity.

=== Offer ===
Galerie Lafayette Paris Haussmann is a 70,000 m^{2} (750,000 sq ft) store. Mostly dedicated to fashion, it also has other offers and services.

==== Food ====
Galeries Lafayette Paris Haussmann's food tasting bars offer French food together with produce from around the world.

==== Restaurants and bars ====
Cafés, bars and restaurants are located in the store for drinks and meals.

The rooftop has a bar, restaurant and terrace with a panoramic view of Paris and its monuments including the Eiffel Tower, the Montparnasse Tower, Invalides, and Opera Garnier.

Cultural space

Galeries Lafayette Paris Haussmann's cultural space "Galerie des Galeries" holds three to four exhibitions a year, showcasing both French and international design.

Events

Every Friday visitors can attend the store's free fashion show at 3 pm. These events can only be attended if reservations have been made in advance.

Galeries Lafayette Paris Haussmann has a suspended Christmas tree every year, the first of which was hung from the dome in 1976. The store also organizes a range of exhibitions and shows and during the festive period.

==== Services ====
English-speaking staff in the concierge area help with Wi-Fi access, tourist information, or restaurant and taxi reservations.

The tax refund service enables non-European residents to claim back their tax refund, based on the 12% tax they have paid on their purchases worth over €175.01 made on the day of purchase at Galeries Lafayette.

A personal shopper is also available and VIP services include the ordering of limousines or package deliveries to hotels.

== Other stores ==
=== Overseas stores ===
- Doha, Qatar – On 15 April 2019, Galeries Lafayette opened the store in partnership with the Ali Bin Ali Group. The store is located at 21 High Street and is over 14,500 m^{2} (156,000 sq ft).
- Dubai, UAE – Opened on 18 May 2009, the store is located at The Dubai Mall. In February 2011, the store unveiled Dubai's first gold ATM. Shoppers can insert cash and receive a corresponding amount of gold nuggets or coins.
- Jakarta, Indonesia – Opened in June 2013 the store is an anchor of the Pacific Place Mall where it occupies four floors. The store is operated in partnership with Mitra Adiperkasa.
- Luxembourg City, Luxembourg – Opened on 30 November 2019, in partnership with CODIC. The store is located within the Royal-Hamilius urban planning project built by Norman Foster.
- Mumbai, India – The store opened in early November 2025 and be located within two heritage buildings in the Fort precinct (Turner Morrison Building). The interior will be designed by Virgile & Partners. The store will be opened in a partnership with the Aditya Birla Group.
- Martinique, France – Two stores operate in Martinique (one in Downtown Fort-de-France and at la Galleria shopping mall in Le Lamentin).
- Shanghai, China – Opened on 25 October 2019, at the L+Mall in Lujiazui, Pudong. Originally in partnership with I.T.
- Shenzhen, China – Opened on 11 July 2023 (with a soft opening earlier in May 2023), the store is located in the Upperhills development and is 4,500 m^{2} (48,000 sq ft) and the store includes a Café Kitsuné. The store was opened in a partnership with the Hopson Group.

=== Planned overseas stores ===
- Delhi, India – The store will be located at the DLF Emporio, operated in partnership with the Aditya Birla Group.

=== Closed stores ===
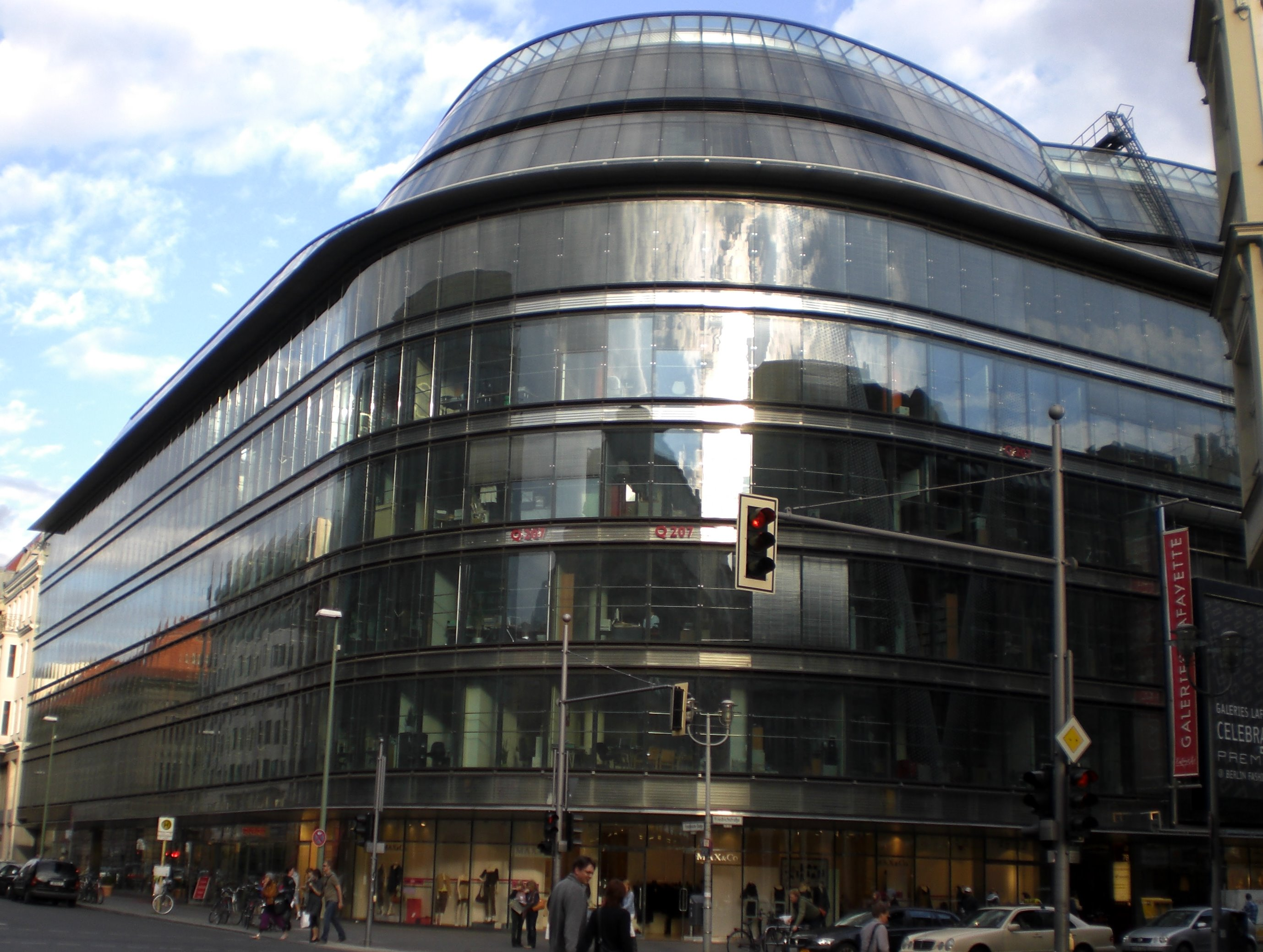
The now closed Berlin store designed by Jean Nouvel

- Beijing, China – Opened in 1997 on Wangfujing Street and closed after a year in operation.
- Beijing, China – Opened in September 2013 (official opening was in October 2013) with the store covering a total area of 28,000 m^{2} (300,000 sq ft) across six floors. The store was closed in May 2026.
- Berlin, Germany – Opened in February 1996, the store was designed by Jean Nouvel with construction taking place between 1991 and 1995. The store was located on Friedrichstraße two blocks south of the Under den Linden U-Bahn station. The store was closed in July 2024.
- Casablanca, Morocco – Operated from the 1920s through to the early 1970s. In 2011, a store opened at the Morocco Mall but it later closed in 2016. The store was designed by Davide Padoa of Design International.
- Chongqing, China – Opened on 28 September 2023. The store was located at InCity Chongqing within the Chongqing International Land-Sea Center. Closed in March 2025.
- Istanbul, Turkey – Opened in May 2017, in partnership with the DEMSA Group at Emaar Square Mall the store was closed in late 2021.
- London, United Kingdom – A branch opened on Regent Street in 1921, closing in 1972. The site is now occupied by Hamleys.
- Macau – Opened on 26 January 2024. The store was located at YOHO Treasure Island Resorts World and is operated in a partnership with Forward Fashion (International) Holdings Co. Ltd. The store was closed in early February 2026.
- Moscow, Russia – Opened in 1995 at GUM, the store only sold handbags and later closed.
- New York City, United States – Opened in September 1991 in a building adjacent and connected to Trump Tower the space was previously filled by Bonwit Teller from 1981 to 1989. However the store was unsuccessful and closed after three years in 1994.
- Singapore – Opened in 1982 at Goldhill Square, in 1986 the store closed and in 1987 relocated to Liat Towers. That store then closed in 1996.

=== Cancelled stores ===
- Beirut, Lebanon – Originally planned to open in the late 1990s/early 2000s but plans were put on hold and the franchise holder instead opened in Dubai.
- Guiyang, China – In 2020 it was announced that a store would open at D Place but the store was cancelled in favour to open a store in Chongqing.
- Istanbul, Turkey – Planned to open in 2019 at the Vadistanbul Shopping Centre it would have been the second store in Turkey and over 6,000 square metres.
- Kuwait City, Kuwait – Planned to open in 2019 at the Assima Mall in partnership with Ali Bin Ali the store would have been 7,500 m^{2} (81,000 sq ft).
- Milan, Italy – In June 2014, it was announced that a Galeries Lafayette store would open in Italy located at Westfield Milano a proposed shopping mall, the store is planned to be 18,000 m^{2} (190,000 sq ft). The Westfield Milano project is currently on hold and Galeries Lafayette no longer lists it as a planned opening.
- Moscow, Russia – There were plans to open a store in 2013. However, they never eventuated.
- Tehran, Iran – Planned to open in 2018 at the Iran Mall, it would have been three floors.
- Riyadh, Saudi Arabia – In 2025, Groupe Galeries Lafayette announced a planned a Riyadh store. In 2026, it was announced that due to the Middle Eastern crisis, Middle Eastern expansion plans have been put on hold.

== Galeries Lafayette Group ==
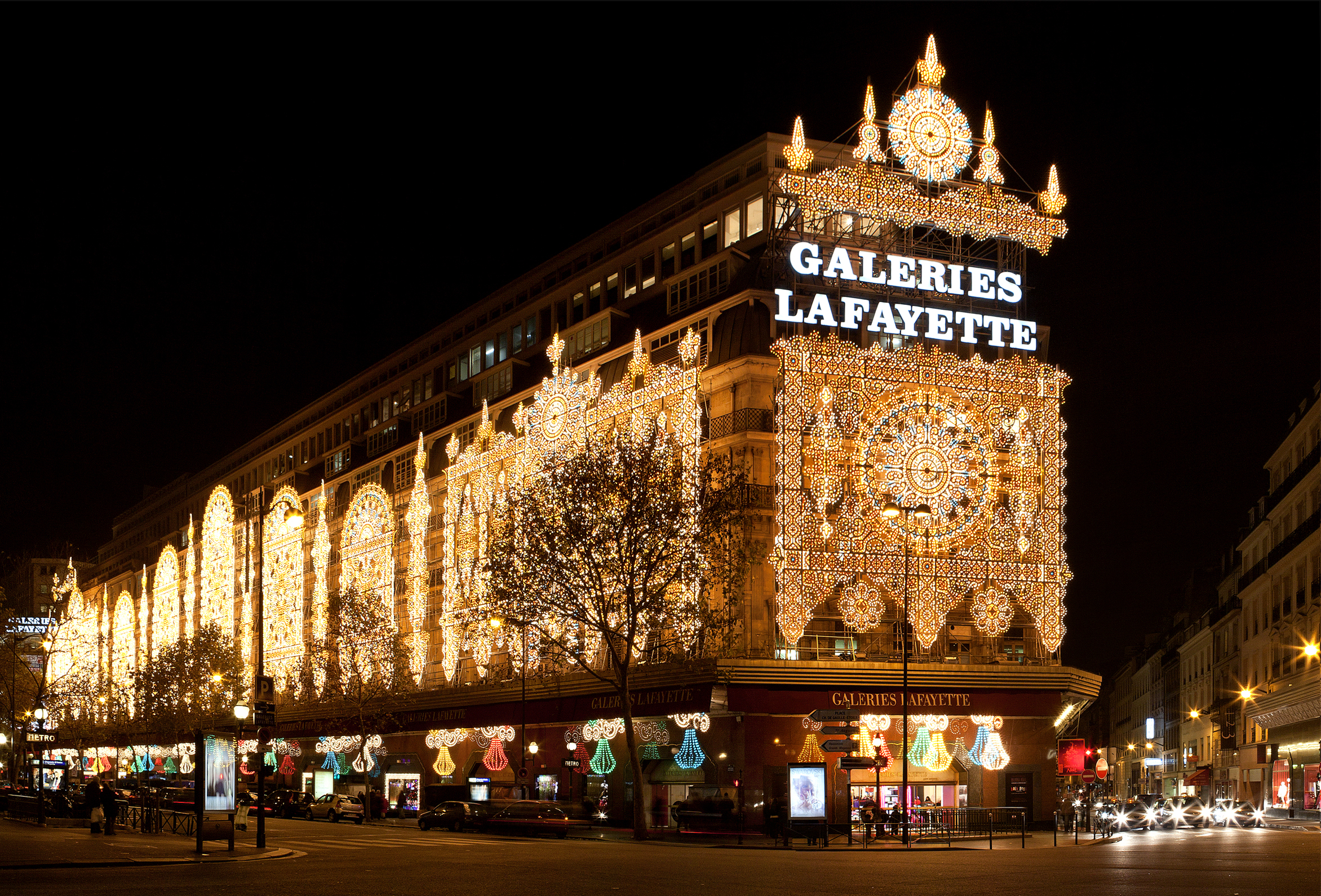
The Galeries Lafayette on Boulevard Haussmann in Paris, Christmas 2010

The Galeries Lafayette Group has its head office in Paris.

The Group owns the following subsidiaries:

- Galeries Lafayette
- La Redoute
- Mauboussin
- Nouvelles Galeries
- Galeries Lafayette - Royal Quartz Paris
- Louis Pion

They also used to own BHV until they sold the company to Groupe SGM in 2023. The group previously owned the Eataly Marais store (from 2019 to 2024) and BazarChic which will close in early 2025.

== See also ==
- Arcaffe
