= Ullmann =

Ullmann is a German surname also associated with Ashkenazi Jews. It means "man from Ulm".

Notable people with the surname include:

- Agnes Ullmann (1927–2019), Hungarian-French microbiologist, worked at National Centre for Scientific Research and the Pasteur Institute
- Alexander de Erény Ullmann (1850–1897), Hungarian deputy and political economist
- Andrew Ullmann (born 1963), German physician and politician
- Christoph Ullmann (born 1983), German ice hockey player
- Emerich Ullmann (1861–1937), Austrian surgeon
- Ewald Ullmann (born 1943), Austrian footballer
- Frances Ullmann DeArmand (1904–1984), American editor
- Fritz Ullmann (1875–1939), German chemist
- Gebhard Ullmann (born 1957), German jazz musician and composer
- Harrison Ullmann (1936–2000), American journalist
- Jeffrey Ullman (born 1942), American computer scientist
- Karl Ullmann (1796–1865), German Protestant theologian
- Kostja Ullmann (born 1984), German actor
- Linn Ullmann (born 1966), Norwegian author and journalist
- Liv Ullmann (born 1938), Norwegian actress
- Lisa Ullmann (1907–1985), German-British dance teacher
- Martin Ullmann (born 1986), German footballer
- Mona Ullmann (born 1967), Norwegian Paralympic athlete (no, it)
- Myron E. Ullman (born 1946), American businessman
- Regina Ullmann (1896–1961), Swiss poet
- Shalom Ullmann (1755–1825), German-Hungarian Talmudist
- Stephen Ullmann (1914–1976), Hungarian linguist
- Viggo Ullmann (1848–1910), Norwegian educator and politician
- Viktor Ullmann (1898–1944), Czech-Austrian composer, conductor and pianist
- Vojtěch Ignác Ullmann (1822–1897), Czech architect
- Walter Ullmann (1910–1983), Austrian-British medieval scholar
- William Ludwig Ullmann (1908–1993), American suspected spy
- Wolfgang Ullmann (1929–2004), German journalist, theologian, and politician

== See also ==
- Ullmann condensation, named after Fritz Ullmann
- Ullmann's Encyclopedia of Industrial Chemistry, named after Fritz Ullmann
- Ullmann reaction, in chemistry, named after Fritz Ullmann
- Ullmann Spur
- Ullmann Point, named after Ullmann Spur
- Ullmannite, a mineral, named after Fritz Ullmann
- Ullman
- Ulmann
- Ulman
