= Ulmanis =

Family name

Origin
- Origin: German
- Meaning: "man from Ulm"

Other names
- Variant forms: Ullmann, Ulmann, Ullman, Ulman

Ulmanis (feminine: Ulmane) is a Latvian surname of German origin (from German surname Ullmann). Individuals with the surname include:

- Guntis Ulmanis (born 1939), President of Latvia 1993–1999
- Gunārs Ulmanis (1938–2010), Latvian footballer
- Kārlis Ulmanis (1877–1942), First Prime Minister of Latvia

== See also ==
- Ullmann
- Ulmann
- Ullman
- Ulman
