= History of the Jews in Alsace =

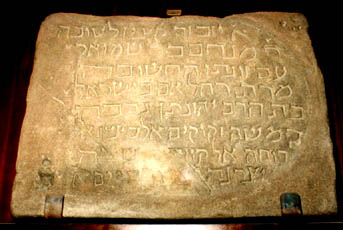
A stone plaque commemorating a donation to a synagogue in Strasbourg in the 12th century

The history of the Jews in Alsace is one of the oldest in Europe. It was first attested to in 1165 by Benjamin of Tudela, who wrote about a "large number of learned men" in "Astransbourg"; and it is assumed that it dates back to around the year 1000. Although Jewish life in Alsace was often disrupted by outbreaks of pogroms, at least during the Middle Ages, and reined in by harsh restrictions on business and movement, it has had a continuous existence ever since it was first recorded. At its peak, in 1870, the Jewish community of Alsace numbered 35,000 people.

== Language and origins ==
The language traditionally spoken by the Jews of Alsace was a dialect of Yiddish, Judeo-Alsatian (Yédisch-Daïtsch), originally a mixture of Middle High German, Old Alsatian, Medieval Hebrew and Aramaic, and largely indistinguishable from Western Yiddish. From the 12th century onwards, due among other things to the influence of the nearby Rashi school, French linguistic elements were incorporated as well; and from the 18th century onwards, due to immigration, some Polish elements were blended into Yédisch-Daïtsch too. Judeo-Alsatian went extinct around 1930 though documentation goes back to the 18th century.

== Medieval antisemitism and massacre of 1349 ==
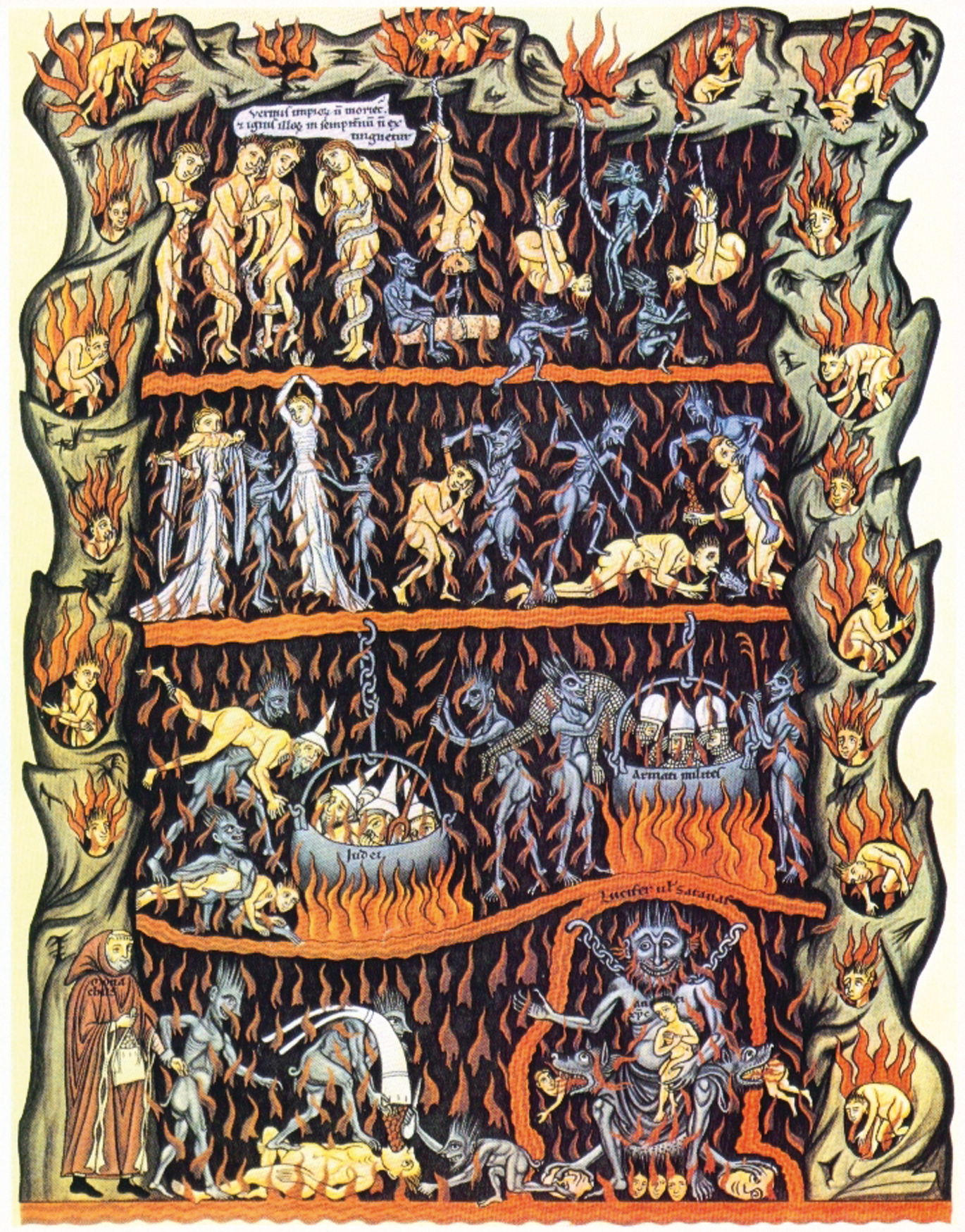
A kettle full of Jews (with white, pointed hats) burning in hell, an illustration from the 12th century Hortus deliciarum

Several disparaging representations of Jews in medieval Alsatian art, usually showing them with the characteristic three-pointed hat, have survived and can still be seen in situ, notably on the tympanum of the Romanesque Église Saints-Pierre-et-Paul in Sigolsheim, on the roof of the Église Saints-Pierre-et-Paul in Rosheim and the Église Saint-Léger in Guebwiller (both Romanesque as well, and showing a seated Jew holding a money purse), on Strasbourg Cathedral and on the gothic Collégiale Saint-Martin in Colmar, which shows two different representations of a Judensau. Other medieval representations have survived through copies of the Hortus deliciarum and as architectural fragments in the Musée de l’Œuvre Notre-Dame. Stained glass windows in the Niederhaslach Church, frescoes in the Église Saint-Michel of Weiterswiller and a tapestry in the Église Saints-Pierre-et-Paul of Neuwiller-lès-Saverne also show disparaging representations of Jews in traditional attire.

In 1286, Rabbi Meir of Rothenburg, one of the leading Jewish figures of his day, was imprisoned by the German king in a fortress near Ensisheim.

In 1349, Jews of Alsace were wrongfully accused of poisoning the wells with plague. On February 14, Saint Valentine's day, several hundred Jews were massacred during the Strasbourg pogrom. Jews were subsequently forbidden to settle in the town and were reminded every evening at 10 o'clock by a Cathedral bell and a municipal herald blowing the "Grüselhorn" to leave. Alsatian Jews then settled in the neighbouring villages and small towns, where many of them became cloth merchants ("Schmatteshendler") or cattle merchants ("Behemeshendler").

== Early modern times ==
An important political figure for the Jews of Alsace and beyond was the long-serving "shtadlan" Josel of Rosheim. In 1510 he was made the parnas u-manhig (sworn guide and leader) of the Jewish communities of Lower Alsace, before becoming the Holy Roman emperor's favourite interlocutor on Jewish matters and the most influential intercessor on the Jews' behalf.

== French rule until 1871 ==
With the annexation of Alsace to France in 1681, Catholicism was restored as the principal Christian current. However, the prohibition against Jews settling in Strasbourg, and the special taxes Jews were subjected to, were not lifted. In the 18th century, Herz Cerfbeer of Medelsheim, the influential merchant and philanthropist, became the first Jew to be allowed to settle in the Alsatian capital again. The French Revolution then admitted Jews back into the town.

By 1790, the Jewish population of Alsace was approximately 22,500, about 3% of the provincial population. Another 7500 Jews lived in neighboring Lorraine. Together they comprised three-fourths of the 40,000 Jews who lived in France at the time. The Jews were highly segregated, subject to long-standing anti-Jewish regulations. They maintained their own customs, language, and historic traditions within the tightly-knit ghettos; they adhered to Jewish law. Jews were barred from most cities and instead lived in hundreds of small hamlets and villages. They were also barred from most occupations, and concentrated in trade, services, and especially in moneylending. They financed about a third of the mortgages in Alsace. Leading philosophers of the French Enlightenment, such as Denis Diderot and Voltaire, ridiculed and condemned French Jews as misanthropic, rapacious, and culturally backward. In 1777, a local judge forged hundreds of receipts, which he gave to Catholic peasants, to "prove" they had repaid their debts to Jewish moneylenders. The Jews protested, and a Prussian official, Christian Wilhelm von Dohm, wrote a highly influential pamphlet "On the Civic Improvement of the Jews" (1781), which advanced the cause of Jewish emancipation in both Germany and France.

Religious tolerance grew during the French Revolution, with full emancipation given to Protestants in 1789, Sephardic Jews in 1790, and the Ashkenazi Jews of Alsace and Lorraine in 1791. When Napoleon created the "Grand Sanhedrin" in 1806, he appointed the Chief Rabbi of Strasbourg, Joseph David Sinzheim, as its first President. However, local antisemitism also increased, and Napoleon turned hostile in 1806, imposing a moratorium on repaying all debts owed to Jews. In 1808 Napoleon imposed tight limits on Jewish money-lending, capping interest rates at 5%. Napoleon's decrees collapsed after he fell from power, but an undercurrent of antisemitism remained.

In the 1830–1870 era, urban middle-class Jews made enormous progress toward integration and acculturation, as antisemitism sharply declined. By 1831, the state began paying salaries to official rabbis, and in 1846 a special oath required for Jews in court was discontinued. Antisemitic riots occasionally occurred, especially during the Revolution of 1848. In 1854, Isaac Strauss became director of the orchestra of the bals de l'Opéra and then of the bals des Tuileries, before the empress Eugénie de Montijo replaced him with Émile Waldteufel in 1867. During this era before 1870 many Jews converted to Christianity, including David Paul Drach (1823), Francis Libermann (1826) and Alphonse Ratisbonne (1842). After Alsace was incorporated into Germany in 1871 (until 1918) antisemitic violence diminished.

== Annexation of Alsace by Germany ==
On 10 May 1871, following the defeat of France in the Franco-Prussian War, Germany annexed Alsace and half of Lorraine. The French Jewish population of about 90,000 persons lost 40,000 people. Some 4,500 Alsatian Jews left in one year to live in France, and cultural attachment to France stayed strong.

== Dreyfus affair ==
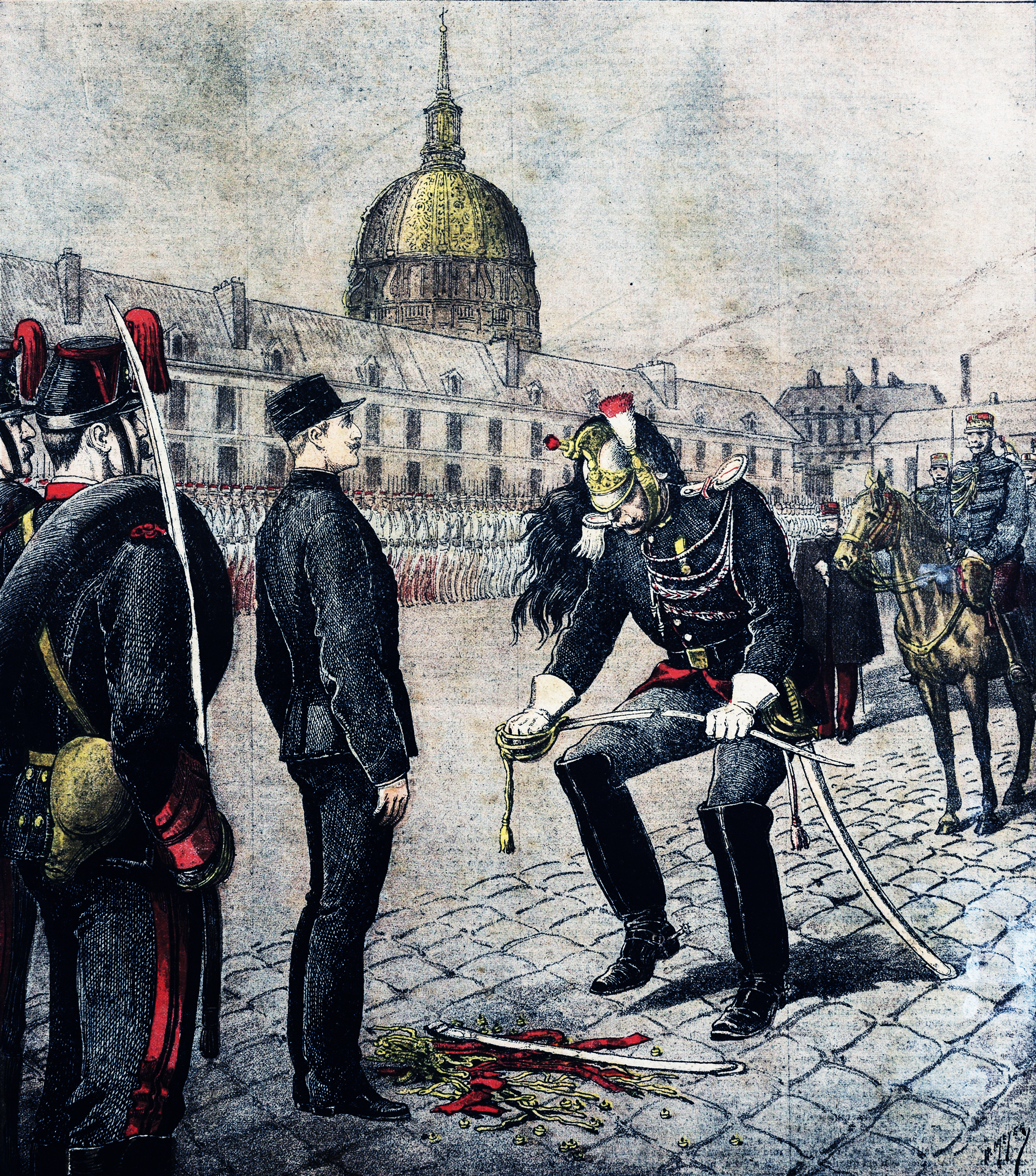
Degradation of Alfred Dreyfus, January 5, 1895

While the Dreyfus affair (1894–1906) by and large played out in France, and Alsace was a part of Germany at the time, it had immediate repercussions for the Jews in Alsace. Alfred Dreyfus was by birth a citizen of Mulhouse and thus suspected by French conservatives of innate sympathy with the German enemy by virtue of his being Alsatian and Jewish, which put him under suspicion of being doubly disloyal. One of the alleged traitor's strongest advocates was fellow Mulhousian Auguste Scheurer-Kestner, a (non-Jewish) chemist, industrialist, politician and philanthropist. Another main player in the Affair, and advocate of Dreyfus' cause, was the Strasbourg-born army general Georges Picquart.

== World War I ==
During World War I Alsace was a part of Germany and included 23,400 Jews, among which a big part (5,500) lived in the city of Strasbourg. Alsatian Jews had to enroll in the German army. About 4,000 Jews fought in the German imperial army, and more than 300 died. Most of them had to fight against their families living in France. Some Alsatian Jews who were working or in vacation in France at the start of the war decided to enlist in the French army and adopted fake names to avoid retaliation affecting their families back in Alsace.

== 1940–1945 ==
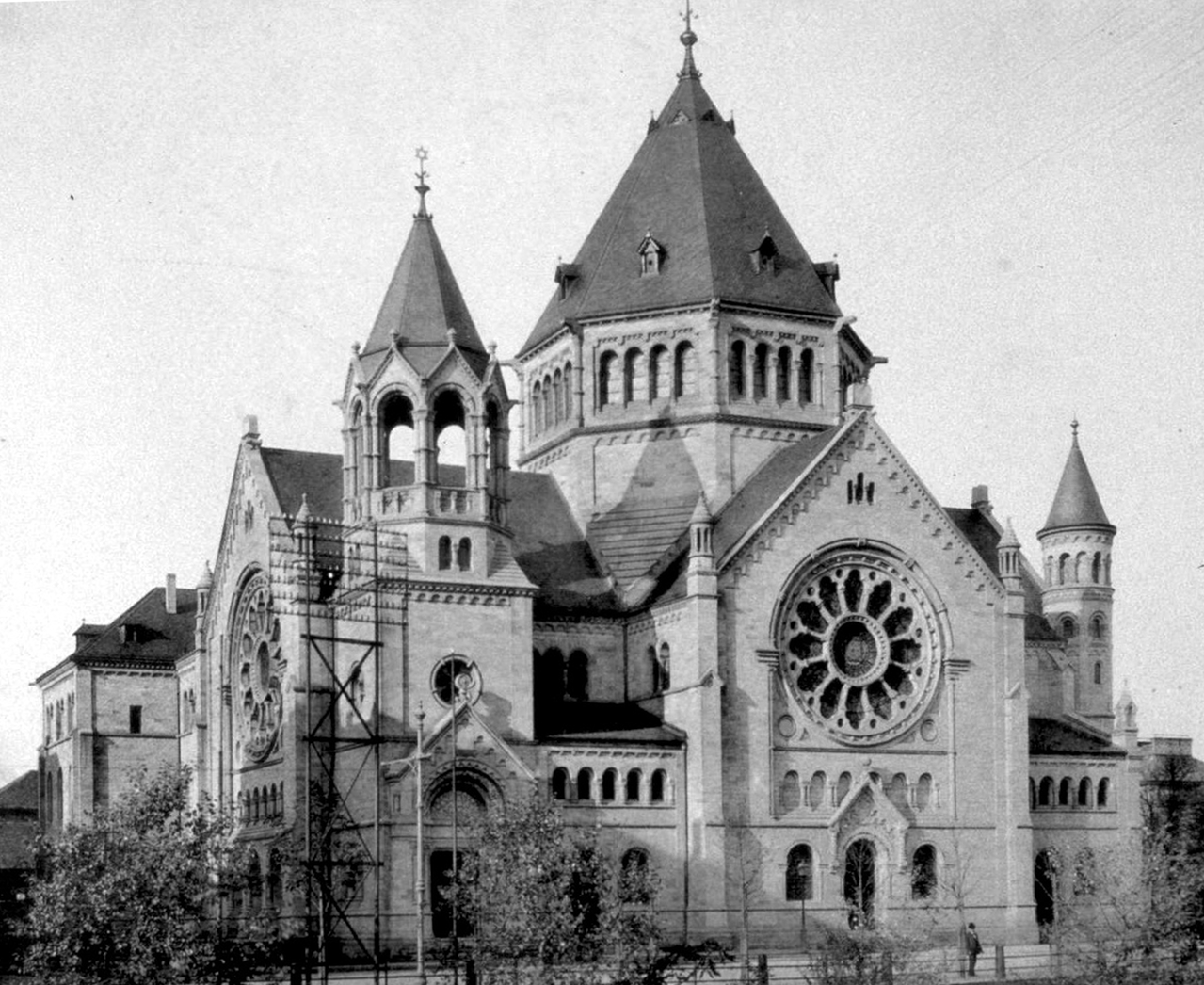
Synagogue du Quai Kléber, Strasbourg, inaugurated in 1898, burnt and razed by the Nazis in 1940–1941

In 1939, there were about 20,000 Jews living in Alsace and Lorraine. Immediately following the start of World War II on 3 September 1939, the French government started evacuating Jews from Alsace and Lorraine. About 14,000 Jews were evacuated to Périgueux and Limoges in southwest France, and far from the German border. About 5,000 more Jews fled to southern France after the German invasion and defeat of France in May 1940.

Under the terms of the Armistice of 22 June 1940, Alsace became part of the German occupation zone. On 15 July 1940, most of the remaining Alsatian Jews (about 3,000) were evicted from their homes by the German authorities and deported to Vichy France. The Germans declared Alsace and Lorraine to be Judenrein (lit: cleansed of Jews).

Unlike most of the German-occupied region of France, Alsace was effectively annexed by Germany by 1942, when Alsatians became German citizens by decree, and Alsace formally became part of the administrative unit (Gau) of Baden-Elsaß. During World War II, Germany established the Natzweiler-Struthof concentration camp in Alsace. August Hirt became an institute director at the Nazi University of Strasbourg; he is notorious for his experiments with concentration camp prisoners and for his efforts to establish a Jewish skull collection.

Many Alsatian Jews who had been relocated to western regions of the country were ultimately arrested and deported. It is estimated that 2,605 Jews from Bas-Rhin and 1,100 from Haut-Rhin were murdered during the Holocaust.

Businessmen such as Théophile Bader, founder of the Galeries Lafayette; Pierre Wertheimer, founder of the French cosmetics company Bourjois and partner of Coco Chanel; and Albert Kahn, banker and philanthropist would have faced confiscation of their properties and/or deportation to a death camp if they had not managed to flee in time.

== Jews in Alsace today ==
After the Algerian war, beginning in 1962 and as in the rest of France, Sephardic Jews arrived in Alsace from North Africa. In the year 2000, roughly 4,000 Jews in Strasbourg were Sephardic, making up a little over 25% of the total Jewish population. In the year 2001, roughly 25% of the 500 Jewish families of Mulhouse were Sephardic.

During modern times the distinct dialect and culture of the Alsatian Jews has been in decline. This is due to the priority of the community on assimilating into French culture and the lack of priority on preserving their own culture.

== Presentation of Alsatian Jewish history and heritage ==
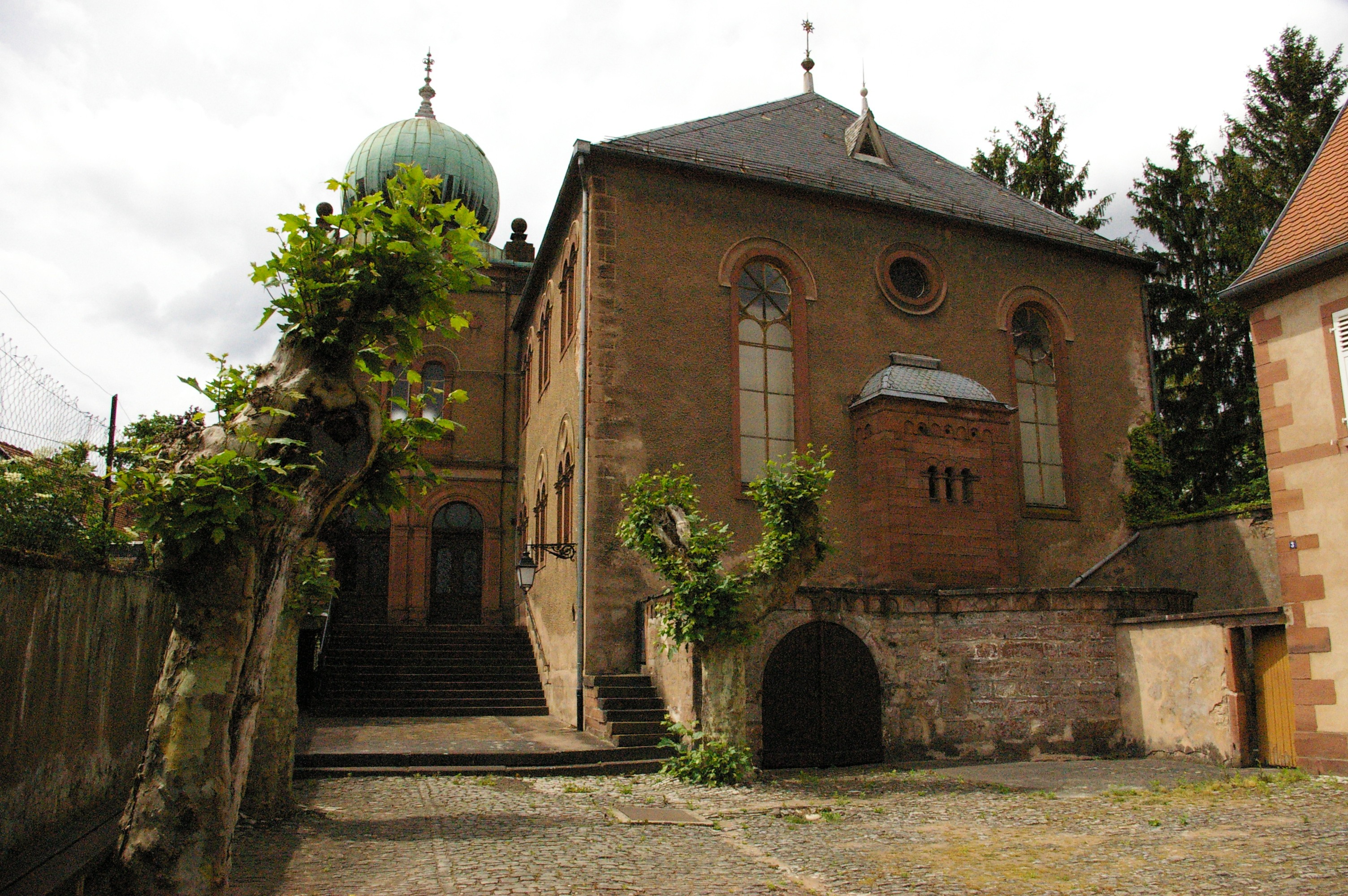
Ingwiller's now abandoned synagogue was built in 1822 over the ruins of a medieval castle, and enlarged in 1891.

A presentation of the Alsatian Jews' history and culture through collections of artifacts and architectural elements can be found in the Musée Judéo-Alsacien of Bouxwiller, Bas-Rhin, in the Musée du bain rituel juif (Mikvah museum) of Bischheim, in the Musée alsacien and the Musée historique of Strasbourg, in the Musée historique of Haguenau, in the Musée d'Arts et Traditions Populaires of Marmoutier, in the Musée du vieux Soultz of Soultz-Haut-Rhin, in the Musée du pays de la Zorn of Hochfelden, in the Musée de l'image populaire of Pfaffenhoffen and in the Musée Bartholdi of Colmar.

In 1984, the site of a medieval mikvah was found in a group of houses in Strasbourg and was later added to the government list of historical monuments.

The annual European Day of Jewish Culture was initiated in 1996 by the B'nai Brith of Bas-Rhin together with the local Agency for Development of Tourism. It now takes place in 27 European countries including Turkey and Ukraine. The original aim of the day was to permit access to, and ultimately encourage restoration of, long-abandoned synagogues of architectural value such as those in Wolfisheim, Westhoffen, Pfaffenhoffen, Struth, Diemeringen, Ingwiller and Mackenheim.

== Notable Jews born in Alsace ==
- Liliane Ackermann
- Théophile Bader
- Hans Bethe
- Gustave Bloch
- Moses Bloom
- Marcelle Cahn
- David Léon Cahun
- Isaachar Bär ben Judah Carmoly
- Herz Cerfbeer of Medelsheim
- Debré family
- Alfred Dreyfus
- Louis Dreyfus family
- Javal family
- Josel of Rosheim
- Albert Kahn (banker)
- Alphonse Kahn
- Zadoc Kahn
- Maurice Kriegel-Valrimont
- Friedrich Wilhelm Levi
- Alphonse Lévy (1843-1918, born in Marmoutier), painter
- Maurice Lévy
- Francis Libermann
- Isidore Loeb
- Marcel Marceau
- Sam Marx
- Charles Netter
- Marie-Alphonse Ratisbonne
- Camille Sée
- Isaac Strauss (1806–1888), conductor and arts collector
- Benjamin Ulmann
- Claude Vigée
- Pierre Villon
- Vivelin the Red
- Émile Waldteufel
- Alexandre Weill (1811–1899), writer
- Cora Wilburn
- Robert Wyler
- William Wyler

== Gallery ==
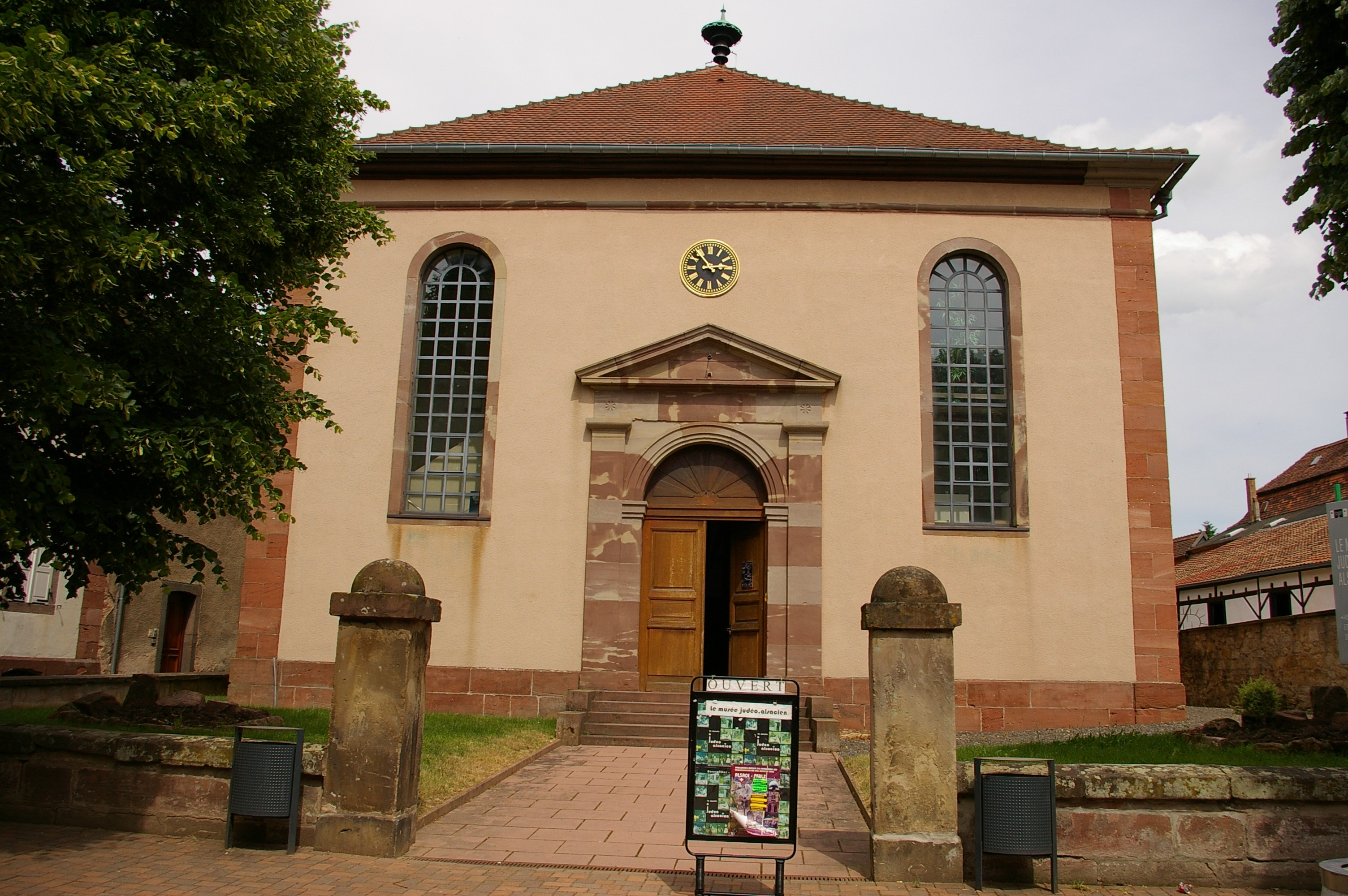
Museum of Alsatian Judaism in former Synagogue (1842), Bouxwiller, Bas-Rhin

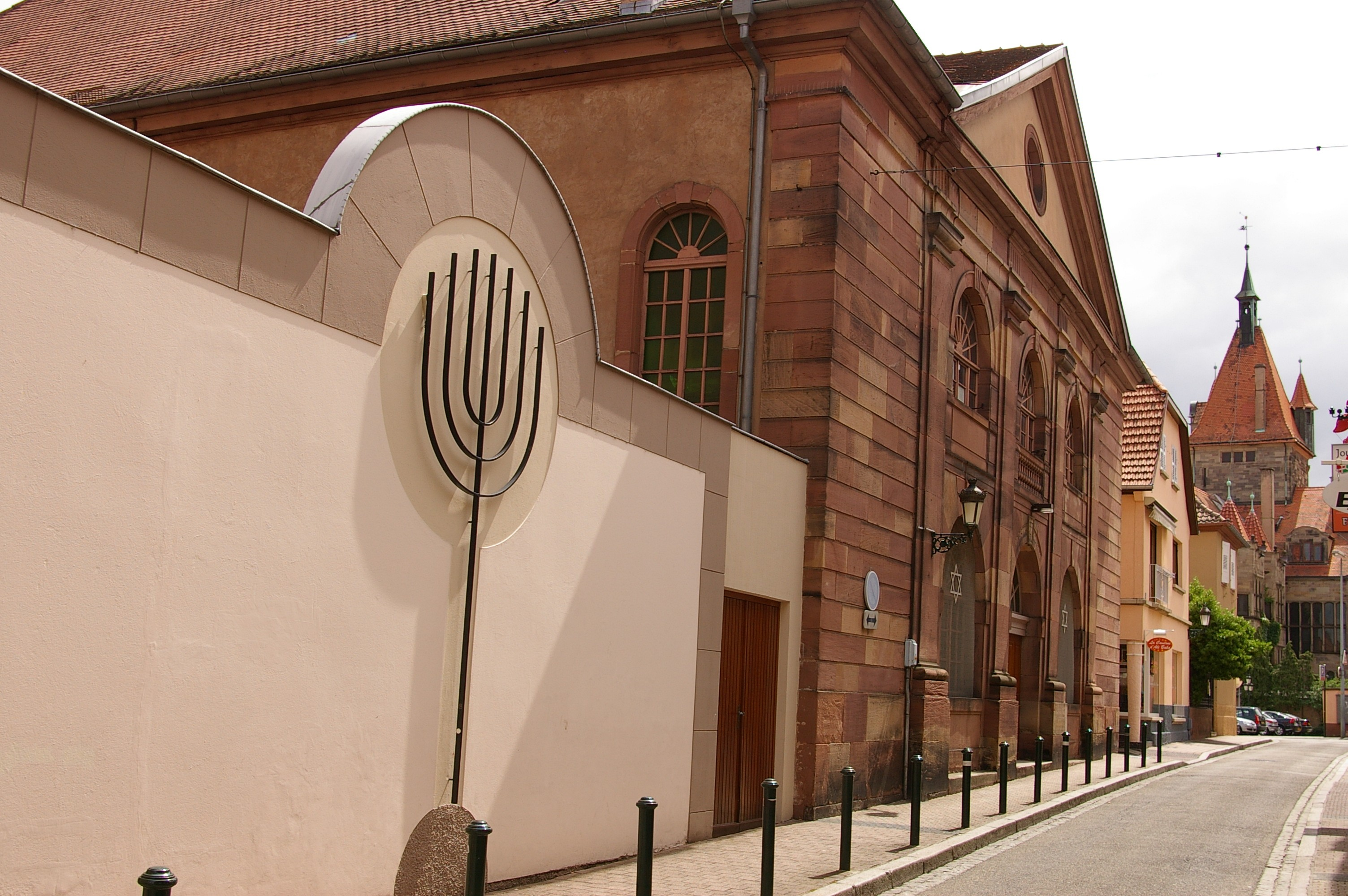
Synagogue of Haguenau (1820)

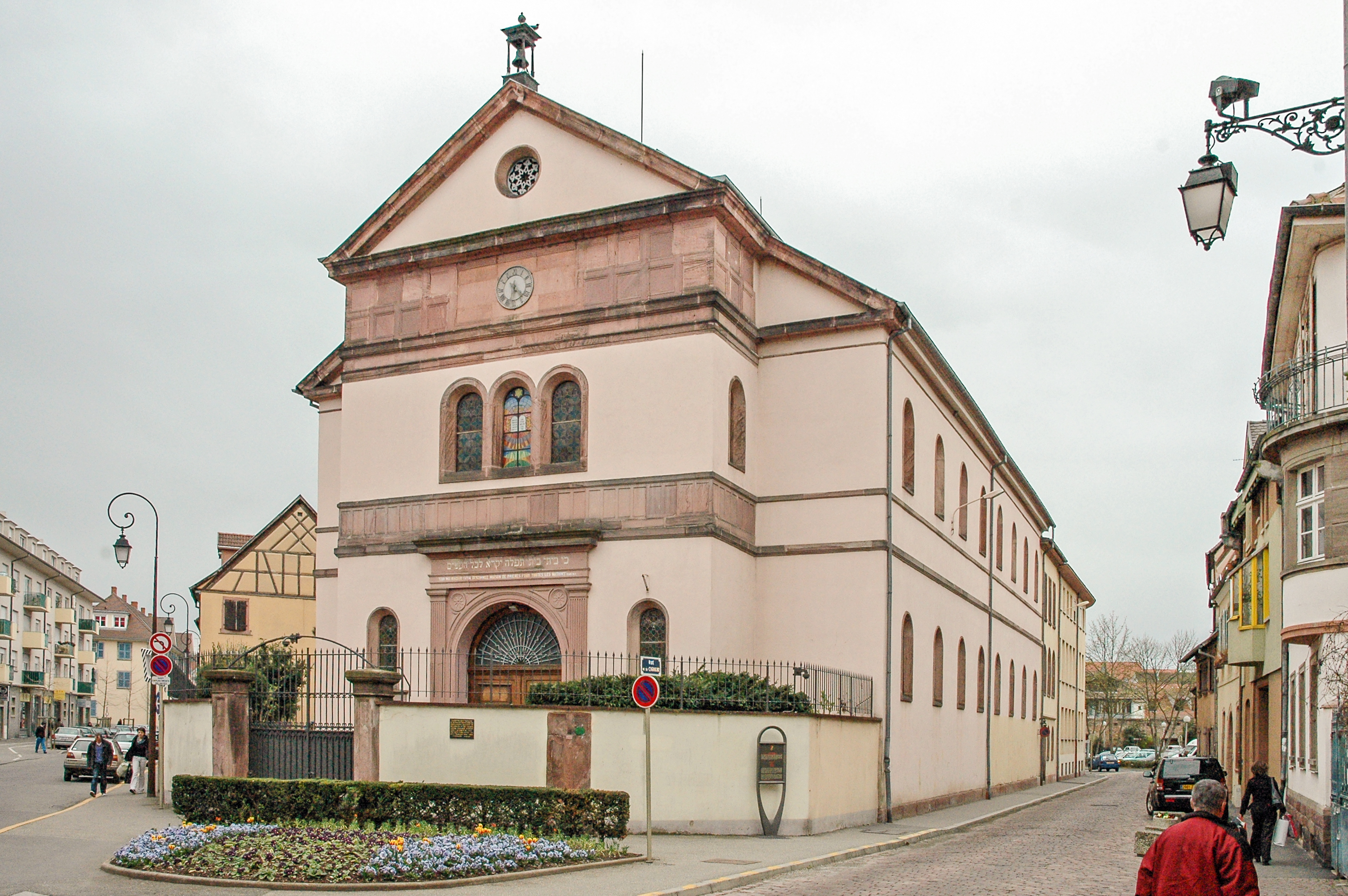
Synagogue of Colmar (1839)

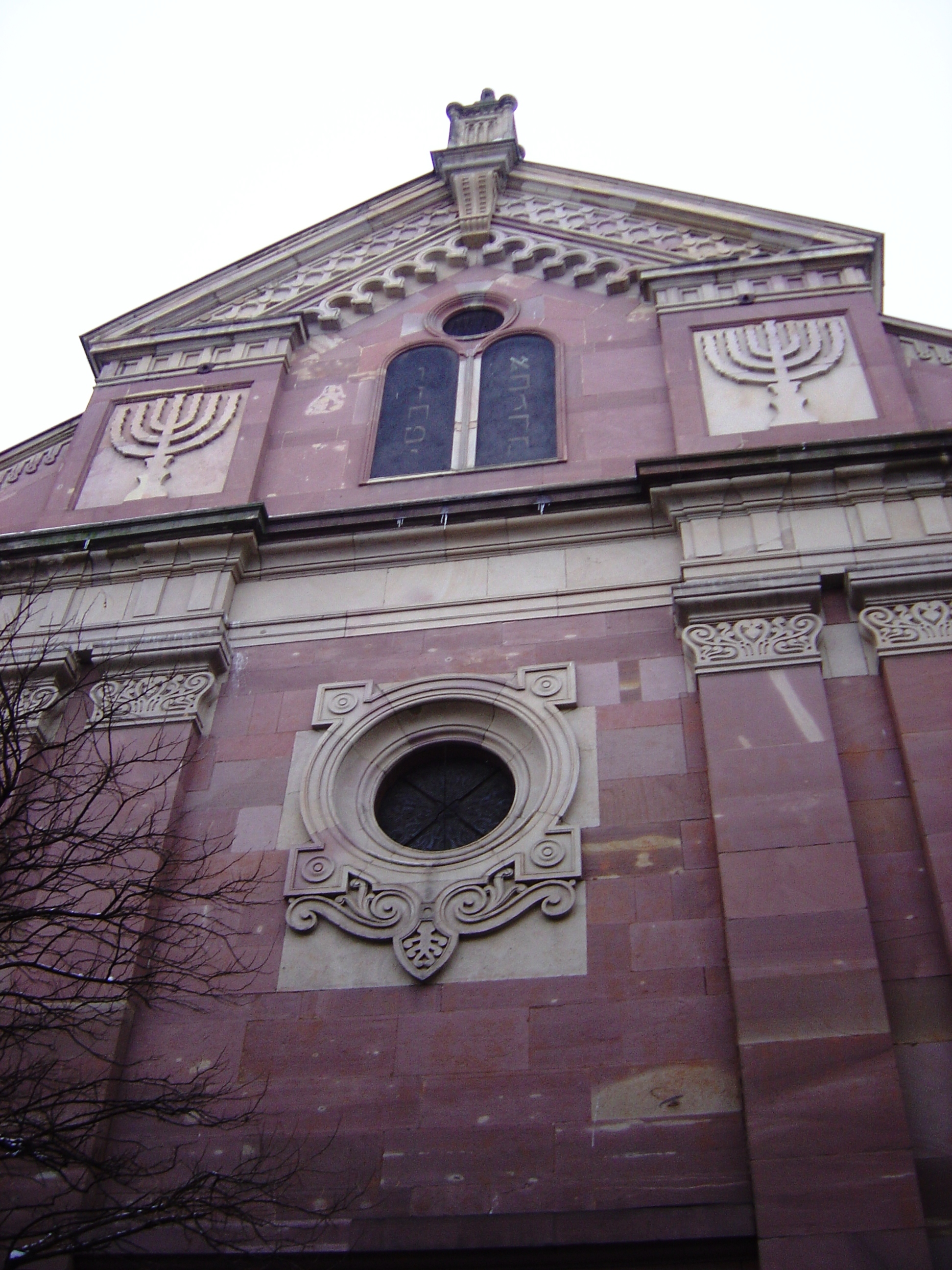
Synagogue of Mulhouse (1848)

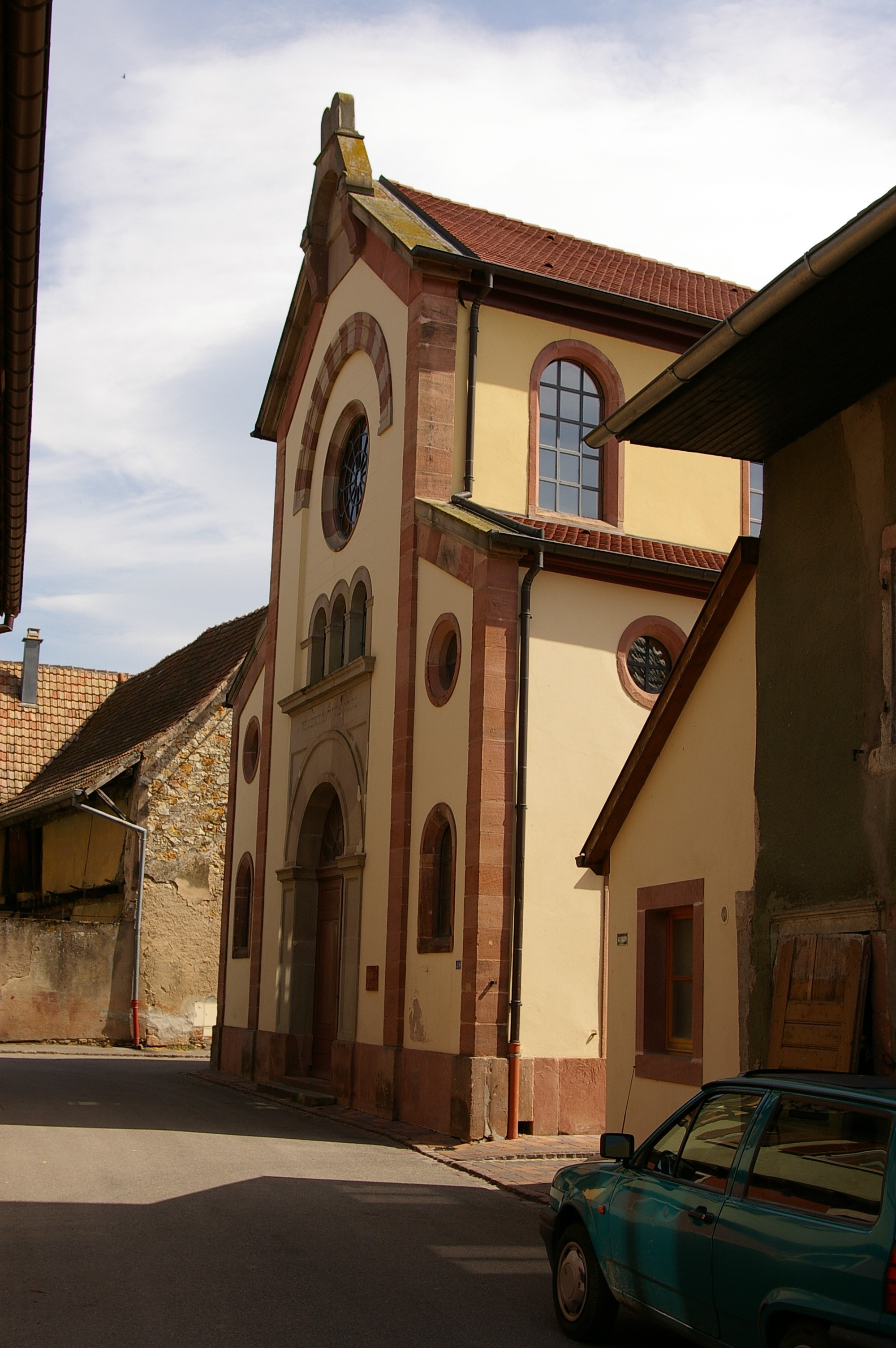
Synagogue of Bergheim, Haut-Rhin (1863)

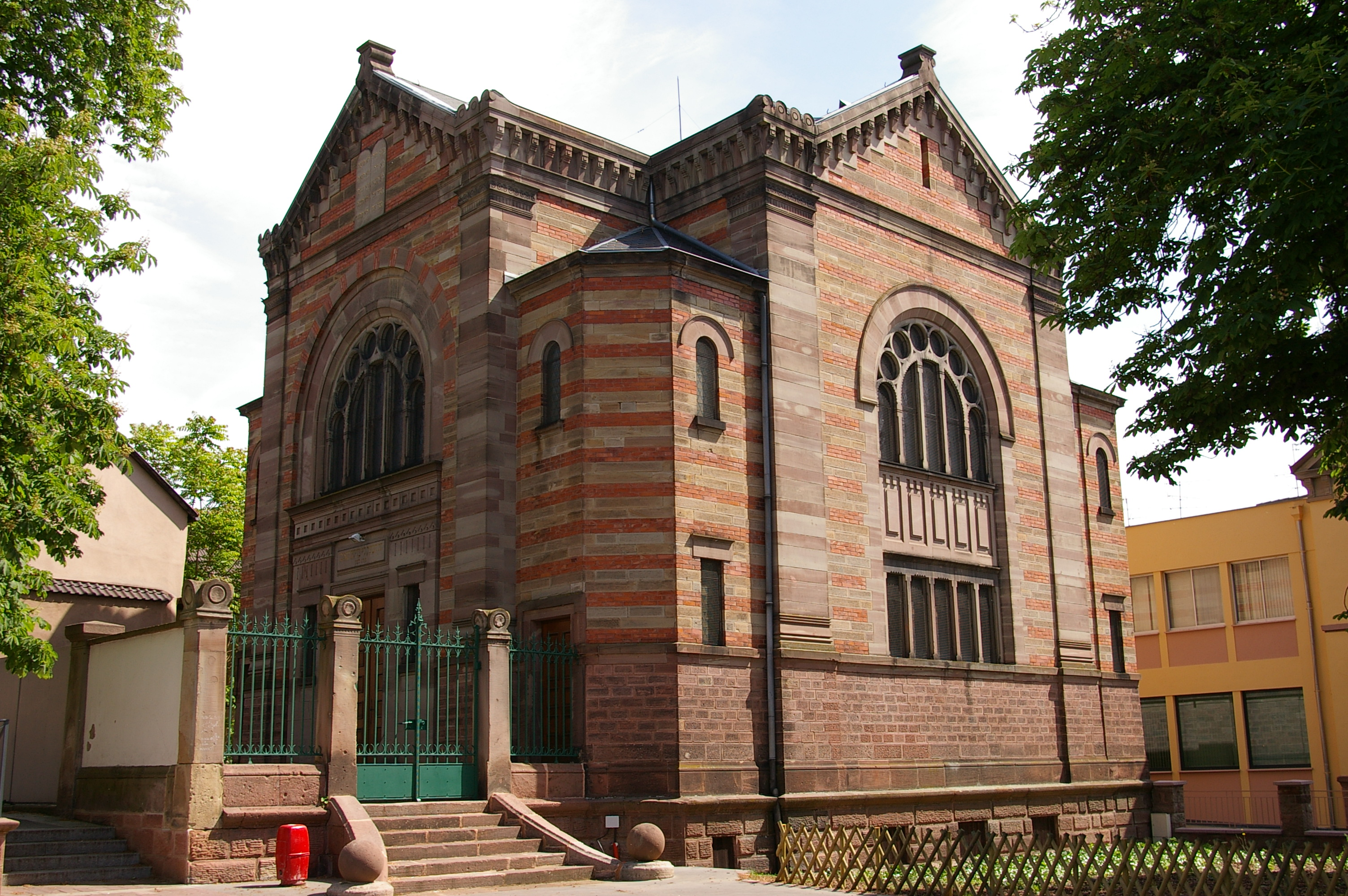
Synagogue of Sélestat (1890)

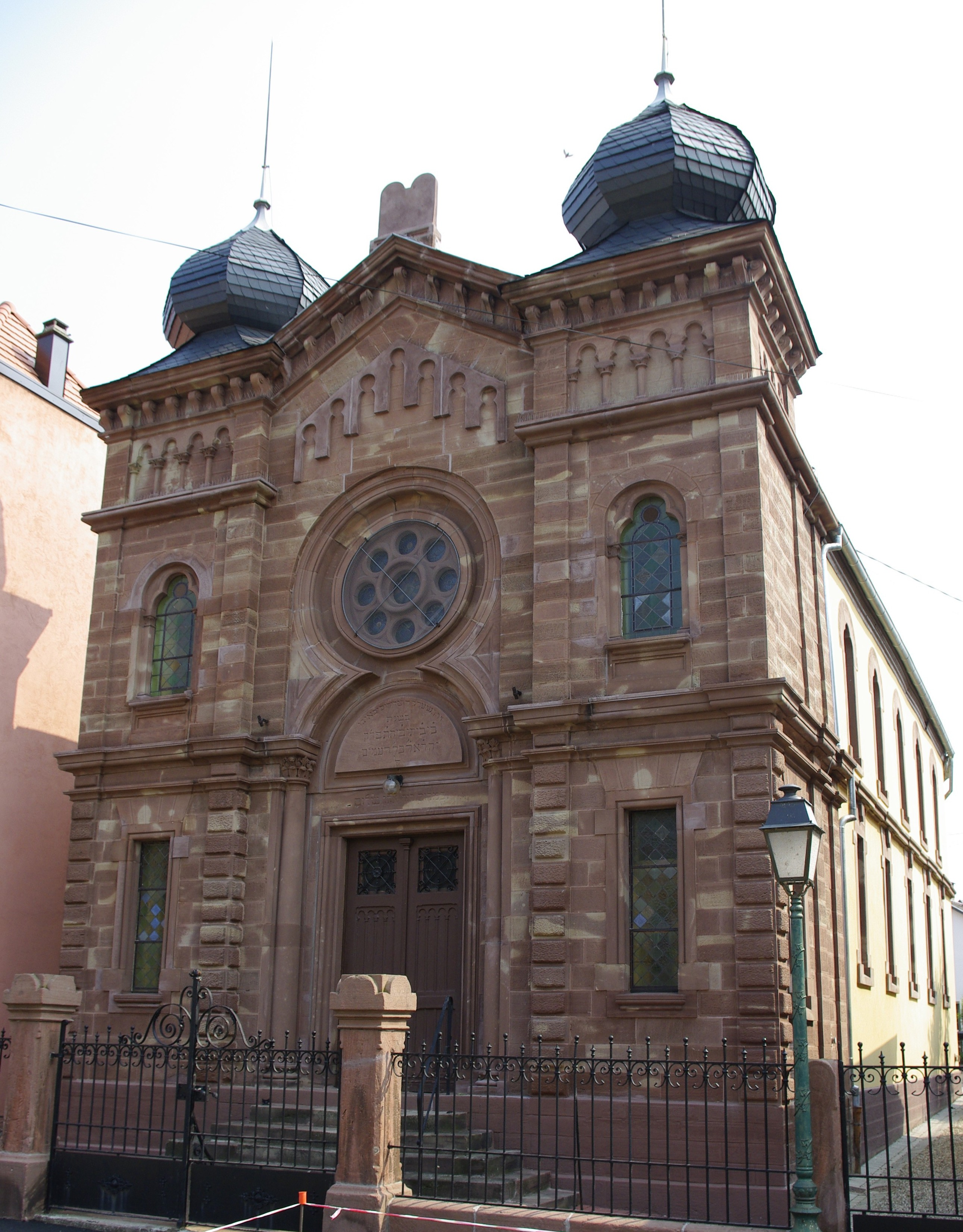
Synagogue of Wolfisheim (1897)

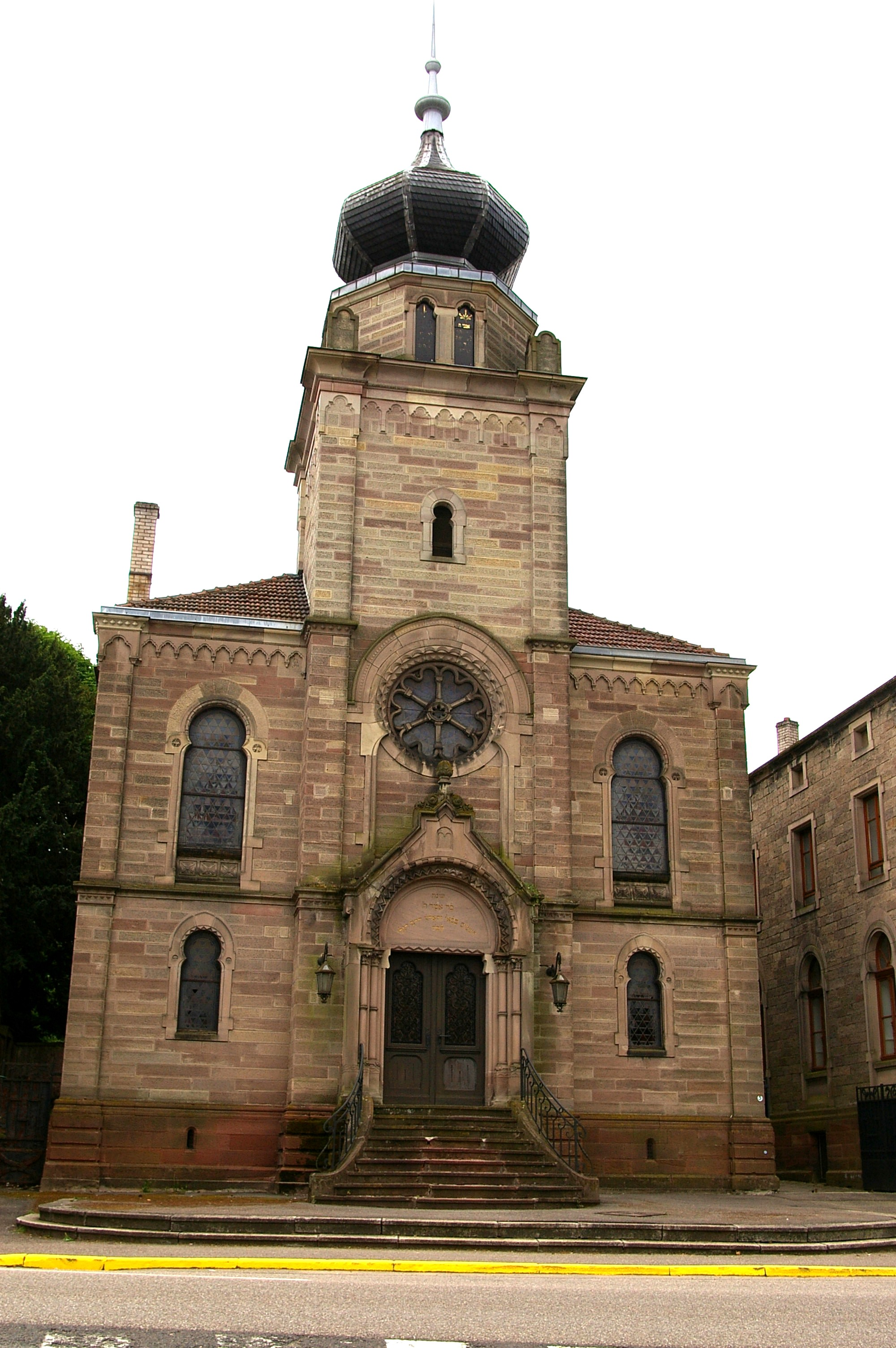
Synagogue of Saverne (1900)

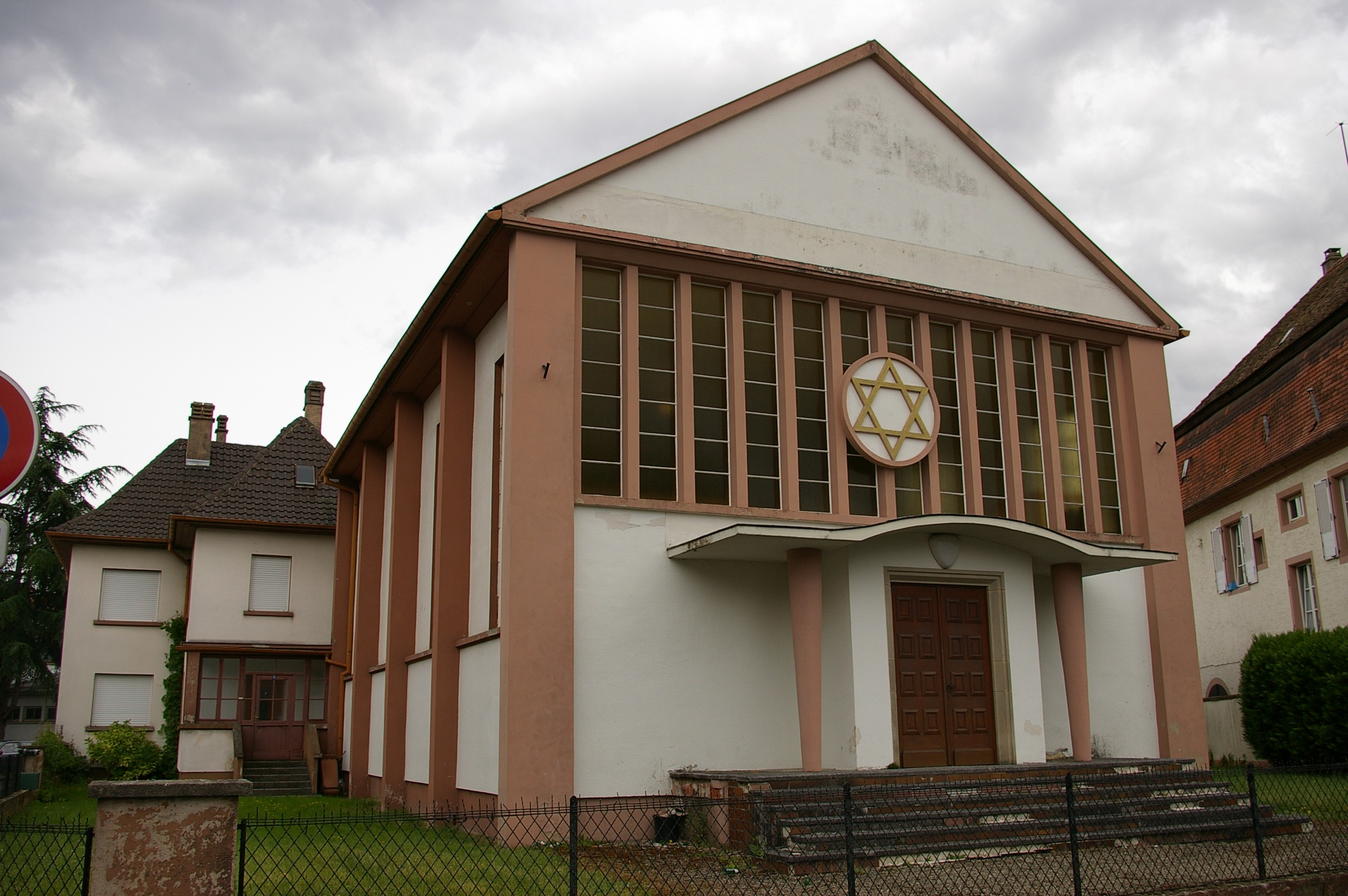
Synagogue of Wissembourg (1960)

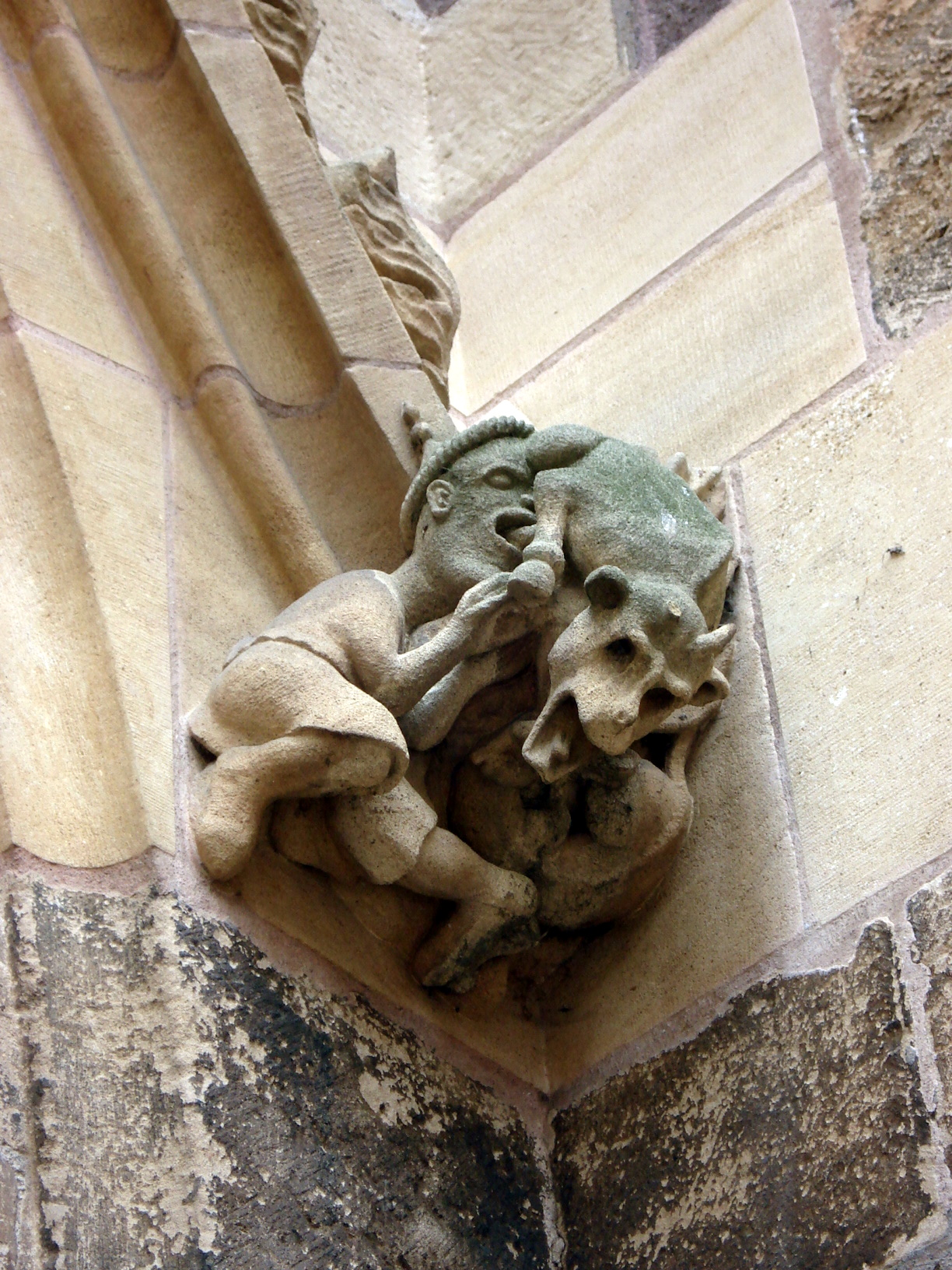
One of the two "Judensäue" in Colmar

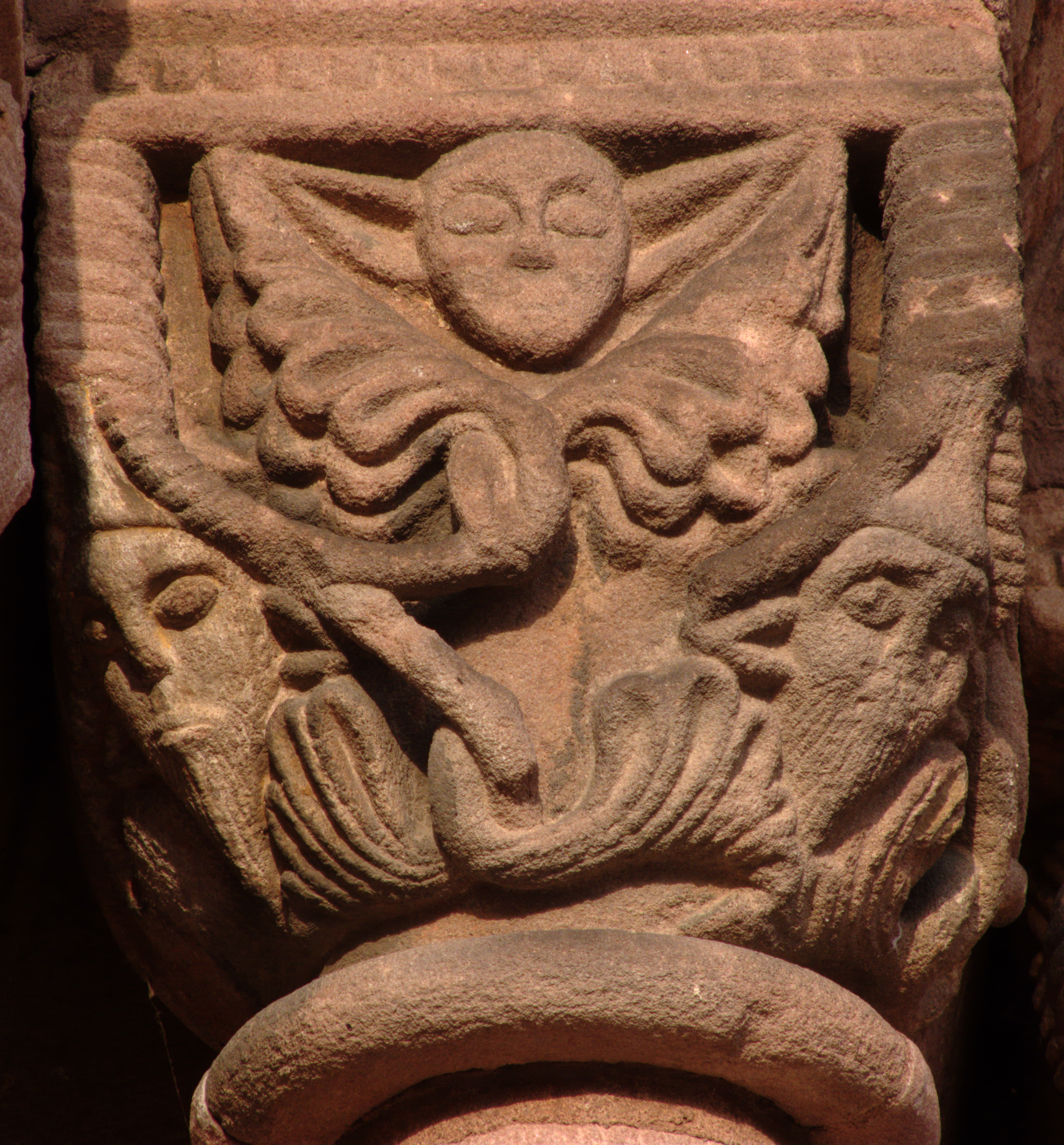
Romanesque capital in Sigolsheim showing Jews with characteristic hats on each lower corner

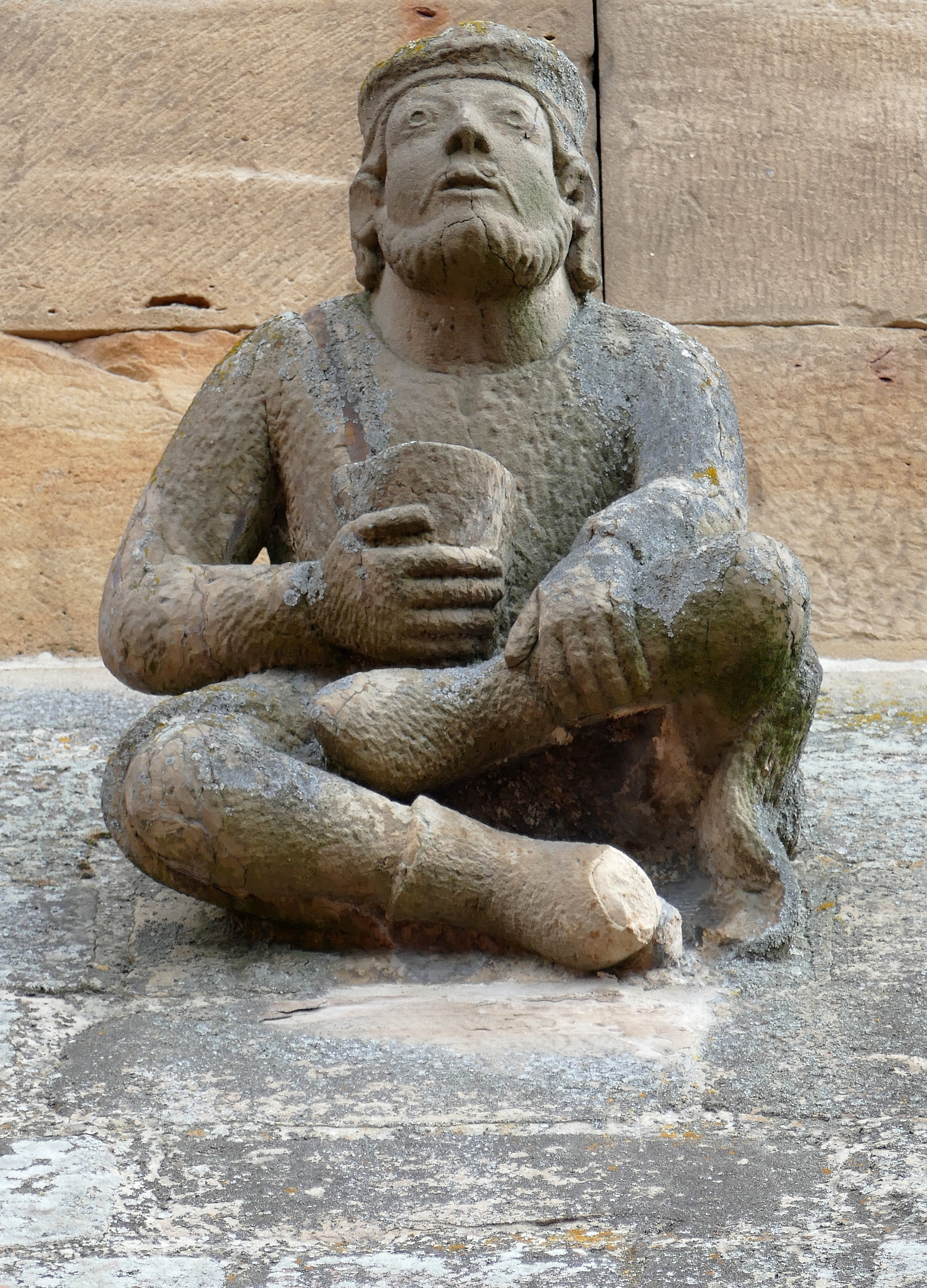
"The Jew with a money purse" in Rosheim

== See also ==
- Colmar Treasure
