= Ulmann =

Ulmann is a surname. Notable people with the surname include:

- Albert Ulmann (born 1861), American banker and author
- Benjamin Ulmann (1829–1884), Alsatian-French historical painter
- Doris Ulmann (1882–1934), American photographer
- Regine Ulmann (1847–1938), Austrian school director, editor and feminist
- Salomon Ulmann (1806–1865), Alsatian-French rabbi

Tracey Ullman - British Actress and Comedian

== See also ==
- Ullmann
