= Donald Othmer =

American scientist

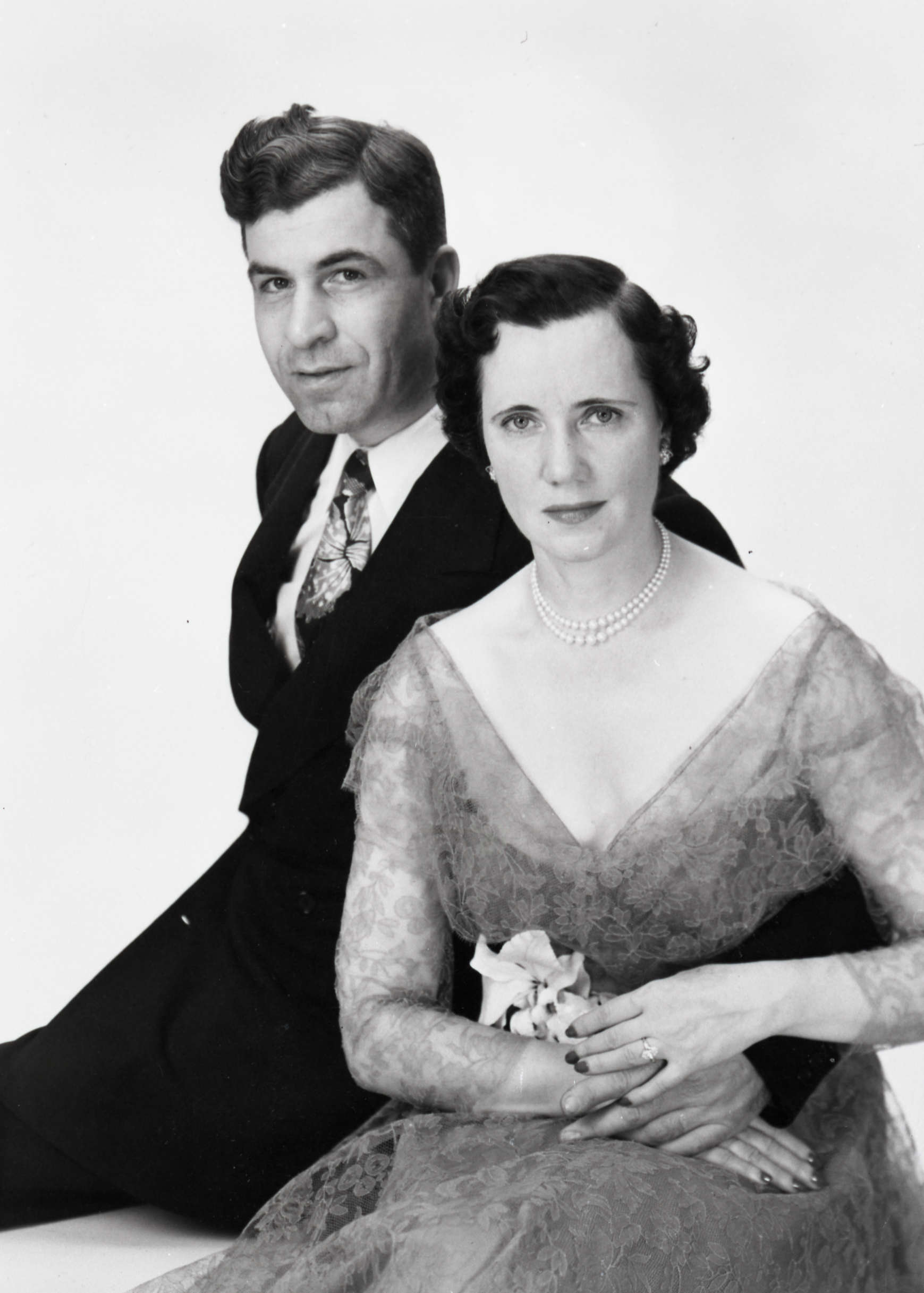
- Donald and Mildred Othmer, 1950
- Born: May 11, 1904; Omaha, Nebraska, U.S.
- Died: November 1, 1995 (aged 91); New York City, New York, U.S.
- Education: University of Nebraska (B.S., Chemical Engineering, 1924); University of Michigan (M.S., Chemical Engineering, 1925; Ph.D., Chemical Engineering, 1927)
- Awards: Chemical Pioneer Award (1977); Perkin Medal (1978); E. V. Murphree Award (1978)
- Scientific career
- Workplaces: Eastman Kodak, Polytechnic Institute of Brooklyn, Polytechnic University
- Thesis: The effect of temperature, purity and temperature drop on the rate of condensation of steam (1927)
- Doctoral advisor: Walter L. Badger

Donald Frederick Othmer (May 11, 1904 – November 1, 1995) was an American professor of chemical engineering, an inventor, multi-millionaire and philanthropist, whose most famous work is the Kirk-Othmer Encyclopedia of Chemical Technology, which is a major reference work in chemistry.

== Early life and education ==
Othmer was born in Omaha, Nebraska on May 11, 1904. He attended Omaha Central High School, then gained a scholarship to the chemical engineering program at Armour Institute of Technology (now Illinois Institute of Technology), in Chicago. However, he changed to the University of Nebraska, graduating in 1924 in Chemical Engineering. He completed a master's degree at the University of Michigan in 1925 and completed a doctorate in chemical engineering with a thesis entitled "The effect of temperature, purity and temperature drop on the rate of condensation of steam" at the same university in 1927.

== Professional life ==
From 1927 to 1931 he worked as an engineer at the Eastman Kodak Company in Rochester, New York, producing 40 patents. In 1932 he joined the Polytechnic Institute of Brooklyn as an instructor in the newly independent department of chemical engineering. He was to remain there. In 1937 he became head of department, which continued until 1961, when he was named distinguished professor. His duties ended in 1976 when he was made professor emeritus, but he never officially retired and was actively involved with what was by then the Polytechnic University until his death on November 1, 1995.

In 1950, following a divorce, he married his second wife, Mildred Jane Topp, also from Omaha, and an English major from the University of Nebraska. They were together for 45 years and she died in 1998.

== Accomplishments ==
He was a teacher for nearly 60 years, supervising many masters and doctoral students. While an academic, he continued to invent, and is credited with more than 150 US patents, as well as 350 papers, including important ones on the theory and practice of distillation.

In 1945, together with Dr. Raymond Eller Kirk (1890–1957), a chemist at the same institute, he began the work which became the Kirk-Othmer Encyclopedia of Chemical Technology, a major reference work. (At that time the only comparable reference work was Ullmann's Encyclopedia of Industrial Chemistry, in German.) In 1947 the first volume was published, and it was completed in 1949. The 5th edition was completed in 2007 with 27 volumes, which is the current (2021) edition.

For this and other achievements he received awards from the American Institute of Chemical Engineers, the American Chemical Society, the American Institute of Chemists and the Society of Chemical Industry. In 1987 he received the New York City Mayor's Award of Honor for Science and Technology. He was named by the readers of Chemical and Engineering News as one of the 75 greatest chemical scientists ever.

Beginning with a $25,000 investment in a Warren Buffett partnership in the early sixties, the Othmers accumulated a substantial stake in Berkshire Hathaway. At the time of Mildred Othmer's death, their estate totaled more than $750 million, much of which was disbursed in major bequests. These included Polytechnic University, Long Island College Hospital, Brooklyn, the University of Nebraska and the Chemical Heritage Foundation, resulting in the Othmer Library of Chemical History. A major bequest was made to Planned Parenthood of New York, resulting in the Othmer Institute.

He and his wife had supported many other causes in their lifetimes, particularly in the fields of local history, medical care and institutions related to chemistry and chemical engineering. They are commemorated by buildings and awards including the AIChE Sophomore Academic Excellence Award.

== Things named after Donald Othmer ==
- Othmer Building of the American Chemical Society.
- Othmer Building of the Long Island College Hospital.
- Othmer Gold Medal
- Othmer Hall houses the Department of Chemical and Biomolecular Engineering at the University of Nebraska–Lincoln.
- Othmer Institute of Planned Parenthood, New York.
- Othmer Library at the Center for Brooklyn History.
- Othmer Library of Chemical History of the Chemical Heritage Foundation.
- Othmer National Scholarship Awards of the American Institute of Chemical Engineers.
- Othmer Olympiad Endowment of the American Chemical Society.
- Othmer Residence Hall at NYU School of Engineering.
- Othmermeter: A simple device for measuring the somniferous power of a lecturer's speech pattern
- Othmer Still: A laboratory device for vapor-liquid equilibrium measurements.
