= Ullman =

Ullman is a surname. Notable people with the surname include:

- Al Ullman (1914–1986), American politician
- Berthold Ullman (1882–1965), American classical scholar
- Daniel Ullman (1810–1892), American politician and Civil War Union general
- Edward Ullman (1912–1976), American geographer
- Ellen Ullman, American author
- Elwood Ullman (1903–1985), American film comedy writer
- Eugene Paul Ullman (1877–1953) American Impressionist painter
- Harlan K. Ullman (born 1941), American political author and commentator
- James Ramsey Ullman (1907–1971), American writer and mountaineer
- Jeffrey Ullman (born 1942), American computer scientist
- Johan Ullman (born 1953), Swedish inventor
- Jordan Ullman, part of the duo Majid Jordan
- Leslie Ullman (born 1947), American poet
- Micha Ullman (born 1939), Israeli sculptor, professor of art
- Michael T. Ullman (born 1962), American neuroscientist
- Montague Ullman (1916–2008), American psychiatrist and parapsychologist
- Norm Ullman (born 1935), Canadian ice hockey forward
- Raviv Ullman (born 1986), Israeli-American actor
- Samuel Ullman (1840–1924), German-American poet
- Shimon Ullman (born 1948), Israeli computer scientist
- Torsten Ullman (1908–1993), Swedish pistol shooter
- Tracey Ullman (born 1959), British-American actress

== See also ==
- Poe v. Ullman, a United States Supreme Court case
- Sethi–Ullman algorithm, in computing, named after Jeffrey Ullman
- Ullmann
- Ulman
