= Irma Goldberg =

Organic chemist

- Born: 1871; Moscow
- Died: unknown
- Education: Geneva University
- Known for: Goldberg reaction, Jourdan-Ullman-Goldberg reaction
- Spouse: Fritz Ullmann
- Scientific career
- Fields: Organic Chemistry

Irma Goldberg (born 1871) was a Russian-born chemist. She was one of the first female organic chemists to have and sustain a successful career, her work even being quoted in her own name in standard textbooks.

== Life ==
=== Education ===
Born in Moscow to a Russian-Jewish family, she later traveled to Geneva in the 1890s to study chemistry at Geneva University.

=== Early research, Ullmann reaction ===
Her early research included the development of a process to remove sulfur and phosphorus from acetylene. Her first article on the derivatives of benzophenone, coauthored by German chemist Fritz Ullmann, was published in 1897. She also researched and wrote a paper (published in 1904) on using copper as a catalyst for the preparation of a phenyl derivative of thiosalicylic acid, a process known as the Ullmann reaction; This modification to previous forms of the method was a great improvement, and was extremely helpful for laboratory-scale preparations. She coordinated on other forms of chemistry research with her husband, Fritz Ullmann, in what they called the Ullmann-Goldberg collaborative.

=== Move to Berlin, synthetic dye research ===
In 1905, both Goldberg and Ullman moved to Technische Hochschule in Berlin. Goldberg's research, along with that of the Ullmann-Goldberg collaborative, was also a part of Germany's synthetic dye industry. Their research helped with the creation of the synthetic alizarin industry, or the process of replacing natural dye obtained from madder. In 1909, Goldberg also collaborated with Hermann Friedman to review German patents under BASF (Badische Anilin und Soda Fabrik) and Bayer & Co. Farbenfabriken, providing notes on preparation for 114 dyes.

=== Marriage and later life ===
In 1910, Goldberg married Ullman. In 1923, they moved back to Geneva when Ullman accepted a faculty position at Geneva University.

Her exact death date is not known, but her name does appear at the top of a list of people signing a memorial notice in a Geneva newspaper for her deceased husband, Fritz Ullmann in 1939.

Her last residence was in Prague before she was deported during The Holocaust in Bohemia and Moravia and was murdered in a camp.

== See also ==
- Timeline of women in science
