= Mikvah of Strasbourg =

Ritual Jewish bath in Strasbourg, France

- Mikvé de Strasbourg (French)
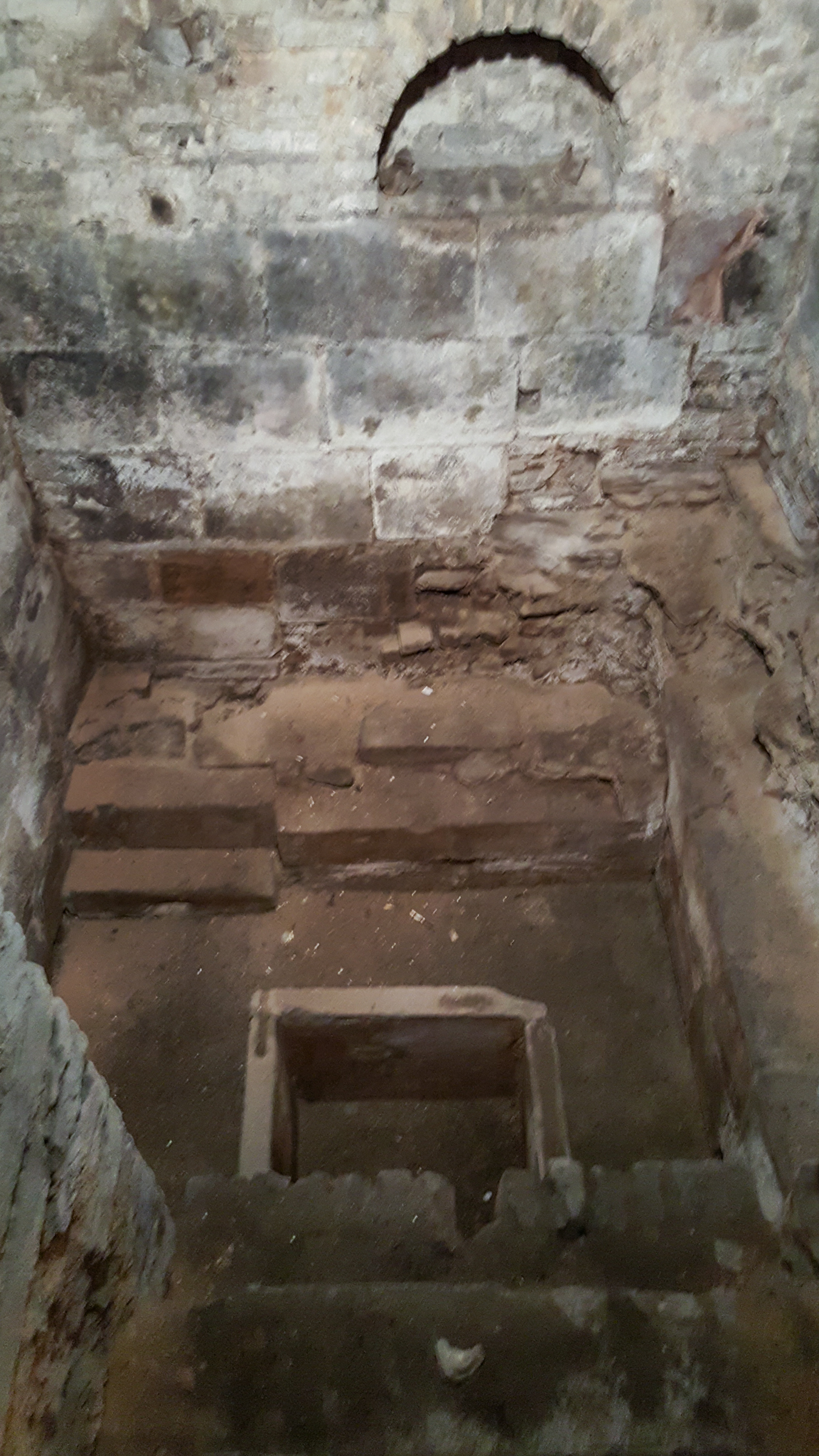
- Mikvah site, June 2018
- Interactive map of Mikvah of Strasbourg
- 48.5802°N 7.7527°E
- Type: Mikvah (Jewish ritual bath)
- Location: 20, rue des Charpentiers; Strasbourg, Bas-Rhin, Alsace; France

Monument historique
- Official name: Bain rituel juif présumé
- Designated: 1985
- Reference no.: PA00085013

The Mikvah (or Jewish ritual bath) of Strasbourg is a historic site in Strasbourg, in the French department of Bas-Rhin.

The site is unique as it connects to the Jewish heritage of Strasbourg that dates back to the Middle Ages.

== Location ==
The mikvah is located in a cave within a modern building at 20 rue des Charpentiers in the historic center of Strasbourg, midway between the Strabourg Cathedral and the Episcopal Palace of Strasbourg.

== Discovery ==
The ritual bath has been listed as a monuments historique since November 15, 1985.

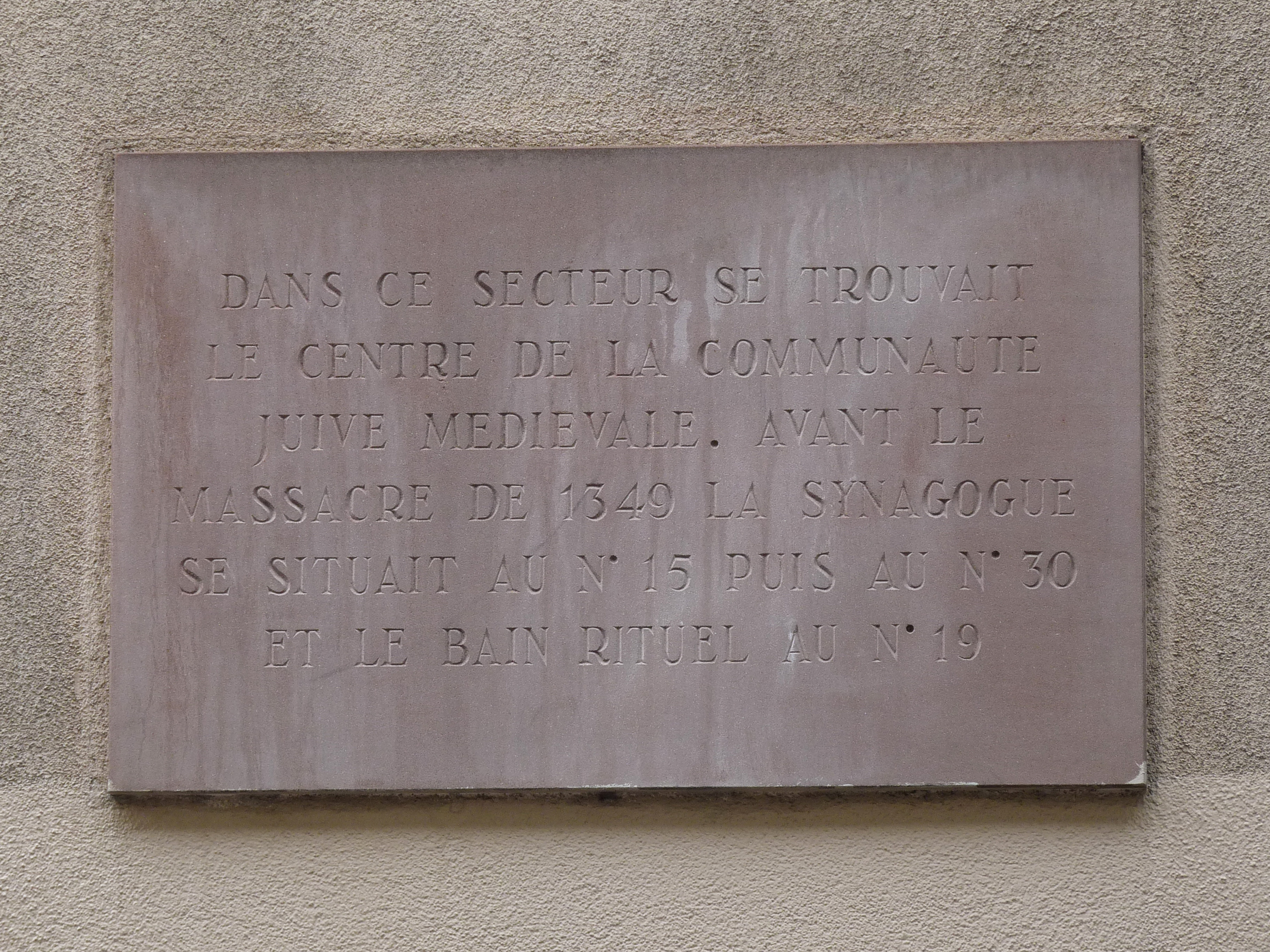
Commemorative plaque honoring the Jewish community of Strasbourg on Rue des Juifs

It was discovered in 1985 during a 1984 renovation of a group of houses at the corner of Rue des Juifs and Rue des Charpentiers. The buildings housed the ISTRA printing company until the 1980s.

The housing block was long known as being part of the perimeter of the Medieval Jewish life in Strasbourg. Oral traditions conserved the memory of the existence of a mikvah in this building (at 19 Rue des Juifs) to the point that in the 16th century the location was referred to as Zum Judenbad, or the Jewish Bath. Other than these stories, all other information or memory had been lost to history until its rediscovery.

Conscious of the risk that the planned demolition and renovation of the space would do to the ritual bath site, the Société d'Histoire des Israélites d'Alsace et de Lorraine (SHIAL) appealed to then Minister of Culture Jack Lang, and an agreement between the buyers and the public authorities was signed. The agreement allowed for a six-month stoppage in building work to organize an archaeological investigation of the site. The investigations brought to light the Mikvah site in its entirety.

The site currently serves as a public mikvah within a synagogue on site. Another private mikvah exists within a private residence on Rue des Juifs.

The monument is open for visits under certain conditions. Its opening to the public – along with the possibility of guided tours – is organized on certain days of the year by the Department of Culture for the City of Strasbourg.

== History ==
The first Jews arrived in Strasbourg around 1150, coming from nearby German towns along the Palatinate, including Mayence, Spire, and Worms.

The mikvah was constructed a short time after the arrival of the community, around 1200. At the same time, the Jewish community in Strasbourg was flourishing, with community members working as merchants along European trade routes.

The situation for the Jews in Strasbourg began to deteriorate at the beginning of the 14th century, due to economic competition from local bourgeoise and increased Jewish immigration from other areas. It worsened in 1347, when Jews were accused of having propagated the Black Death. In 1349, the synagogue in Strasbourg was pillaged and hundreds of Jews were massacred in the Jewish cemetery in town (now location of Place de la République). Survivors of the massacre were given the decision to either convert or flee. Some Jews decided to return to Strasbourg in 1362, but Strasbourg banned Jews from settling in the city in 1391, a ban that would stay in place for 400 years, only overturned after the French Revolution.

After the Jewish community was forced out of Strasbourg in the 1390s, the mikvah was turned into a well. This well was found during excavation of the mikvah site.

== Architecture ==
The Mikvah is an approximately 3m square room of grey sandstone topped by a red brick barrel vault.

At four corners of the room, near the upper part of the vault, are four Romanesque stone corbels.

The basin at the center of the room can hold at least 500 liters of purified water, coming directly from primarily groundwater (rainwater can be used as mikvah water under Jewish law, but it is not relevant in the case of this particular mikvah). Today, the groundwater is no longer visible, as the water table in that neighborhood is 8 meters below street level.

At the center of the barrel vault, there is a circular zenith hole of about 0.9 meters. This hole is believed to be used for the collection of rainwater in addition to the groundwater. In Alsace, groundwater is easily accessible, thus the mikvah primarily uses these two sources for its water.

The remains of a staircase of grey and pink sandstone remain visible at the mikvah. The staircase led from the entrance of the bath, at the basement level of the building, down to the water table. The last step of the staircase opens to the bath itself. Part of the steps in the staircase were reused in the construction of a well following the departure of the Jews from the building.

Two niches are visible on the walls, used for the placement of candles.

At the bottom of the basin lies a wooden structure of about 1.7 m by 1.5 m. This structure, whose interlocking angles are characteristic of the 11th or 12th century, was probably retaining formwork associated with the construction of the bath.

The opening of the well found during the excavation of the area, was off-center in relation to the zenith hole at the top of the vault. This continues archaeological questions about the site. Work to clear the mikvah area has left the base of this well, represented by four large stone slabs 1 meter wide, 1.3 meters high and 12 cm thick.

It is believed that the room next to the square room was used for people to undress before entering the Mikvah.

== See also ==
- History of the Jews in Alsace
