= Judeo-Alsatian Museum =

Museum in France

Coordinates: 48°49′32″N 7°28′49″E

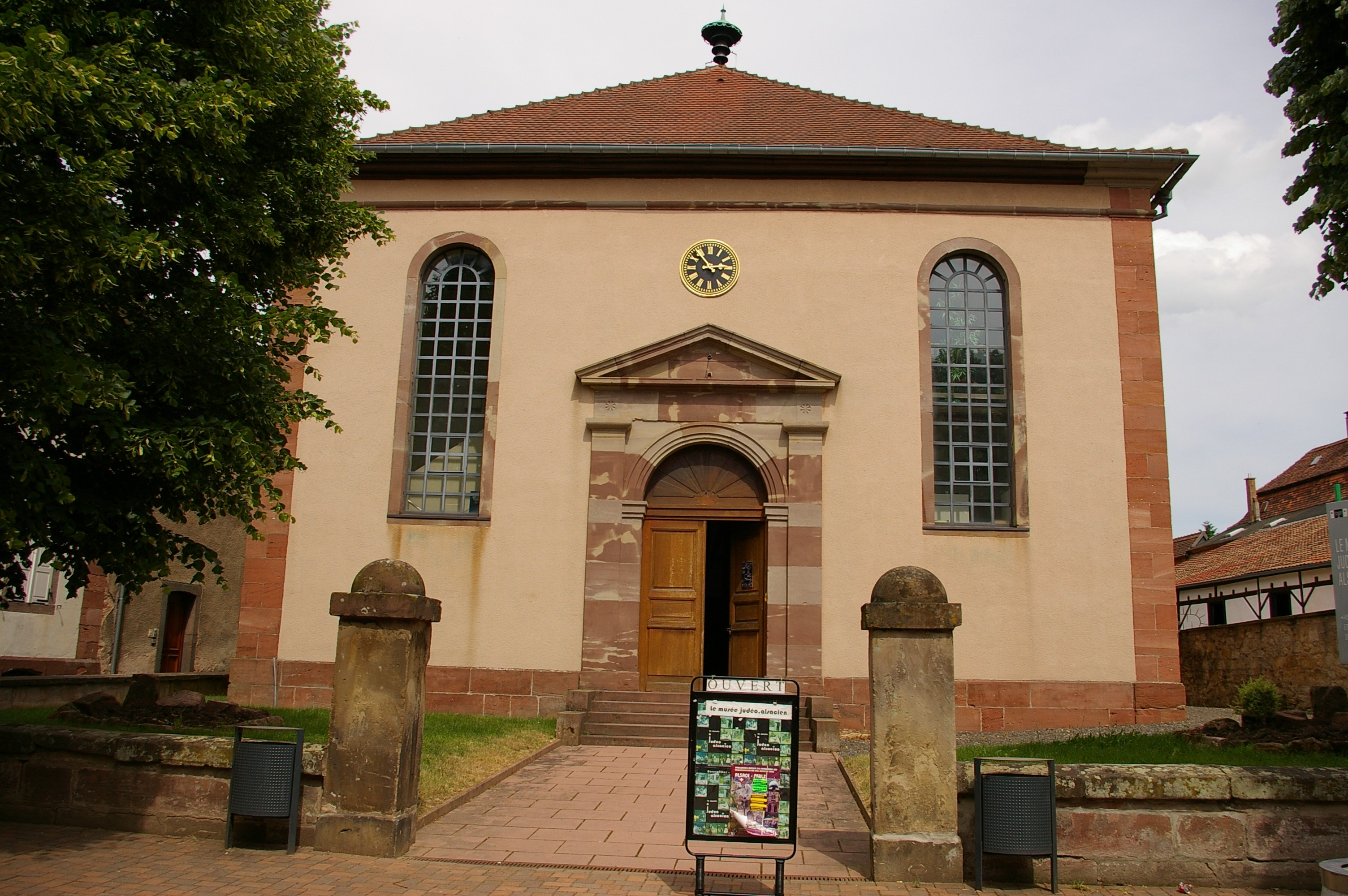
Entrance of the Synagogue where the museum is located

The Judeo-Alsatian Museum (French: le Musée judéo-alsacien) is a museum in Bouxwiller in the Bas-Rhin department of France. Housed in a former synagogue, the museum describes the Jewish culture and history of the Jews of Alsace.

== See also ==
- History of the Jews in Alsace
- List of museums in France
