= Ullmann condensation =

Copper-promoted cross-coupling reactions

Named after	Fritz Ullmann
Reaction type	Coupling reaction

Identifiers
Organic Chemistry Portal	ullmann-reaction
RSC ontology ID	RXNO:0000081

The Ullmann condensation or Ullmann-type reaction is the copper-promoted conversion of aryl halides to aryl ethers, aryl thioethers, aryl nitriles, and aryl amines. These reactions are examples of cross-coupling reactions.

Ullmann-type reactions are comparable to Buchwald–Hartwig reactions but usually require higher temperatures. Traditionally, these reactions require high-boiling, polar solvents such as N-methylpyrrolidone, nitrobenzene, or dimethylformamide and high temperatures (often in excess of 210 °C) with stoichiometric amounts of copper. Aryl halides are required to be activated by electron-withdrawing groups. Traditional Ullmann style reactions used "activated" copper powder, e.g. prepared in situ by the reduction of copper sulfate by zinc metal in hot water. The methodology improved with the introduction of soluble copper catalysts supported by diamines and acetylacetonate ligands.

== Ullmann ether synthesis: C-O coupling ==
Illustrative of the traditional Ullmann ether synthesis is the preparation of p-nitrophenyl phenyl ether from 4-chloronitrobenzene and phenol.

O_{2}NC_{6}H_{4}Cl + C_{6}H_{5}OH + KOH → O_{2}NC_{6}H_{4}O−C_{6}H_{5} + KCl + H_{2}O

Copper is used as a catalyst, either in the form of the metal or copper salts. Modern arylations use soluble copper catalysts.

== Goldberg reaction: C-N coupling ==
A traditional Goldberg reaction involves reaction of an aniline with an aryl halide. The coupling of 2-chlorobenzoic acid and aniline is illustrative:

C_{6}H_{5}NH_{2} + ClC_{6}H_{4}CO_{2}H + KOH → C_{6}H_{5}N(H)−C_{6}H_{4}CO_{2}H + KCl + H_{2}O

A typical catalyst is formed from copper(I) iodide and phenanthroline. The reaction is an alternative to the Buchwald–Hartwig amination reaction.

Aryl iodides are more reactive arylating agents than are aryl chlorides, following the usual pattern. Electron-withdrawing groups on the aryl halide also accelerate the coupling.

== Hurtley reaction: C-C coupling ==
The nucleophile can also be carbon including carbanions as well as cyanide. In the traditional Hurtley reaction, the carbon nucleophiles were derived from malonic ester and other dicarbonyl compounds:

Z_{2}CH_{2} + BrC_{6}H_{4}CO_{2}H + KOH → Z_{2}C(H)−C_{6}H_{4}CO_{2}H + KBr + H_{2}O (Z = CO_{2}H)

More modern Cu-catalyzed C-C cross-couplings utilize soluble copper complexes containing phenanthroline ligands.

== C–S coupling ==
The arylation of alkylthiolates proceeds by the intermediacy of cuprous thiolates.

== Mechanism of Ullmann-type reactions ==
In the case of Ullmann-type reactions (aminations, etherifications, etc. of aryl halides), the conversions involve copper(I) alkoxide, copper(I) amides, copper(I) thiolates. The copper(I) reagent can be generated in situ from the aryl halide and copper metal. Even copper(II) sources are effective under some circumstances. A number of innovations have been developed with regard to copper reagents.

These copper(I) compounds subsequently react with the aryl halide in a net metathesis reaction:

Ar−X + CuOR → Ar−OR + CuX
Ar−X + CuSR → Ar−SR + CuX
Ar−X + CuNHR → Ar−NHR + CuX

In the case of C-N coupling, kinetic studies implicate oxidative addition reaction followed by reductive elimination from Cu(III) intermediates (L_{n} = one or more spectator ligands):

ROCuAr(X)L_{n} → RO−Ar + CuL_{n}

== History ==
The Ullmann ether synthesis is named after its inventor, Fritz Ullmann. The corresponding Goldberg reaction, is named after Irma Goldberg. The Hurtley reaction, which involves C-C bond formation, is similarly named after its inventor.
