= Ullmann's Encyclopedia of Industrial Chemistry =

Industrial chemistry reference work

- Original title: Enzyklopädie der Technischen Chemie
- Language: German; English
- Subject: Industrial chemistry
- Publisher: Wiley
- Publication date: 1914–1984
- English publication date: 1985
- Media type: print & online
- ISBN: 978-3-527-30673-2

Ullmann's Encyclopedia of Industrial Chemistry is a major reference work related to industrial chemistry by chemist Fritz Ullmann, first published in 1914, and exclusively in German as "Enzyklopädie der Technischen Chemie" until 1984.

== History ==
Ullmann's Encyclopedia of Industrial Chemistry is a major reference work related to industrial chemistry by chemist Fritz Ullmann. Its first edition was published in German by Fritz Ullmann in 1914. The fourth edition, published 1972 to 1984, already contained 25 volumes. The fifth edition, published 1985 to 1996, was the first version available in English. In 1997, the first online version was published. The year 2014 marked its centenary.

As of 2016, Ullmann's Encyclopedia was in its seventh edition, in 40 volumes, including one index volume and more than 1,050 articles (200 more than the sixth edition), approximately 30,000 pages, 22,000 images, 8,000 tables, 19,000 references and 85,000 indices. Furthermore, Ullmann's Encyclopedia has been continuously updated with new online by multiple authors as of January 2026, primarily on the Wiley Online Library.

== Editions ==
=== German ===
1. 1914–1922: 1st edition in 12 volumes, which can be viewed online (hosted by Internet Archive)
2. 1928–1932: 2nd edition in 11 volumes
3. 1951–1970: 3rd edition in 22 volumes, of which volume 2 is in two sub-volumes
4. 1972–1984: 4th edition in 25 volumes, last edition in German language

=== English ===
1. 1985–1996: 5th edition, in English only, titled Ullmann's Encyclopedia of Industrial Chemistry, in 36 volumes
2. 2002–2007: 6th edition in 40 volumes
3. 2011–2014: 7th edition in 40 print volumes, with ongoing changes and additions to the online edition

== Editors and contributors ==
Barbara Elvers (Wiley-VCH) is currently Senior Editorial Advisor and Claudia Ley is Editor-in-Chief, both Wiley-VCH. The Editorial Board has around 20 members from different nations.

The encyclopedia is a multi-author work. Around 3,000 international authors from universities and industry contributed to it.

== Topics ==
Note: The "topics" are a selection of related articles provided by Wiley Online Library. The number (#) indicates that, for example, 15 articles relate to the main branch of agrochemicals. The numbers do not exactly sum up to the total number of articles (1,050), but its sole purpose is for organizing and categorizing the large number of articles where possible. (no. of articles shown are as of January 31, 2026)

- Agrochemicals (15)
- Analytical Techniques (30)
- Biochemistry & Biotechnology (27)
- Chemical Reactions (14)
- Dyes and Pigments (30)
- Energy (25)
- Environmental Protection and Industrial Safety (30)
- Fat, Oil, Food and Feed, Cosmetics (44)
- Inorganic Chemicals (75)
- Materials (39)
- Metals and Alloys (46)
- Organic Chemicals (136)
- Pharmaceuticals (80)
- Polymers and Plastics (60)
- Processes & Process Engineering (86)
- Renewable Resources (21)
- Special Topics (68)

== Kirk-Othmer Encyclopedia of Chemical Technology ==
In the 1940s, American Chemists Donald F. Othmer and Raymond E. Kirk from New York University began to create an English counterpart to Ullmann, named the Kirk-Othmer Encyclopedia of Chemical Technology. It was originally published by Wiley, which in 1996 took over the German Wiley-VCH publishing house and thus has combined the two encyclopedias ever since. The German chemistry magazine CHEManager wrote, quote: "In a double pack, the two companion works are simply unbeatable, because the knowledge gathered in both offers answers (almost) all questions that can arise in connection with chemical products and processes". These two encyclopedias were compared in Reference Reviews in 2007.

As of 2004, Kirk-Othmer is in its 5th edition with more than 1,300 articles in 27 volumes with over 22,950 pages.
