= Harrison Ullmann =

American journalist

- Born: June 3, 1936
- Died: April 15, 2000
- Burial place: Crown Hill Cemetery and Arboretum, Section Community Mausoleum, Lot 115; 39.8274766°N 86.1730061°W
- Occupation: Journalist

Harrison J. Ullmann (June 3, 1936 – April 15, 2000) was a journalist in Indiana and a political commentator. Ullmann was editor of NUVO Newsweekly, an Indianapolis alternative newspaper, from 1992 until shortly before his death in 2000. Ullmann was known for his provocative style and acerbic wit that was often aimed at Indiana politicians.

Harrison had...

"the journalistic courage to take on the power structure, tell the king he had no clothes, unmask deceitfulness and self-righteousness, and raise important questions about conflicts of interest and unintended consequences of public policies," former Indianapolis Mayor William Hudnut said, "Every community needs at least one Harrison Ullmann, preferably more.

Ullmann had a long career as a newspaper reporter, columnist, editor and even spent a decade as the director of public relations for Indiana University-Purdue University Indianapolis. Once leaving the university, Ullmann began writing an opinion column for NUVO. The sometimes controversial column ranged in subject from humorous observations to serious investigations into the local power structure. After writing the column for several years, he was recruited by publisher Kevin McKinney to become the newsweekly's editor. While leading the paper's editorial staff, the paper grew in circulation from 20,000 to 50,000.

In 2003 Ullmann was recognized for his reporting and advocacy by organizations including the Indiana State Teacher's Association, the Indiana State Medical Association and the American Civil Liberties Union. On April 12, 2000, he was awarded the Sagamore of the Wabash by Governor Frank O'Bannon, the highest honor the state can award. Ullmann was inducted into the Indiana Journalism Hall of Fame in 2003.

According to fellow Hoosier journalist, Brian Howey, "Harrison had an incredible ability to passionately connect with his audience through his columns and stories. They were anything from touching to hilarious, to scathing. During his last seven years, he became the conscience of Indianapolis as he wrote about education, public policy, politics and culture."
