= Ullmann reaction =

Coupling reaction of aryl or alkyl groups

Named after	Fritz Ullmann
Reaction type	Coupling reaction

Identifiers
Organic Chemistry Portal	ullmann-reaction
RSC ontology ID	RXNO:0000040

The Ullmann reaction or Ullmann coupling, named after Fritz Ullmann, couples two aryl or alkyl groups with the help of copper. The reaction was first reported by Ullmann and his student Bielecki in 1901. Palladium and nickel can also be effectively used.

Ullman overview

Aryl-aryl bond formation is a fundamental tool in modern organic synthesis, with applications spanning natural product synthesis, pharmaceuticals, agrochemicals, and the development of commercial dyes and polyaromatics. With over a century of history, the Ullmann reaction was one of the first to use a transition metal, copper, in its higher oxidation states. Despite the significant implications of biaryl coupling in industries, the Ullmann reaction was plagued by a number of problems in its early development. However, in modern times, the Ullmann reaction has enjoyed revived interest due to the advantages of copper over other catalytic metals.

== Mechanism ==
The reaction mechanism of the Ullmann reaction has been extensively studied. Electron spin resonance rules out a radical intermediate. This was confirmed in a set of experiments performed in 2008 by Hartwig and co-workers. The oxidative addition/reductive elimination sequence observed with palladium catalysts is unlikely with copper because copper(III) is rarely observed. The reaction likely involves the formation of an organocopper compound (RCuX) which reacts with the other aryl reactant in a nucleophilic aromatic substitution. Alternative mechanisms have been proposed such as σ-bond metathesis. The simplified mechanism shown below is generally accepted.

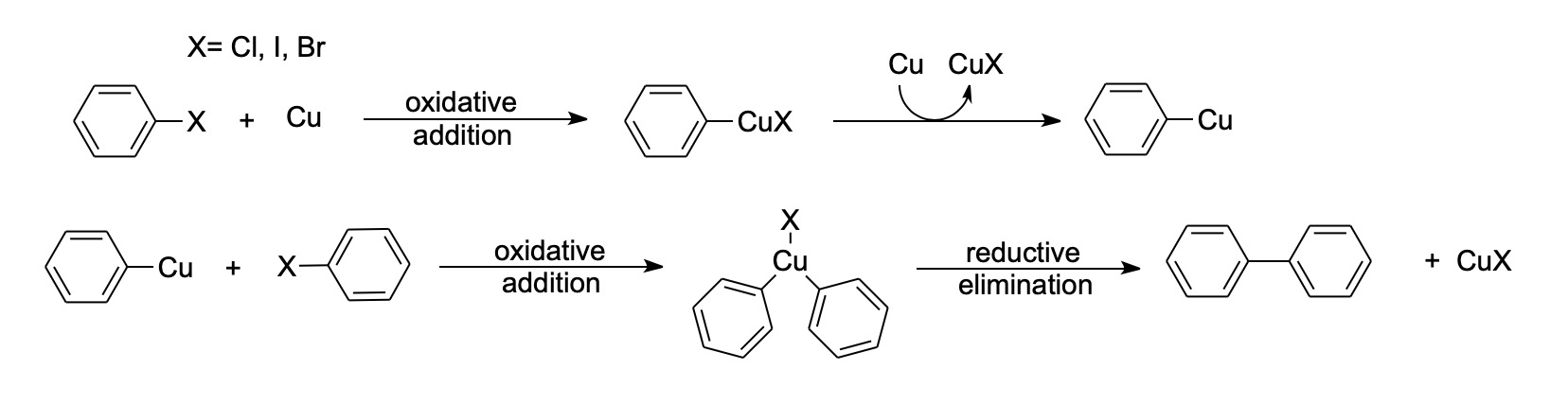

== Scope ==
Fritz Ullmann and his student Bielecki first reported the reaction. This groundbreaking result was the first to show that a transition metal could facilitate carbon–carbon bond formation between aryl compounds.

A typical example of classic Ullmann biaryl coupling is the conversion of ortho-chloronitrobenzene into 2,2′-dinitrobiphenyl using a copper/bronze alloy.

2 C_{6}H_{4}(NO_{2})Cl + 2 Cu → (C_{6}H_{4}(NO_{2}))_{2} + 2 CuCl

The reaction has been applied to fairly elaborate substrates.

Ullmann reaction

The traditional Ullmann reaction requires stoichiometric equivalents of copper, harsh reaction conditions, is limited to electron-deficient aryl halides (hence the 2-nitrophenyl chloride example above), and provides erratic yields. However, many improvements and alternative procedures have been introduced. Modern Ullman reaction variants employing palladium and nickel have widened the reaction substrate scope and used milder reaction conditions. Yields are generally still moderate, however. In organic synthesis, this reaction is often replaced by palladium coupling reactions such as the Heck reaction, the Hiyama coupling, and the Sonogashira coupling.

Biphenylenes had been obtained before with reasonable yields using 2,2-diiodobiphenyl or 2,2-diiodobiphenylonium ion as starting material.

Closure of 5-membered rings is most facile, but larger rings have also been made using this approach.

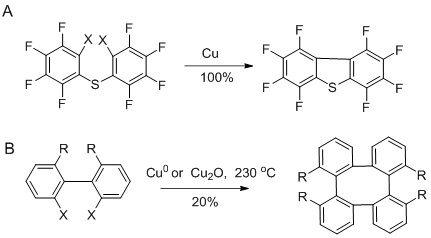
Modern developments also include the use of heterogeneous copper catalysts and nanoparticles. These are highly desirable, as the catalyst can be easily separated from the products, reducing waste and cost. In the case of copper nanoparticles, the catalytic activity depends on the particle size and its tendency to form aggregates.

== Bidentate ligands for Ullmann Coupling ==
Around the year 2000, various bidentate ligands were found to improve the efficiency of the Ullmann reaction. Bidentate ligands allow for milder reaction conditions and higher functional group tolerance. They included amino acids, oxines, Schiff bases, and many other O-O or N-N bidentates. These initial bidentate systems elevated the practicality of Ullmann reactions but it still had drawbacks. High loadings of copper and ligand were required and activation of the notoriously difficult aryl-chloride was still not possible. These problems were solved in 2015 with the design of special oxalic diamine ligands (oxalamide ligands), making the Ullmann reaction viable for industrial application.

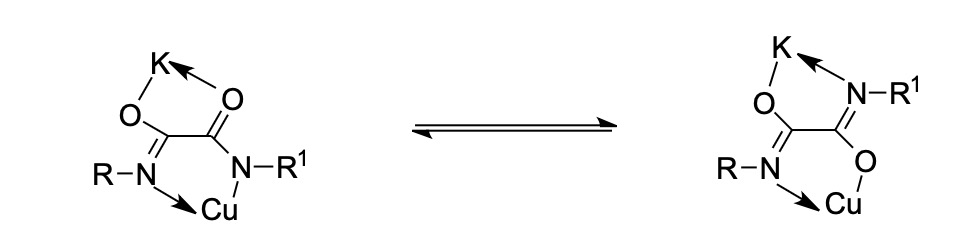

== Unsymmetric and asymmetric couplings ==
Ullmann synthesis of biaryl compounds can be used to generate chiral products from chiral reactants. Nelson and collaborators worked on the synthesis of asymmetric biaryl compounds and obtained the thermodynamically controlled product.

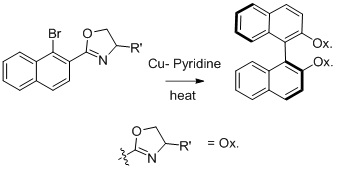

The diastereomeric ratio of the products is enhanced with bulkier R groups in the auxiliary oxazoline group.

Unsymmetrical Ullmann reactions are rarely pursued but have been achieved when one of the two coupling components is in excess.

== Industrial Applications ==
Aqueous Ullmann reactions have been used on the pilot plant scale.

== See also ==
- Ullmann condensation - copper-promoted conversion of aryl halides to ethers, also developed by Fritz Ullmann
- Copper(I) thiophene-2-carboxylate, a copper reagent used in the Ullmann reaction
- Wurtz–Fittig reaction, a similar reaction useful for alkylbenzenes synthesis
