= Albert Ulmann =

American author and banker (born 1861)

Albert Ulmann (born 1861) was an American banker and author.

Ulmann was a graduate of the College of the City of New York. He became a member of the New York Stock Exchange in 1900.
