= Fritz Ullmann =

German chemist (1875–1939)

- Born: July 2, 1875; Fürth, Germany
- Died: March 17, 1939 (aged 63); Berlin, Germany
- Education: University of Geneva
- Known for: Enzyklopädie der Technischen Chemie, Ullmann reaction, Ullmann condensation
- Scientific career
- Workplaces: Technische Universität Berlin, University of Geneva
- Doctoral advisor: Carl Gräbe

Fritz Ullmann (July 2, 1875 in Fürth – March 17, 1939 in Berlin) was a German chemist.

Ullmann was born in Fürth and started studying chemistry in Nuremberg, but received his PhD of the University of Geneva for work with Carl Gräbe in 1895. After some time in Geneva he went to Berlin in 1905. Ullmann taught technical chemistry during 1905-1913 and 1922-1925 at the Technischen Hochschule Berlin (now Technische Universität Berlin), first as part of the ordinary teaching staff, later on as a professor. In 1900 he introduced dimethyl sulfate as an alkylating agent. Between 1914 and 1922, when he was back in Geneva, he published the first edition of the "Enzyklopädie der Technischen Chemie" in 12 volumes (ISBN 3527201424) in English the Ullmann's Encyclopedia of Industrial Chemistry, a publication that exists to this day. He was married to Irma Goldberg who was his assistant from 1905 to 1910 at his laboratory.

They named after themselves the following reactions: the Ullmann reaction, the Ullmann condensation, the Graebe-Ullmann synthesis, the Goldberg reaction and the illustrious Jordan-Ullmann-Goldberg synthesis.
