= Alexander de Erény Ullmann =

Hungarian politician (1850–1897)

Alexander de Erény Ullmann (Hungarian: Erényi Ullmann Sándor, 18 February 1850, in Budapest – 1897, in Budapest), was a Jewish Hungarian deputy and political economist. He was a son of Karl Ullmann (1809 – 1880), founder of the first Hungarian insurance company, and vice-president of the Bank of Commerce at Pest.

Ullmann was educated in Budapest and Vienna (LL.D. 1872), and was admitted to the bar in 1873. On the death of his father the family was elevated to the Hungarian nobility. From 1884 to 1892 Ullmann represented the electoral district of Also-Arpas in the Hungarian Parliament.

In addition to numerous juridical and economic essays in the Pester Lloyd, Ellenör, and Neuzeit, Ullmann wrote the following works: A Részvényes Kereseti Jogáról (Budapest, 1877), on the right of stockholders to institute legal proceedings; A Kényszeregyezség Kérdéséhez (ib. 1879), on compulsory settlements; Az Ipartörvény Reviziója (ib. 1880), on the revision of the industrial laws; A Magyar Kereskedelmi és Iparkamarák Reformja (ib. 1882), on the reform of the Hungarian board of trade and commerce; and Zsidó Felekezeti Ügyek Rendezése (ib. 1888), on the legal regulation of Jewish affairs.
