= Benjamin Ulmann =

French painter (1829–1884)

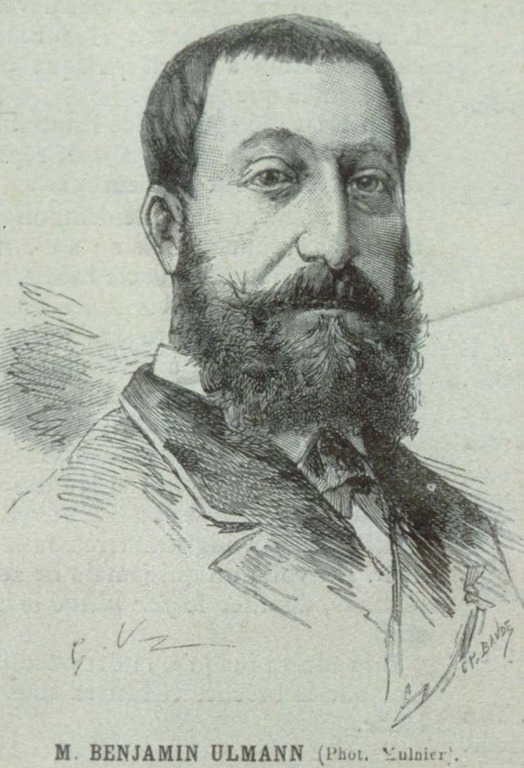
Benjamin Ulmann

Benjamin Ulmann (24 May 1829 – 24 February 1884) was a French painter of Jewish descent. Born at Blotzheim (Haut Rhin) in 1829, he became a pupil of Michel Martin Drolling and of François-Édouard Picot, and entered the Ecole des Beaux Arts in 1849. He gained the prix de Rome in 1859, and profited much by his studies in Italy. He exhibited a number of works at the Salon from 1855 onwards, chiefly portraits and historical subjects, and was commissioned to paint some pictures for the Palais Royal and for the Palais de Justice. His Sylla and Manus is in the Luxembourg Palace, and other works by him are in the Museums of Le Mans, Marseille, Melun, and Colmar. He died in 1884.
