= Ulman =

Ulman is both a surname and a given name. Notable people with the name include:

Surname:

- Amalia Ulman (born 1989), Argentine-Spanish artist and film director
- Avrohom Yitzchok Ulman (living person), Hungarian-born haredi rabbi
- Bernie Ulman (1917–1986), American football and lacrosse official
- Kamil Ulman (born 1979), Polish goalkeeper
- Kenneth Ulman (born 1974), American politician
- William A. Ulman (1907–1979), American writer and WWII-era soldier

Given name:

- Ulman Owens (1878–1931), American lighthouse keeper
- Ulman Stromer (1329–1407), German factory owner.

== See also ==
- Ulman, Missouri
- Ullmann
