= Operation Torch order of battle =

World War II order of battle

Operation Torch was the Allied invasion of French North Africa between 8 and 16 November 1942 during World War II. It was intended to distract the Axis forces from the Eastern front and thereby relieve the Soviet Union of the pressure it was facing to fight them. The invasion led to Oran's surrender on 10 November and France's agreement to an armistice with the Allies. Involved were British and American forces, organized into the Western, Central and Eastern task forces, which landed on beaches near Casablanca, Oran, and Algiers, respectively.

== Overview ==
=== Western Task Force – Morocco ===
Ground and naval commanders for Western Task Force

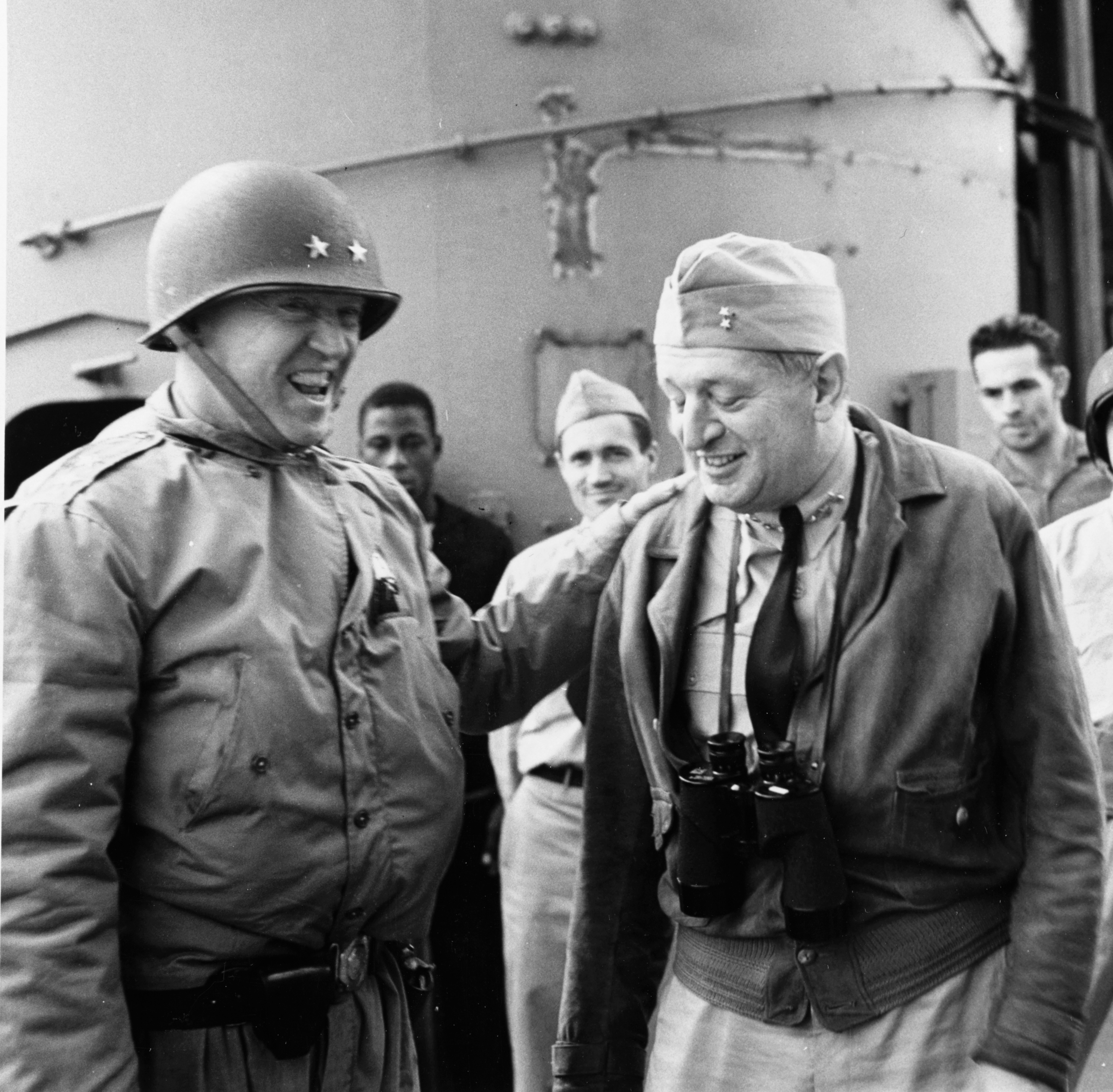
Major General George S. Patton, United States Army, and Rear Admiral H. Kent Hewitt, United States Navy aboard the heavy cruiser Augusta

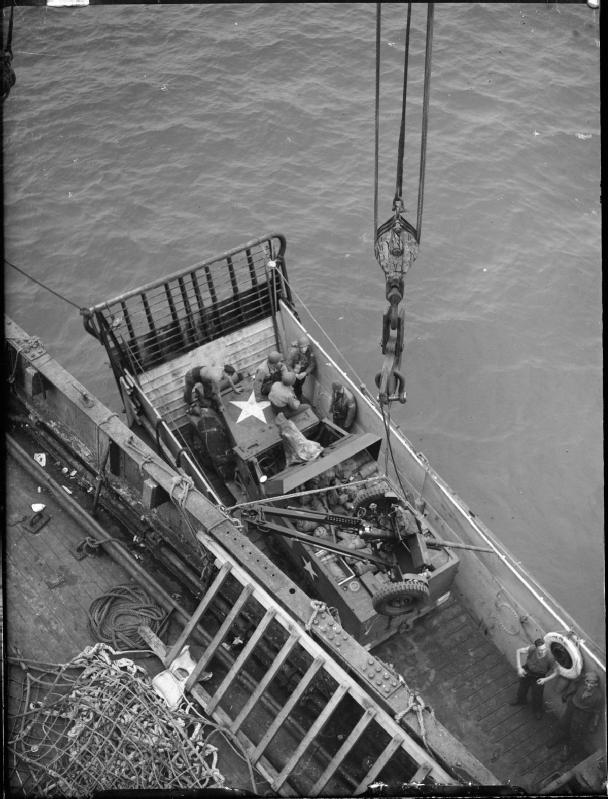
A half track and anti-tank gun are loaded onto a landing craft during Operation Torch.

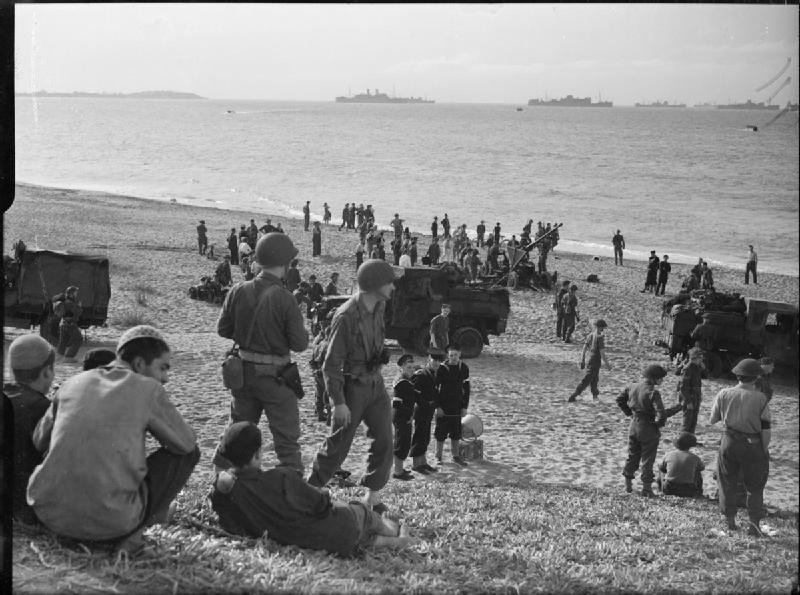
British sailors and British and American soldiers on the beach near Algiers

Vice Admiral H. Kent Hewitt, USN

Task Group 34.1 covering force

Battleship USS Massachusetts (Capt. Whiting)
Heavy cruisers USS Wichita (Capt. Low) and USS Tuscaloosa (Capt. Gillette)
Destroyers USS Wainwright, USS Mayrant, USS Rhind and USS Jenkins
Tanker USS Chemung

Task Group 34.2 Carrier group

Aircraft carrier USS Ranger (Capt. Durgin)
Escort carrier USS Suwannee (Capt. Clark)
Light cruiser USS Cleveland (Capt. Burrough)
Destroyers USS Ellyson, USS Forrest, USS Fitch, USS Corry and USS Hobson
Tanker USS Winooski

Task Group 34.8 Northern task force

Battleship USS Texas (Capt. Pfaff)
Escort carriers USS Sangamon (Capt. Wieber) and USS Chenango (Capt. Wyatt)
Light cruiser USS Savannah (Capt. Fiske)
Destroyers USS Roe, USS Livermore, USS Kearny, USS Ericsson, USS Parker, USS Hambleton, USS Macomb, USS Dallas and USS Eberle
Submarine USS Shad
Submarine tender USS Barnegat
Minesweepers USS Raven and USS Osprey
Tanker USS Kennebec
8 transport ships

Task Group 34.9 Center task force

Heavy cruiser USS Augusta (Capt. Hutchins)
Light cruiser USS Brooklyn (Capt. Denebrink)
Destroyers USS Wilkes, USS Swanson, USS Ludlow, USS Murphy, USS Bristol, USS Woolsey, USS Edison, USS Tillman, USS Doyle and USS Rowan
Submarines USS Gunnel and USS Herring
15 transport ships
6 mine hunting vessels

Task Group 34.10 Southern task force

Battleship USS New York (Capt. Umsted)
Escort carrier USS Santee (Capt. Sample)
Light cruiser USS Philadelphia (Capt. Hendren)
Destroyers USS Mervine, USS Knight, USS Beatty, USS Cowie, USS Quick, USS Doran, USS Cole, USS Bernadou, USS Rodman and USS Emmons
Submarine USS Barb
Tankers USS Housatonic and USS Merrimack
3 mine hunting ships
6 transport ships

US I Armored Corps

Major General George S. Patton, USA

Northern Attack Group (Mehedia)
Brig. Gen. Lucian K. Truscott (9,099 officers and enlisted)

60th Infantry Regiment (Reinforced) of 9th Infantry Division
1st Battalion of 66th Armored Regiment of 2nd Armored Division
1st Battalion of 540th Engineers

Centre Attack Group (Fedhala)
Maj. Gen. J. W. Anderson (18,783 officers and enlisted)

3rd Infantry Division

7th Infantry Regiment (Reinforced)
15th Infantry Regiment (Reinforced)
30th Infantry Regiment (Reinforced)

Southern Attack Group (Safi)
Maj. Gen. Ernest N. Harmon (6,423 officers and enlisted)

47th Regimental Combat Team of 9th Infantry Division
3rd and elements of 2nd Battalion of 67th Armored Regiment of 2nd Armored Division

=== French forces in Morocco ===
Général de division Georges Lascroux

Division	Regiments and others
Casablanca Division Général de division Émile Béthouart	Infantry: 1st Moroccan Tirailleurs Regiment; 6th Moroccan Tirailleurs Regiment; Colonial Infantry Regiment of Morocco; III/6th Senegalese Tirailleurs Regiment; Cavalry: 1st Chasseurs d'Afrique Regiment; 3rd Moroccan Spahi Regiment; Artillery: Colonial Artillery Regiment of Morocco; Guard: I/9th Guard Regiment
Fez Division Général de brigade Maurice-Marie Salbert	Infantry: 4th Moroccan Tirailleurs Regiment; 5th Moroccan Tirailleurs Regiment; 11th Algerian Tirailleurs Regiment; III/3rd Foreign Infantry Regiment; I/6th Senegalese Tirailleurs Regiment; Cavalry: 1st Foreign Cavalry Regiment; Artillery: 63rd Artillery Regiment of Africa; Guard: IV/9th Guard Regiment
Marrakesh Division Général de division Henry Martin	Infantry: 2nd Moroccan Tirailleurs Regiment; 2nd Foreign Infantry Regiment; II/6th Senegalese Tirailleurs Regiment; Cavalry: 4th Moroccan Spahi Regiment; Artillery: Colonial Artillery Regiment of Morocco; Guard: II/9th Guard Regiment
Meknes Division Général de division André Dody	Infantry: 7th Moroccan Tirailleurs Regiment; 8th Moroccan Tirailleurs Regiment; 3rd Foreign Infantry Regiment; Cavalry: 3rd Moroccan Spahi Regiment; 10th Chasseurs d'Afrique Autonomous Group; Artillery: 64th Artillery Regiment of Africa; Guard: III/9th Guard Regiment

=== Covering Task Force - Force H - Mediterranean ===
ViceAdmiral Edward Neville Syfret, RN

Aircraft carriers HMS Victorious, HMS Formidable and HMS Furious
Battleships HMS Duke of York, HMS Rodney and HMS Nelson
Battle cruiser HMS Renown
light cruisers HMS Bermuda, HMS Argonaut and HMS Sirius
17 Destroyers

=== Central Task Force – Oran ===
Ground and naval commanders for Central Task Force

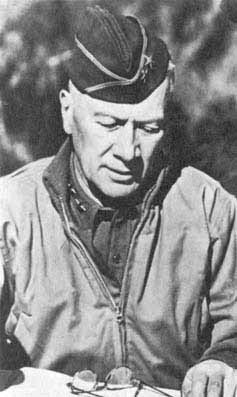
Maj. Gen. Lloyd R. Fredendall, USA

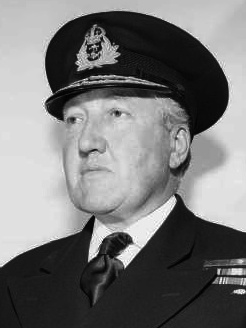
Commodore Thomas Hope Troubridge, RN

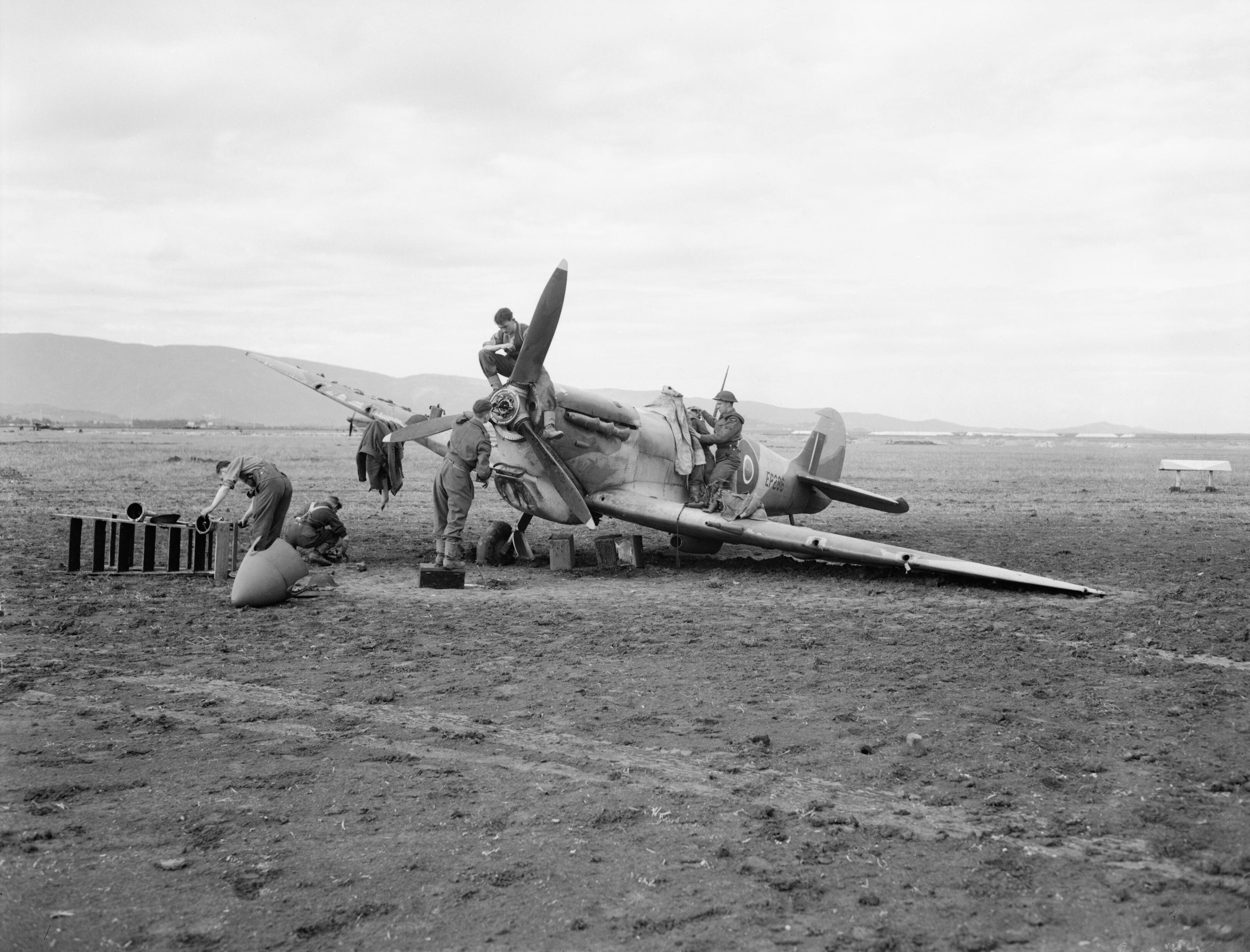
A Royal Air Force Spitfire that suffered landing gear failure upon landing near Bône, Algeria

Commodore Thomas Hope Troubridge, RN

Escort carriers HMS Biter and HMS Dasher
Light cruisers HMS Jamaica and HMS Aurora
Anti-aircraft cruiser HMS Delhi
Headquarters ship HMS Largs
1 anti-aircraft ship
13 Destroyers
4 sloops
6 Corvettes
8 mine hunters
8 Trawlers
2 Submarines
19 Landing ships
28 Transport ships

US II Corps

Major General Lloyd R. Fredendall, USA

Approx. 39,000 officers and enlisted

1st Infantry "Big Red One" Division (Maj. Gen. Terry Allen)

16th Infantry Regiment
18th Infantry Regiment
26th Infantry Regiment

1st Armored Division (Maj. Gen. Orlando Ward)

Combat Command B
6th Armored Infantry Regiment

1st Ranger Battalion
2nd Battalion, 509th Parachute Infantry Regiment

=== Eastern Task Force – Algiers ===
Ground and naval commanders for Eastern Task Force

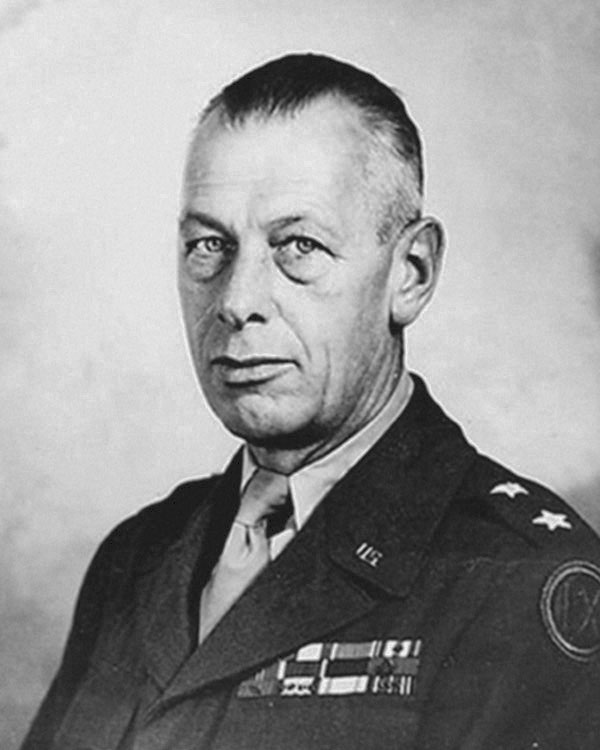
Maj. Gen. Charles W. Ryder, USA

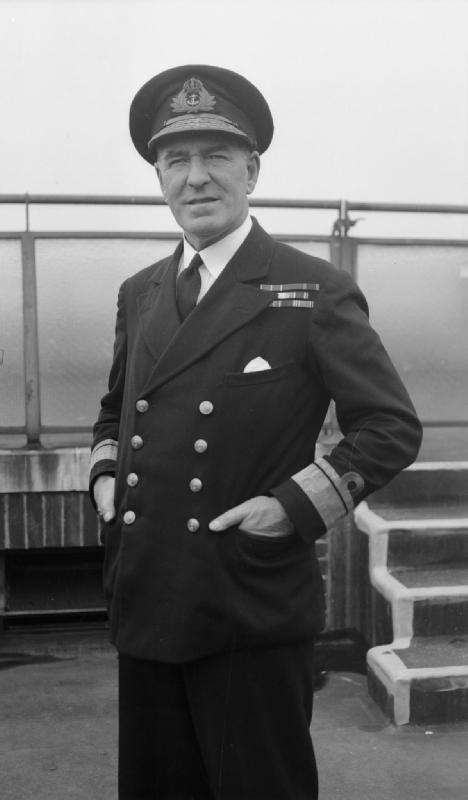
Rear Adm. Sir Harold M. Burrough, RN

Rear Admiral Sir Harold Burrough, RN

Aircraft carrier HMS Argus
Escort carrier HMS Avenger
Light cruisers HMS Sheffield, HMS Scylla and HMS Charybdis
Headquarters ship HMS Bulolo
Monitor HMS Roberts
3 anti-aircraft ships
13 Destroyers
3 Sloops
6 Corvettes
7 Mine hunters
8 Trawlers
3 Submarines
17 Landing ships
16 Transport ships

Allied Landing Forces

Major General Charles W. Ryder, USA (Note: CG, US 34th Infantry Division)

Approx. 33,000 officers and enlisted

(United Kingdom) British (approx. 23,000)

78th Infantry Division (Maj. Gen. Vyvyan Evelegh)

11th Infantry Brigade
36th Infantry Brigade

No. 1 Commando
No. 6 Commando
5 squadrons of RAF Regiment

United States (approx. 10,000)

9th Infantry Division (Maj. Gen. Manton S. Eddy)

39th Infantry Regiment

34th Infantry Division (Maj. Gen. Charles W. Ryder)

135th Infantry Regiment
168th Infantry Regiment

=== 19th Army Corps (French Army in Algeria) ===
Division	Regiments and others
Algiers Division Général de division Charles Mast	Infantry: 1st Zouave Regiment; 1st Algerian Tirailleurs Regiment; 5th Algerian Tirailleurs Regiment; 9th Algerian Tirailleurs Regiment; 29th Algerian Tirailleurs Regiment; 13th Senegalese Tirailleurs Regiment; Cavalry: 5th Chasseurs d'Afrique Regiment; 1st Algerian Spahi Regiment; Artillery: 65th Artillery Regiment of Africa; II/411th Artillery Regiment of Africa; Guard: III/7th Guard Regiment; Others: 1st Annamite Sappers
Constantine Division Général de division Édouard Welvert	Infantry: 3rd Algerian Tirailleurs Regiment; 7th Algerian Tirailleurs Regiment; 3rd Zouave Regiment; 15th Senegalese Tirailleurs Regiment; Cavalry: 3rd Chasseurs d'Afrique Regiment; 3rd Algerian Spahi Regiment; 6th Algerian Spahi Regiment; Artillery: 67th Artillery Regiment of Africa; Guard: 7th Guard Regiment
Oran Division Général de division Robert Boissau	Infantry: 2nd Zouave Regiment; 2nd Algerian Tirailleurs Regiment; 6th Algerian Tirailleurs Regiment; 16th Algerian Tirailleurs Regiment; 66th Algerian Tirailleurs Regiment; Cavalry: 2nd Algerian Spahi Regiment; 2nd Chasseurs d'Afrique Regiment; 9th Chasseurs d'Afrique Regiment; Artillery: 411th Artillery Regiment of Africa

== Bibliography ==
- Morison, Samuel Eliot (1947). Operations in North African Waters. History of United States Naval Operations in World War II. Vol. II. Boston: Little, Brown and Co. ISBN 0-7858-1303-9.
- Rohwer, J. (2005). Chronology of the War at Sea 1939–1945. Naval Institute Press. ISBN 978-1-59114-119-8.
