= David Buss (United States Navy) =

US Navy admiral (born 1956)

David H. Buss
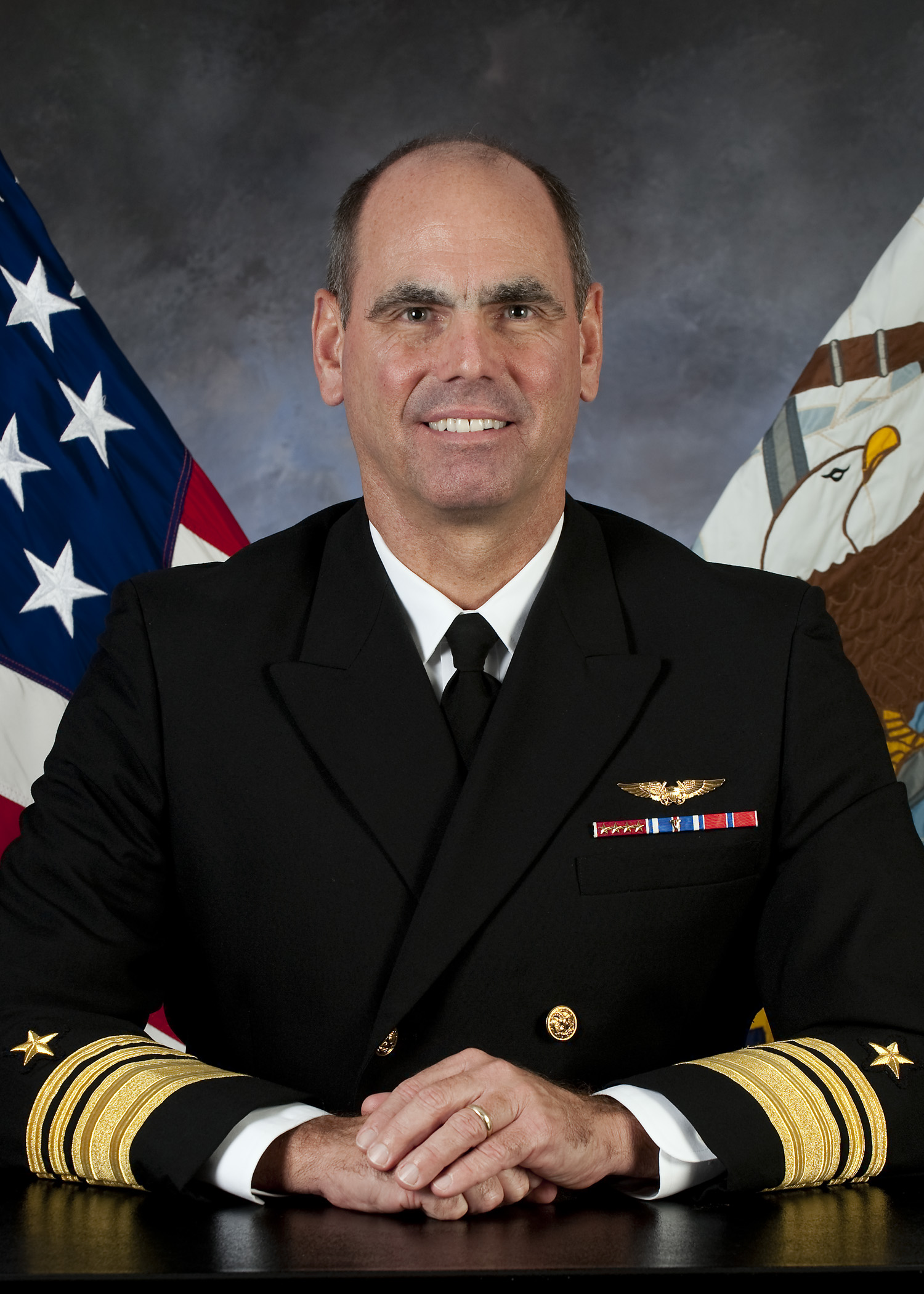
- Born: February 18, 1956 (age 70)
- Military career
- Allegiance: United States
- Branch: United States Navy
- Service years: 1978–2015
- Rank: Vice Admiral
- Commands: Naval Air Forces; Task Force 20; Carrier Strike Group 12; USS John C. Stennis; USS Sacramento (AOE-1); Attack Squadron 34
- Conflicts: Gulf War; Iraq War
- Awards: Navy Distinguished Service Medal; Legion of Merit (5); Distinguished Flying Cross; Bronze Star Medal

David H. Buss (born February 18, 1956) is a native of Lancaster, Pennsylvania and a retired vice admiral of the United States Navy. His last assignment was as Commander, Naval Air Forces and Commander, Naval Air Force, Pacific in San Diego, California, a position also known as the Navy's "Air Boss." Prior to taking command as the "Air Boss," Buss served as the Deputy Commander, United States Fleet Forces Command in Norfolk, Virginia. He also commanded Task Force 20 (formerly United States Second Fleet), where he was responsible for training and certifying all Atlantic Fleet naval forces for overseas deployment. A career Naval Flight Officer, Buss served in multiple jet squadrons and staff assignments, and has commanded at every level of the navy from commander to vice admiral.

Buss was succeeded as Commander, Naval Air Forces and Commander, Naval Air Force Pacific by Vice Admiral Mike Shoemaker in January 2015.

== Educational background ==
- United States Naval Academy, 1978, Bachelor of Science (Physics)
- United States Navy Nuclear Propulsion training, 1997
- University of North Carolina, Kenan-Flagler Business School, 2007 (Exec. Ed)

== Previous assignments ==
Buss commanded the A-6 Intruder squadron, Attack Squadron 34 (1995–96); the fast combat support ship USS Sacramento (AOE-1) (2000–01); the nuclear-powered aircraft carrier USS John C. Stennis (CVN-74) (2003–06); and Carrier Strike Group 12, the USS Enterprise Carrier Strike Group (2009–10).

Buss also served in Baghdad, Iraq (2008–09) as Director, Strategy/Plans/Assessments (J-5) for Multi-National Force Iraq (MNF-I) where he oversaw the planning effort for the initial troop draw down from the height of the 2007–08 surge.

== Awards and decorations ==
Buss is authorized to wear the following:

Badges
Naval Flight Officer insignia

U.S. military decorations
Navy Distinguished Service Medal with a gold award star
Legion of Merit with 4 gold award stars
Distinguished Flying Cross with Combat V
Bronze Star Medal
Defense Meritorious Service Medal
Meritorious Service Medal with a gold award star
Air Medal with Combat V, 3 individual gold stars and Strike/Flight numerals "4"
Navy and Marine Corps Commendation Medal with Combat V and four gold award stars
Navy and Marine Corps Achievement Medal
Navy Unit Commendation with a bronze service star
Navy Meritorious Unit Commendation
Navy "E" Ribbon (awarded three times)
Navy Expeditionary Medal
National Defense Service Medal with a bronze service star
Armed Forces Expeditionary Medal
Southwest Asia Service Medal with two bronze service stars
Iraq Campaign Medal with a bronze star
Global War on Terrorism Service Medal
Armed Forces Service Medal
Sea Service Ribbon with six bronze service stars
Non-U.S. service medals
NATO Medal
Foreign military decorations
Kuwait Liberation Medal (Saudi Arabia)
Kuwait Liberation Medal (Kuwait)
