= Task Force 80 =

Task Force 80 (TF-80)
- Active: 1 October 2012 – present
- Country: United States of America
- Branch: United States Navy
- Type: Task Force
- Role: Maritime Headquarters (MHQ)
- Part of: United States Fleet Forces Command
- Garrison/HQ: Naval Station Norfolk, Virginia

Commanders
- Director: Rear Admiral John D. Alexander, USN

Task Force 80, abbreviated as TF-80, has been the designation of several U.S. Navy task forces, with its current use associated with the United States Fleet Forces Command headquartered at Naval Station Norfolk, Virginia.

== Historical antecedents ==
Map of the Allied landings in Sicily code-named Operation Husky on 10 July 1943

During World War Two, Task Force 80 was the designation for the Western Naval Task Force, under the command of Vice Admiral Henry K. Hewitt, USN, during the Allied invasion of Sicily and the Salerno landings, the first sustained land assault and invasion of the European continent undertaken by the Allied powers. The Western Naval Task Force landed the U.S. Seventh Army under Lieutenant General George S. Patton, USA, on the southern coast of the island of Sicily on 10 July 1943. This task force subsequently landed the U.S. Fifth Army under Lieutenant General Mark W. Clark, USA, in southern Italy near the seaport of Salerno on 9 September 1943.

After World War Two, Task Force 80 was the designation for a 1948 joint Navy-Coast Guard task force consisting of the Wind-class icebreakers USCGC Edisto and USCGC Eastwind, as well as the Andromeda-class attack cargo ship USS Wyandot. This Task Force 80 resupplied weather stations at Thule, Greenland, and on Ellesmere Island while establishing a new weather station on the northern point of that island. Additionally, the ships performed reconnaissance for the establishment of additional weather stations, carried out cold-weather operations, tested equipment, and collected a variety of scientific data.

Finally, Task Force 80 was the designation for the Naval Patrol and Protection of Shipping Force of the U.S. Atlantic Fleet during the Cold War and thereafter. This TF-80's mission was the coordination of U.S. naval forces in order to protect merchant shipping if war with the Soviet Union & allies had broken out; a possible third Battle of the Atlantic.

== U.S. Navy usage from 2012 ==
Following the issue of the Navigation Plan 2013–2017 guidance from the Chief of Naval Operations, U.S. Fleet Forces Command was realigned to a command structure centered around a Maritime Operations Center and Maritime Headquarters.

The Maritime Operations Center is the lead agency for all phases of the pre-deployment fleet response training plan (FRTP) cycle involving those naval units assigned to the Fleet Forces Command. In essence, the MOC is responsible for the transition of all naval units from their operational phase to their tactical phase prior to their overseas deployment.

Consequently, effective 1 October 2012, Task Force 20 was re-designated as Task Force 80, a major task force within the U.S. Fleet Forces Command. TF-80 serves as the designation for the Maritime Headquarters (MHQ) component for Fleet Forces Command, and it is organized into the following task groups. They are:

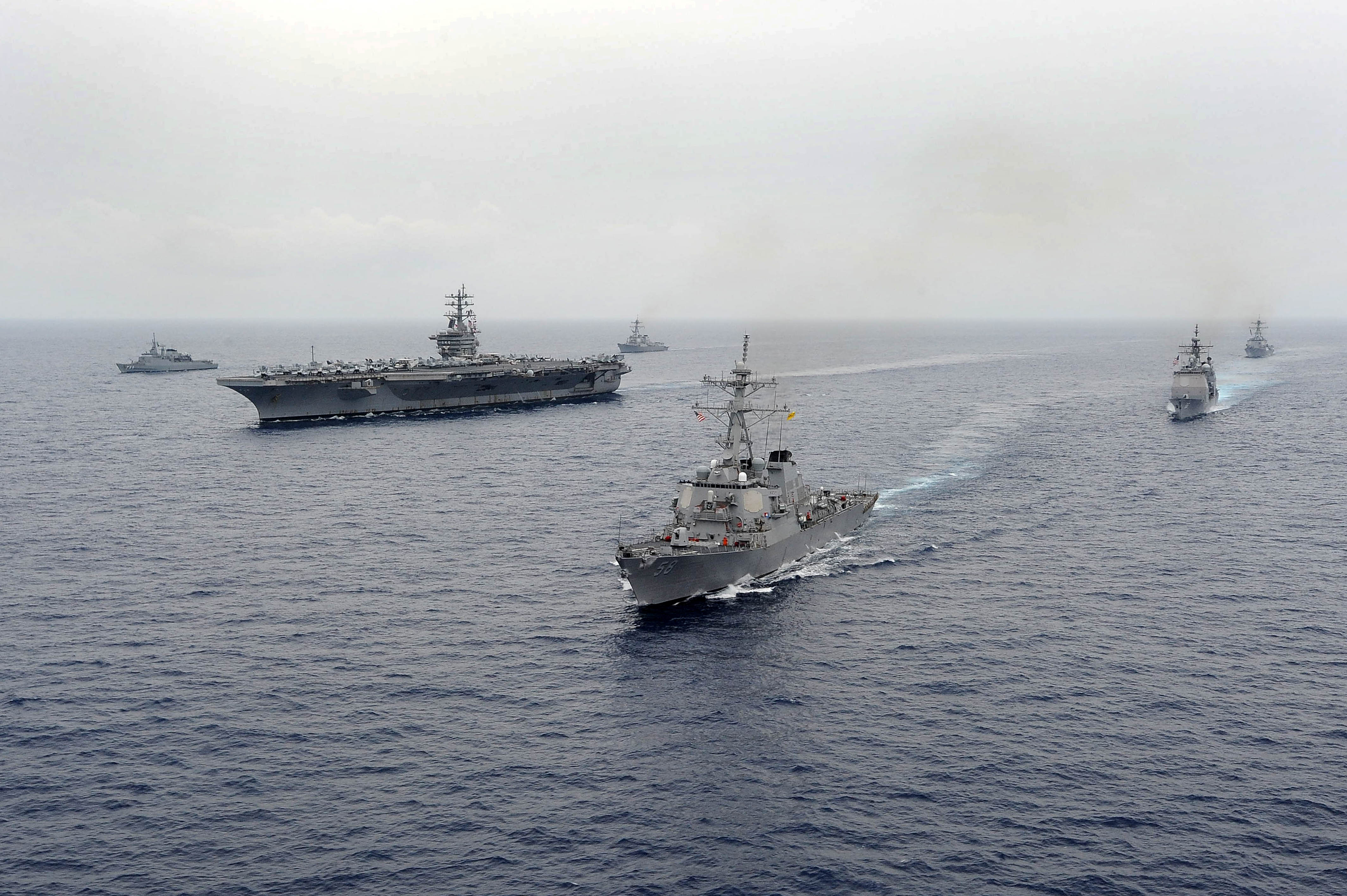
Ships of Carrier Strike Group Eight underway in the Atlantic Ocean during its pre-deployment composite training unit exercise (16 May 2012)

- Task Group 80.1 — Carrier Strike Group 4
- Task Group 80.2 — Carrier Strike Group 2
- Task Group 80.3 — Carrier Strike Group 8 (pictured)
- Task Group 80.4 — Carrier Strike Group 10
- Task Group 80.5 — Carrier Strike Group 12
- Task Group 80.6 — Navy Expeditionary Combat Command
- Task Group 80.7 — Naval Meteorology and Oceanography Command
- Task Group 80.8 — Destroyer Squadron 14 (now Naval Surface Squadron 14)
- Task Group 80.9 — Expeditionary Strike Group 2
- Task Group 80.11 — Naval Air Force Atlantic
- Task Group 80.12 — Reconnaissance – Commander Patrol and Reconnaissance Group
- Task Group 80.14 — Explosive Ordnance Disposal Group Two
- Task Group 80.15 — Coastal Riverine Group Two

The commander of Task Force 80 is the director of the Maritime Headquarters staff, an active-duty two-star rear admiral. When constituted as a joint task force for multi-service operations with the U.S. Northern Command, Task Force 80 will be re-designated as Task Force 180. TF-180's objective is to execute the Maritime Command Element (MCE) functions based on the U.S. eastern seaboard as directed by Joint Forces Maritime Component Commander North (JFMCC-N) who is also the Fleet Forces commander. Task Force 180 is supported in this task by applicable capabilities and assets provided from Fleet Operations Task Forces of the U.S. Fleet Forces Command when these fleet formations are acting as joint task forces.

By July 2015, Commander, Commander, Naval Meteorology and Oceanography Command had become Task Force 80.7.

== Philippine Navy usage in the twenty-first century ==
Naval Task Force 80 is the rapid deployment force for the Philippine Navy, with the capability to meet any contingencies throughout the Philippine archipelago.
