= 1st Moroccan Infantry Division =

1st Moroccan Infantry Division may refer to:

- 1st Moroccan Division (1939)
- Moroccan Division (France)
