= 1st Algerian Spahi Regiment =

French Army cavalry regiment

- 1er régiment de spahis algériens
- Badge of the 1st Algerian Spahi Regiment
- Active: 1834–1964
- Country: France
- Branch: French Army
- Type: Regiment of spahis
- Role: Cavalry
- Part of: Army of Africa (France)
- Garrison/HQ: Médéa after 1946
- Mottos: Entreprends sans crainte et tu réussiras Undertake without fear and you will succeed
- Engagements: French conquest of Algeria; Tunisian campaign; Battle of Isly; Siege of Zaatcha; Sino-French War; Tonkin campaign; Pacification of Morocco; First World War; Western Front; Sinai and Palestine campaign; Second World War; Battle of France; Battle of Alsace; Western Allied invasion of Germany; Algerian War
- Decorations: Croix de guerre 1939–1945
- Battle honours: Taguin 1843; Isly 1844; Tedjenna 1845; Temda 1845; Zaatcha 1849; Extrême-Orient 1884–1885; Maroc 1907–1913; L'Aisne 1915; Artois 1914–1915; Ousseltia 1943; AFN 1952–1962

Commanders
- Notable commanders: Joseph(Yusuf) Vantini; Eugène Daumas; Mohamed Ben Daoud; Colonel Olivier Marc

The 1st Algerian Spahi Regiment (French: 1er régiment de spahis algériens, abbreviated 1er RSA) was a cavalry regiment of the French Army. It was the first of the spahi regiments employed by the Army of Africa. It served in the French colonial campaigns in Africa and the Far East, in the First World War, the Second World War and the Algerian War. The regiment was disbanded in 1964.

== Creation and different names ==
- 1834: creation of the Corps of Regular Spahis of Algiers.
- 31 August 1839: disbanded.
- 1841: creation of the single Corps of Regular Spahis.
- 1845: the regular spahis of the Algiers region formed the 1st Spahi Regiment.
- 1921: renamed the 1st Algerian Spahi Regiment, or 1er RSA.
- 1939: elements of the regiment were dispersed into two reconnaissance groups.
- 1942: creation of the 1st Marching Algerian Spahi Regiment, or 1er RSAM.
- 1943: became the 1st Algerian Spahi Reconnaissance Regiment, or 1er RSAR.
- 1946: the 1er RSAR was disbanded and became the 1st African Chasseur Regiment.
- 1946: recreation of the 1st Algerian Spahi Regiment by renaming the 5th Algerian Spahi Regiment.
- 1958: renamed the 1st Spahi Regiment.
- 1964: disbanded by being renamed the 9th Hussar Regiment.

== Commanding officers ==
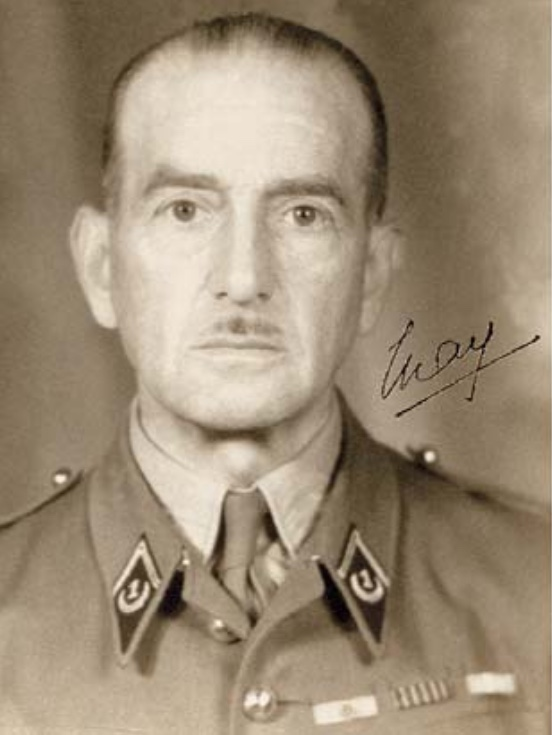
Colonel Olivier Marc, around 1936–1939.

- 1834–1839: Colonel Marey
- 1842–1845: Colonel Yusuf
- 1845–1850: Colonel Eugène Daumas
- 1850–1855: Colonel Lauër
- 1855–1859: Colonel Gustave Hyacinthe Law de Lauriston
- 1859–1870: Colonel Louis Alexandre Désiré Abdelal
- 1870–1871: Colonel Létuvé
- 1871–1873: Colonel Goursaud
- 1873–1876: Colonel Reboul
- 1876–1880: Colonel Collignon
- 1880–1884: Colonel Canard
- 1884–1889: Colonel Béchade
- 1889–1890: Colonel Mohamed Ben Daoud
- 1890–1891: Colonel Guérin d'Agon
- 1891–1894: Colonel Gravier de Vergennes
- 1894–1899: Colonel Lagarde
- 1899–unknown: Colonel de Fry
- 1935–1940: Colonel Olivier Marc
- 1939 or 1940: Colonel d'Allonville
- 1942–1944: Colonel Hennoque
- 1944–1945: Colonel Bonvalot
- 1945–1948: Colonel Lebel
- 1948–unknown: Colonel Borghetti
- 1952–1954: Colonel Chapard
- 1954–1956: Lieutenant-Colonel Ceccaldi
- 1956–1957: Lieutenant-Colonel Julien
- 1957–1959: Lieutenant-Colonel Richard
- 1959–1960: Lieutenant-Colonel Pavillon
- 1960–1962: Lieutenant-Colonel Biosse-Duplan
- 1962–1963: Lieutenant-Colonel Bigot
- 1963–1964: Lieutenant-Colonel Poumarède

== History ==
=== 1834 to 1870 ===
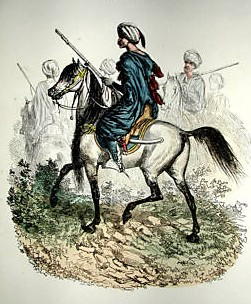
Armand-Octave-Marie d'Allonville commanded the Moorish gendarmes, who in 1841 wore oriental-style uniforms similar to those of the spahis.

The unit was created on 10 September 1834 with 214 cavalrymen from the 1st African Chasseur Regiment in French Algeria.

The 1st Spahi Regiment was created at Blida in October 1845, under the royal ordinance of 21 July 1845, by grouping together the spahi squadrons stationed in the Algiers region. These squadrons had taken part in the Battle of Taguin, also known as the Battle of the Smala, in 1843 and in the Battle of Isly in 1844. Operating in the Djebel Amour in 1846, the regiment received its first standard in 1848.

The regiment took part in the Siege of Zaatcha in 1849. On 3 October 1849, Brigadier Abdelkader Ben Kassem captured the standard of Sidi el-Djoudi, a leader of the Zouaoua.

In 1854, the three Algerian spahi regiments, the 1st, 2nd and 3rd, detached volunteers to serve in the Crimean War. In 1870, the same three regiments detached platoons to form a marching squadron of Algerian spahis and a regiment of Algerian scouts, which fought in the Franco-Prussian War. They returned to Algeria on 15 March.

=== 1870 to 1914 ===
The 3rd Squadron fought in Tonkin from 1885 to 1889 as part of the Tonkin cavalry marching regiment. A detachment of the 1st Spahis was sent to the Kingdom of Dahomey in 1892.

From 1907, the regiment served in Morocco during the operations of so-called pacification. It was later sent to France during the First World War.

=== First World War ===
The squadrons of the 1st Algerian Spahi Regiment fought on the Western Front in France, in Morocco and on the Palestine front alongside the British Empire against the Ottoman Empire.

=== Interwar period ===
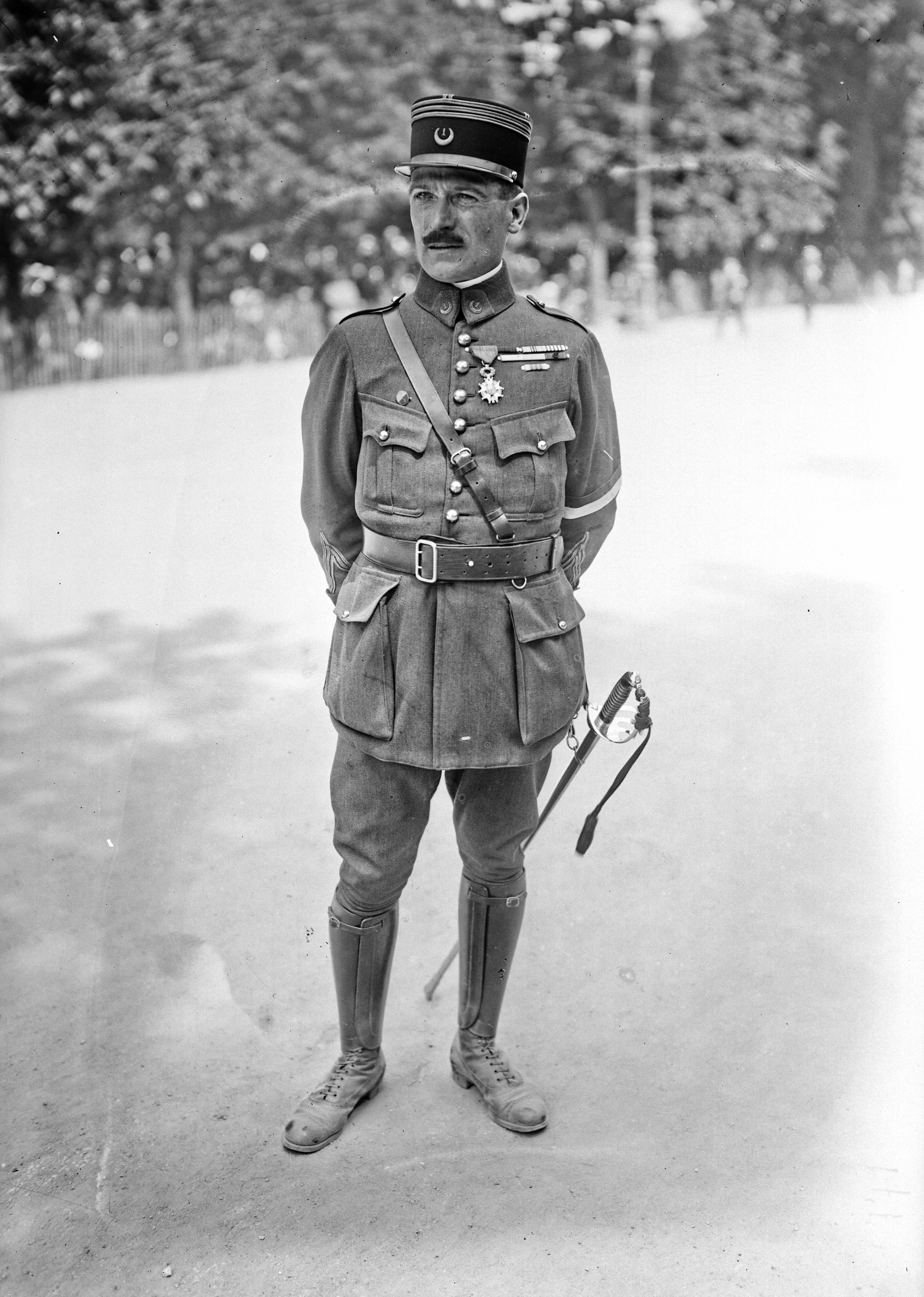
A captain of the 1st Algerian Spahi Regiment in 1921.

In 1925 and 1926, the regiment served in the Levant.

=== Second World War ===
==== 1939 ====
The cavalry grouping was intended, on mobilisation, to form reconnaissance groups. When war was declared in 1939, the 1st Algerian Spahi Regiment disappeared as a unit and was divided to create two reconnaissance groups:

- 81st Infantry Division Reconnaissance Group
- 85th Infantry Division Reconnaissance Group

==== 1942 ====
The 1st Algerian Spahi Regiment was re-formed in Algeria in 1942. It consisted of a headquarters, a non-rank squadron and three squadron groups.

Its headquarters included:

- Commanding officer: Colonel Hennoque
- Second-in-command: Commandant Sabarots
- Intelligence: Captain de Montille
- Signals: Lieutenant Grondale
- 37 mm teams: Lieutenant Varnier
- Motor transport service: Lieutenant Teule
- Medical service: Captain Maurin
- Veterinary service: Captain Pasquini

The non-rank squadron was commanded by Captain Bonnafont.

The 1st Squadron Group was commanded by Commandant Jeunechamp and included:

- 1st Squadron: Captain de Carne
- 2nd Squadron: Lieutenant de Pontcharra

The 2nd Squadron Group was commanded by Commandant Micciolo and included:

- Assistant: Lieutenant Camus
- 3rd Squadron: Captain Langlois
- 4th Squadron: Captain Galan

The 3rd Squadron Group was commanded by Captain Barbier Sainte Marie and included:

- Assistant: Lieutenant Krieger
- 5th Squadron: Captain d'Achon
- 6th Squadron: Lieutenant Bérard

==== 1943 ====
During the Tunisian campaign in 1943, the 1st Algerian Spahi Regiment was part of the Algiers March Division. It distinguished itself at Kranguet Ouchtatia on 13 January 1943 and at Ousseltia from 20 to 22 January 1943.

==== 1944 ====
The regiment landed in France in October 1944 as part of the reserve of the French First Army. It was committed during the Battle of Alsace and took part in the breakthrough of the Belfort Gap.

==== 1945 ====
The regiment then crossed the Rhine and continued the advance into Germany during the Western Allied invasion of Germany. It received a citation at army level during the German campaign.

=== After 1945 ===
The regiment was recreated in 1946 by the transformation of the 5th Algerian Spahi Regiment and was garrisoned at Médéa. From July to October 1954, two squadrons were detached to Tunisia, and in 1955 one squadron was detached to Morocco. The regiment then took part in operations during the Algerian War.

In April 1963, the regiment was stationed at Constantine in Gallifet barracks. It moved to Orléansville in May 1963 and then to Fort de l'Eau at Camp Lido at the end of 1963. It left Algeria from the military port of Algiers in mid-June 1964 and sailed for France, where it was sent to Provins and Coulommiers.

The spahis of the province of Algiers, including those of the 1st Algerian Spahi Regiment, wore a red tombo on their burnous and boleros.

== Traditions ==
=== Uniform ===
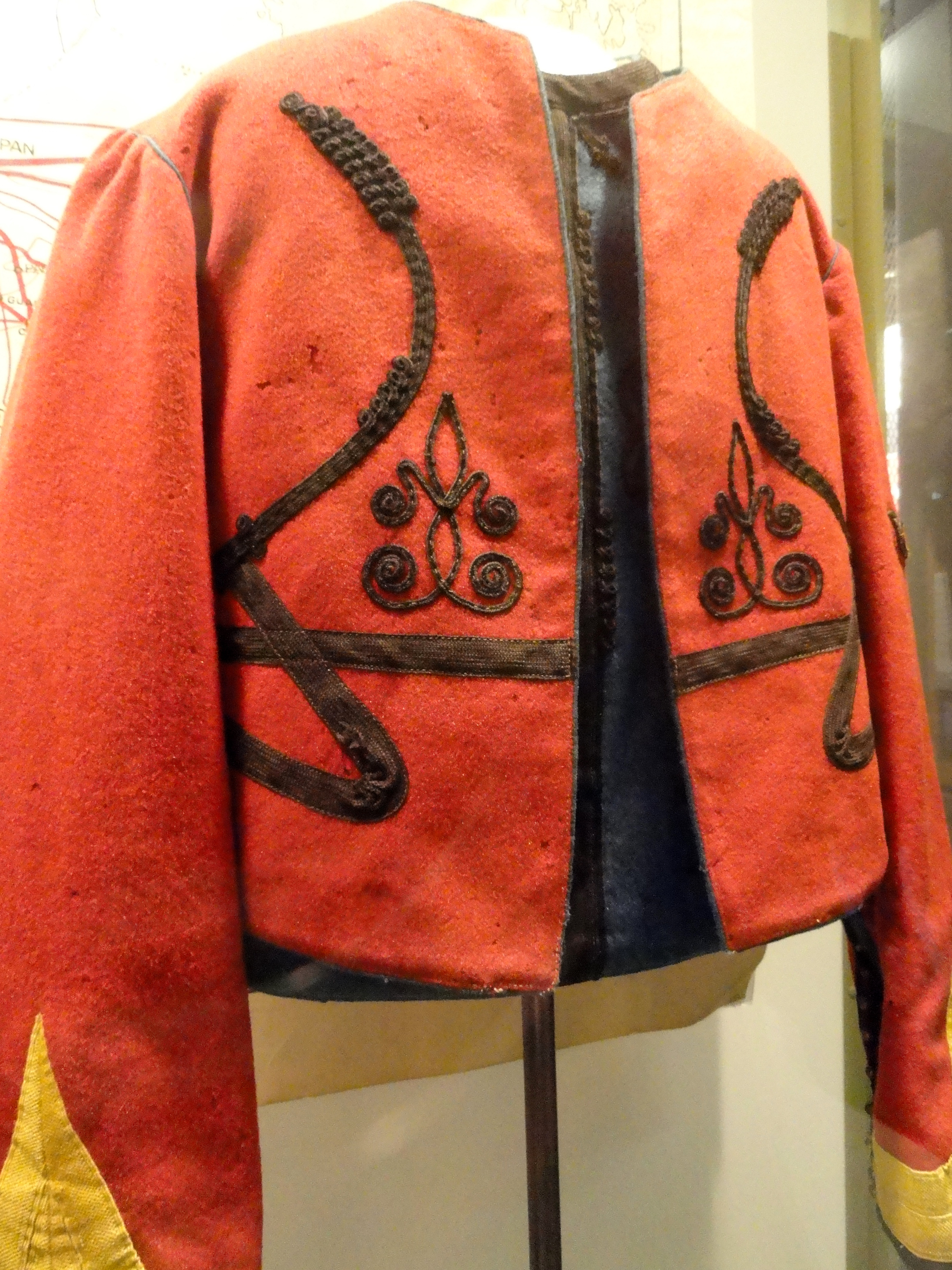
Bolero of the 1st Algerian Spahi Regiment, with the red tombo, the distinctive colour of the spahis of the Algiers province.

=== Badge ===
The badge of the 1st Algerian Spahi Regiment was created in 1938 under the command of Colonel Olivier Marc. It underwent only minor changes during the history of the regiment. It consisted of three elements: a lozenge representing the regiment's collar patch, a crescent moon and the hand of Fatima. From 1951 to 1956, the badge was placed inside a cogwheel, symbolising the mechanisation of the regiment.

=== Motto ===
The motto of the regiment was:

Entreprends sans crainte et tu réussiras

In English:

Undertake without fear and you will succeed.

=== Regimental standard ===
The standard of the regiment bore, sewn in gold letters in its folds, the following battle honours:

- Taguin 1843
- Isly 1844
- Tedjenna 1845
- Temda 1845
- Zaatcha 1849
- Extrême-Orient 1884–1885
- Maroc 1907–1913
- L'Aisne 1915
- Artois 1914–1915
- Ousseltia 1943
- AFN 1952–1962

The tie of the standard was decorated with the Fourragère in the colours of the ribbon of the Croix de guerre 1914–1918, awarded on 4 January 1919, and with the Croix de guerre 1939–1945, with one palm and one vermeil star.

== Notable personnel ==
- François Charles du Barail, French Minister of War, served in the 1st Spahis in 1853–1854
- Antoine Beaudemoulin, general, lieutenant in the regiment in 1883
- Mohamed Ben Daoud, Algerian-born officer, colonel of the 1st Spahis in 1889
- Rémy Raffalli, killed in the First Indochina War, served in the 1st Algerian Spahi Regiment in 1936
- Jacques Fitamant, French Resistance member and Companion of the Liberation

== See also ==
- Spahi
- Army of Africa (France)
- 1st Spahi Regiment
- French cavalry during World War I
