= Task Force 20 =

US military unit designation (1946–2012)

Task Force 20 (TF-20)
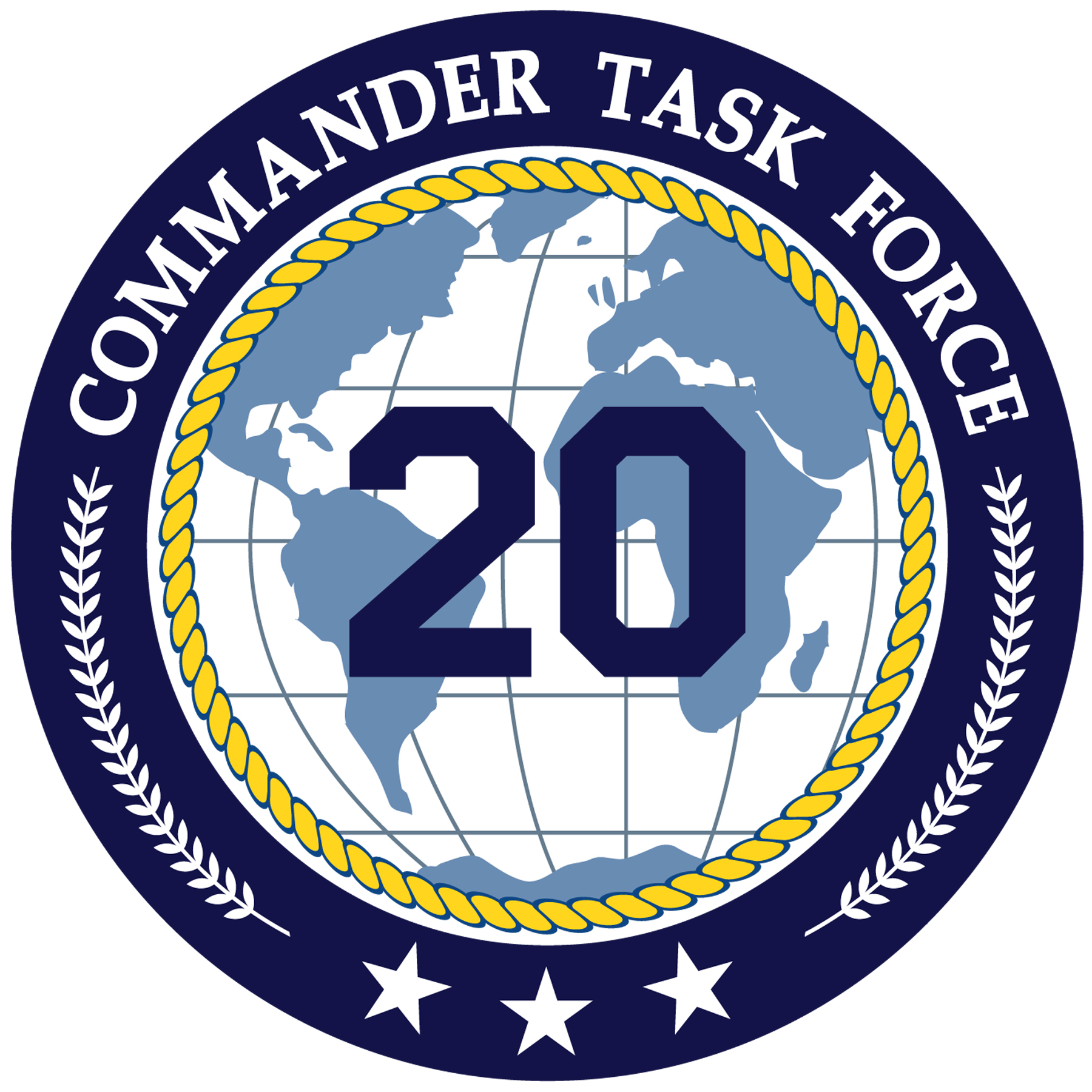
- CTF-20 insignia
- Active: 1946–2012
- Allegiance: United States
- Branch: United States Navy
- Type: Task Force
- Role: Battle Force
- Part of: United States Second Fleet
- Garrison/HQ: Naval Station Norfolk, Virginia

Task Force 20 was a temporary combat force designation that has been used several times by separate parts of the United States armed forces. The longer-established iteration was a part of the United States Second Fleet in the Atlantic from after the Second World War. This was part of the formal United States Military Communications-Electronic Board system.

The other iteration was a much more temporary task force of the Joint Special Operations Command, one of the designations used by the JSOC high value targets task force which began its life as Task Force 11 (also doubling a U.S. Navy designation) after the September 11 terrorist attacks.

== United States Navy ==
Task Force 20 was a task force for the now-deactivated United States Second Fleet, as well as a now-inactive task force for the United States Fleet Forces Command. In its Second Fleet role, TF-20 served as that fleet's Battle Force. In its subsequent role in the Fleet Forces Command, TF-20 served in a training role for U.S. naval units preparing to deploy to the United States Sixth Fleet in the East Atlantic Ocean and Mediterranean Sea, as well as the United States Fifth Fleet in the Indian Ocean and the Persian Gulf.

Task Force 20 was one of the task force designators assigned to the United States Fleet Forces Command in the Atlantic, and was previously one of the task force designators assigned to the United States Second Fleet. According to Norman Polmar, writing in Ships and Aircraft of the U.S. Fleet, the designator was reserved for the Second Fleet's Battle Force, and the commander of that force was to be Commander, Second Fleet. This was the documented case from 1978 to 1987, and from probably much earlier. The task force was probably intended primarily at that time to undertake attacks on Soviet Navy bases on the Kola Peninsula in the event of a general war.

From 21 to 27 November 1946, USS Missouri was en route to Davis Strait as part of Task Group 20.2, which also included the cruiser Little Rock and destroyer USS Fechteler. Between 27 November and 4 December, she participated in cold-weather exercises in Davis Strait, between Greenland and East Baffin Island, as part of Task Group 20.2. An incident during that cruise involving the USS Little Rock. She was off the port side firing 5-inch star shells for illumination, to spot icebergs, when there was a misfire. According to standard procedure the gunner began to point the barrel toward the water to wait out a hangfire. However, the round cooked off halfway down. The round hit the Missouri on the signal bridge, killing Coxswain Robert Fountain and starting a fire involving an acetylene tank which was lashed to the railing. One or two officers' cabins were destroyed as well. Missouri did not get back to Norfolk until 13 December 1946. Commander Carrier Group 6 served as CTG 20.2 for a Mediterranean deployment aboard USS America (CV-66) in April 1984.

In late October 1983, USS Independence's battle group (Carrier Group Four), assigned to the Second Fleet, became the core of Task Group 20.5, the carrier task group that would support the Invasion of Grenada. On 25 October 1983, aircraft from Independence's embarked air wing flew missions supporting the invasion.

The post of Commander, Task Force 20, which was an additional post for the fleet's commander during the fleet's existence, has been maintained as a three-star vice admiral's position who also concurrently serves as the deputy commander of Fleet & Joint Operations, the deputy commander of U.S. Fleet Forces Command and the director of Combined Joint Operations From The Sea, Centre of Excellence. Task Force 20 was commanded by Vice Admiral David H. Buss) from 30 September 2011 until its disestablishment on 24 August 2012.

In effect, the tasks of the Second Fleet commander and staff were reassigned to Commander, Task Force 20 until Fleet Forces Command was reorganized on 14 September 2012. The Commander, Fleet Forces Command said on his blog that "It was for these reasons that I approved the establishment of two DCOM billets, the 3-Star DCOM for Fleet and Joint Operations (DCOM-FJO) and the 2-Star DCOM for Fleet Management/Chief of Staff (DCOM-FM/COS). These two individuals will report directly to me for their respective portfolios. Recognizing the significant increase in direct report subordinate commands, I will also dual-hat the DCOM-FJO as Commander, Task Force 20 (CTF 20), with delegated command responsibilities for SECOND Fleet's subordinate commands (Commander Strike Force Training Atlantic (CSFTL), 4 x CSG, ESG-2) and Second Fleet’s existing Task Forces and Task Groups."

Task Force 20 was disestablished effective 1 October 2012, and its functions transferred to Task Force 80.

== JSOC Task Force 20 ==
=== Invasion of Iraq ===
In preparation for the 2003 invasion of Iraq, Task Force 20 was formed based on Task Force 11/Sword during the 2001 invasion of Afghanistan and were assigned to western Iraq, the TF (Task Force) was led by Major General Dell Dailey. TF 20 was composed of mainly SOF units from Joint Special Operations Command: B squadron Delta Force and all 3 Battalions of the 75th Ranger Regiment; Able Co. 1–15 Inf. 3rd Infantry Division 3rd Brigade (Audie Murphy Battalion) were the first unit to assist in QRF and HVT for the TF 20 at BIAP and as 3rd ID's mission was to return home after completing the Invasion of Iraq. Then a battalion strength element of the 82nd Airborne Division, serving as a QRF and reinforcements; and a M142 HIMARS; later in the invasion M1A1 Abrams tanks from C Company, 2nd Battalion 70th Armor were attached to TF 20.

TF 20 was covertly based at Ar'Ar Air Base in Saudi Arabia; the commander of the Delta Force squadron Lieutenant colonel Pete Blaber wanted to deploy his operators out into western Iraq and conduct strikes against enemy concentrations, tying up enemy forces that could otherwise be sent to reinforce against the Army and Marine advance from the south, such operation would also effectively deceive the Iraqis as to the true intentions of the coalition forces and precisely where the main effort would be concentrated. However, Dailey wanted the Delta squadron to stay at Ar'Ar Air Base and only launch against suspected WMD sites and/or HVT, the disagreement was decided by General Tommy Franks who went with Blaber's plan. TF 20 was tasked with seizing airfields deep in Iraq and capturing HVTs along with providing long-range Special Reconnaissance; one of its primary pre-invasion targets was the planned seizure of Saddam International Airport in Baghdad, two full-scale rehearsals were carried out but the operation was never carried out and the airport was eventually captured by conventional units.

In the evening of 19 March 2003, Task Force 20, led by B squadron Delta Force (accompanied by several Air Force Special Tactics teams, a Delta intelligence and targeting cell, several military working dog teams and two Iraqi-American interpreters), was the first US SOF unit to enter western Iraq as part of the initial infiltration before the main invasion. They later assisted coalition SOF in the capture H-3 Air Base, Rangers were later flown in to garrison the base; unofficially, Task Force 20 had been in Iraq, along with British SOF Task Force 7 and 14, and the Australian SOF Task Force 64. Delta Force then proceeded to the Haditha Dam complex; it also conducted numerous deception operations to confuse the Iraqis as to the disposition of Coalition forces in the west.

On 24 March 2003, Delta Force recce operators drove through Iraqi lines around the Haditha Dam, marking targets for Coalition airstrikes, the subsequent bombings resulted in the destruction of a large number of Iraqi armoured vehicles and antiaircraft systems. Also that day, 3rd Battalion 75th Ranger Regiment conducted a combat drop onto H-1 Air Base, securing the site as a staging area for operations in western Iraq. Delta's reconnaissance of the dam indicated that a much larger force was needed to capture it, so C squadron Delta squadron was dispatched from Fort Bragg, with a further Ranger battalion, along with M1A1 Abrams tanks from C Company, 2nd Battalion 70th Armor (known as "Team Tank"). C-17s flew the company from Talil to H-1 Air Base and then to MSS (Mission Support Site) Grizzly – a desert strip established by Delta Force which was located between Haditha and Tikrit; C Squadron, Delta Force was flown directly to MSS Grizzly.

On 26 March 2003, the DEVGRU component in TF 20 supported by B company 2nd Battalion 75th Ranger Regiment conducted the raid Objective Beaver – a suspected chemical and biological weapons site at the al Qadisiyah reservoir, north of Haditha, they engaged numerous gunmen but there was no chemical or biological weapons at the site.

On 1 April 2003, DEVGRU along with Para Rescue Jumpers and Combat Controllers from the 24th Special Tactics Squadron and Rangers from 1st and 2nd battalion 75th Ranger Regiment and other forces took part in the rescue of PFC Jessica Lynch; also that day C squadron Delta Force and 3rd battalion 75th Ranger Regiment captured the Haditha Dam and held it for a further 5 days.

Delta units headed north from Haditha to conduct ambushes along the highway above Tikrit, tying up Iraqi forces in the region and attempting to capture fleeing high-value targets trying to escape to Syria, Team Tank convinced Iraqi generals that the coalition main effort might be coming from the west. On 2 April 2003, they were engaged by half a dozen armed technicals from the same anti-special forces Fedayeen that had previously fought Task Force 7. Two Delta operators were wounded and the squadron requested aero medical evacuation and close-air support as a company of truck-borne Iraqi reinforcements arrived to bolster the Fedayeen assault. Two MH-60K Blackhawks carrying a para jumper medical team and two MH-60L Black Hawk DAPs of the 160th SOAR responded and engaged the Iraqis, which allowed the Delta operators to move their casualties to an emergency HLZ, after which they were medevaced to H-1 Air Base, escorted by a pair of A-10As. However, Master sergeant George Fernandez died of his wounds. The DAPs stayed on station and continued to engage the Iraqis, destroying a truck carrying a mortar and several infantry squads, whilst Delta snipers killed Iraqi infantryman firing on the DAPs. A pair of A-10As arrived and dropped 500 lb airburst bombs within 20m of Delta positions and killed a large number of Iraqi infantry who had been gathering in a wadi. The DAPs spotted several Iraqi units and engaged them until they were dangerously low on fuel.

On 9 April 2003, the combined team seized an airfield near Tikrit during a night attack, one tank drove into a 40 ft deep hole and flipped, injuring one of the crew and disabling the tank, which was later destroyed by another tank to deny it to the enemy. By mid-April, Delta had advanced into Baghdad and "Team Tank" returned to its parent unit.

Throughout April, TF 20 continued to raid suspected WMD sites, sometimes only hours ahead of the official Army WMD SSE team as major combat operations were winding down TF 20 transitioned to hunting HVT former Ba'athists. On 19 April 2003, the TF captured HVTs Mohammed Abbas, the leader of the Palestinian Liberation Front (PLF) terrorist group. On 25 April, captured the Iraqi deputy Prime Minister Tariq Aziz. TF 20 also recovered a Mi-17 Hip helicopter for later use in covert operations.

=== Post invasion ===
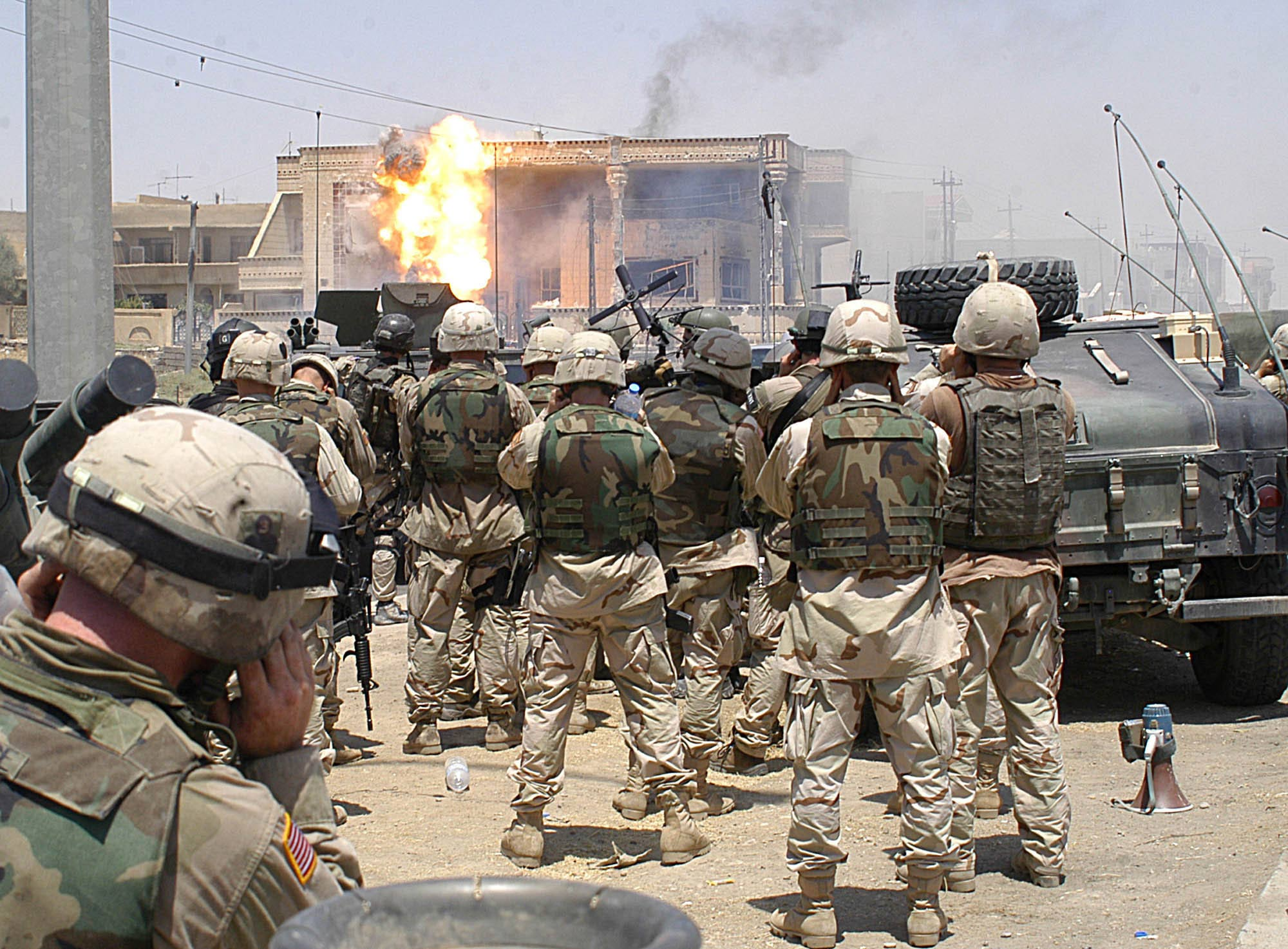
Delta Force Operators of Task Force 20 and 101st Airborne Division soldiers during the mission to capture/kill Uday and Qusay Hussein in Mosul, 22 July 2003.

in May 2003, 80% of SOF assets were rotated out of the theatre at the conclusion of major combat operations, elements of Task Force 20 remained and continued to hunting HVT former Ba'athists under direct JSOC command and had several successes in its early operations.

On 16 June 2003, operators from G Squadron, SAS (part of Task force 14) and B squadron, Delta Force, captured Lieutenant-General Abid Hamid Mahmud al-Tikriti, who had been Saddam Hussein's personal secretary and had been ranked the fourth most important HVT. He was captured in a joint helicopter and ground assault on a safehouse in Tikrit without resistance or casualties, in what was considered a highly successful operation.

On 18 June 2003, near the Syrian border, AC-130 Spectre gunships guided in by TF 20 operators destroyed a convoy of Ba'ath Party members escaping to Syria. Intelligence indicated that the convoy may have included Saddam Hussein and/or his sons; other reports claimed the convoy was composed of oil smugglers. Once the convoy was destroyed by the AC-130s, TF 20 conducted a heliborne assault into a nearby compound that proved to be a Ba'athist safehouse for ferrying FREs (Former Regime Elements) across the border. The operators then came under fire from Syrian border guards, leading to a firefight that left several of the border guards dead with 17 more captured who were immediately released.

On 22 July 2003, a former Ba'athist regime member used an informer to pass intelligence to the 101st Airborne Division that Uday and Qusay Hussein (who had $15 million bounty), along with Qusay's son and a bodyguard, were hiding in the informer's home in Mosul. The 101st passed this information to their divisional special forces liaison, who passed it on to TF 20. Platoons from the 101st Airborne set up an outer cordon around the target house; a Delta assault team prepared to breach and clear the building from the entrance, whilst a Delta interpreter called upon the occupants to surrender. The informer and his two sons left the building as previously agreed. Delta operators breached and entered, upon which they were immediately engaged by small arms fire, which wounded one Delta operator. As they withdrew from the house, the occupants threw grenades from the second floor on them, and several Delta operators were lightly wounded by the grenade fragments; the stairs had also been blocked to impede any rapid assault. Another group of assaulters fast-roped from a MH-6 Little Bird onto the roof of the building to examine the possibility of entering the building through the roof, but this wasn't possible. The decision was taken to soften up the target with heavy weapons before another entry. After soldiers of the 101st Airborne engaged the building with .50 cal HMGs and M136 anti tank rockets, a third entry attempt was made, but was again driven back by intense gunfire. The 101st fired 10 TOW missiles from HMMWV-mounted TOW II antitank guided missiles into the house, followed by repeated gun runs from OH-58 Kiowas firing 2.75 rockets and .50 cal machine guns. Delta subsequently made a successful entry and moved up onto the second floor, finding Qusay and the bodyguard dead. Qusay's son was hiding under a bed and opened fired on the operators, leaving them no choice but to kill him. Uday was discovered wounded and armed, a Delta operator shot and killed him.

== See also ==
- Task Force 80
