= Western Naval Task Force =

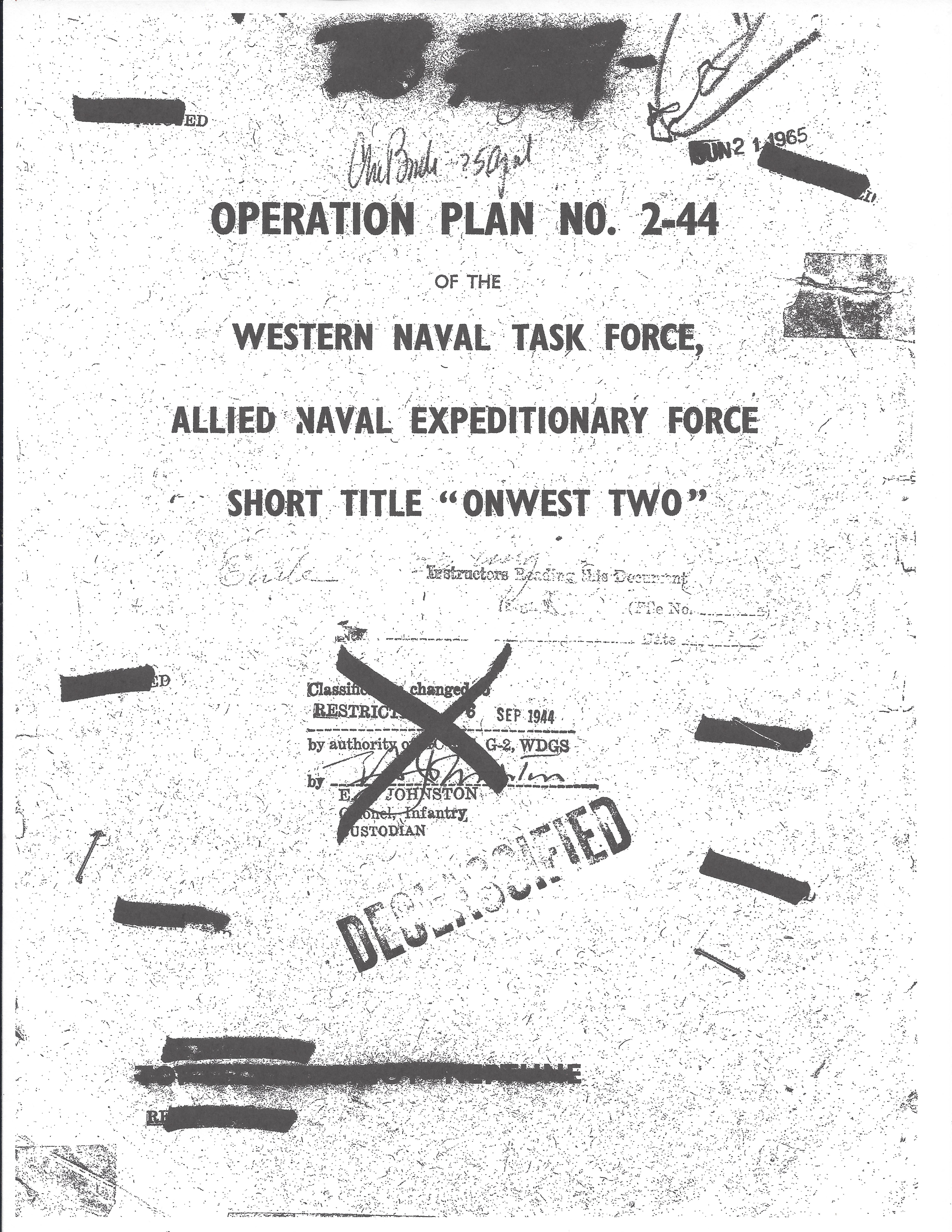
The title page of the operations plan for the Western Naval Task Force that formed part of the June 1944 invasion of Normandy

Western Naval Task Force was the name used for several groups of warships during amphibious landings in World War II:

- A force under Rear-Admiral Hewitt that landed US Army units during the Operation Torch, the Allied invasion of French North Africa in 1942
- A force under Rear-Admiral Hewitt that landed US Army units during the Allied invasion of Sicily in 1943
- A force under Admiral Hewitt that landed the US Fifth Army during the Allied invasion of Italy in 1943
- A force under Admiral Kirk that landed the US First Army during the invasion of Normandy in 1944
- A force under Admiral Hewitt that landed the US Army during the Operation Dragoon, the Allied invasion of Southern France in 1944.

== See also ==
- United States Eighth Fleet
- Operation Torch order of battle
- Operation Husky order of battle
- Allied invasion of Italy order of battle
- Operation Dragoon order of battle
