= United States Fleet Forces Command =

Service component command of the US Navy

United States Fleet Forces Command (USFFC)
- The seal of the Commander of United States Fleet Forces Command
- Founded: 1906; 120 years ago
- Allegiance: United States
- Branch: United States Navy
- Type: Force-providing command
- Part of: U.S. Northern Command
- Garrison/HQ: Naval Support Activity Hampton Roads, Norfolk, Virginia, U.S.
- Engagements: World War I World War II; Vietnam War; Global War on Terrorism
- Website: www.usff.navy.mil

Commanders
- Commander: ADM Karl O. Thomas
- Deputy Commander: Vacant
- Vice Commander: Vacant
- Fleet Master Chief: FLTCM Jason Haka

The United States Fleet Forces Command (USFFC or less commonly USFLTFORCOM) is a service component command of the United States Navy that provides naval forces to a wide variety of U.S. forces. The naval resources may be allocated to combatant commanders such as United States Northern Command (USNORTHCOM) under the authority of the secretary of defense. Originally formed as United States Atlantic Fleet (USLANTFLT) in 1906, it has been an integral part of the defense of the United States of America since the early 20th century. In 2002, the Fleet comprised over 118,000 Navy and Marine Corps personnel serving on 186 ships and in 1,300 aircraft, with an area of responsibility ranging over most of the Atlantic Ocean from the North Pole to the South Pole, the Caribbean Sea, Gulf of Mexico, and the waters of the Pacific Ocean along the coasts of Central and South America (as far west as the Galapagos Islands).

In 2006, the U.S. Atlantic Fleet was renamed to the United States Fleet Forces Command.

The command is based at Naval Support Activity Hampton Roads in Norfolk, Virginia, and is the Navy's service component to U.S. Northern Command and is the Joint Functional Maritime Component Command under the U.S. Strategic Command.

The command's mission is to organize, man, train, and equip naval forces for assignment to unified combatant command commanders; to deter, detect, and defend against homeland maritime threats; and to articulate Fleet warfighting and readiness requirements to the chief of naval operations.

== History ==
=== Expansion and contraction ===
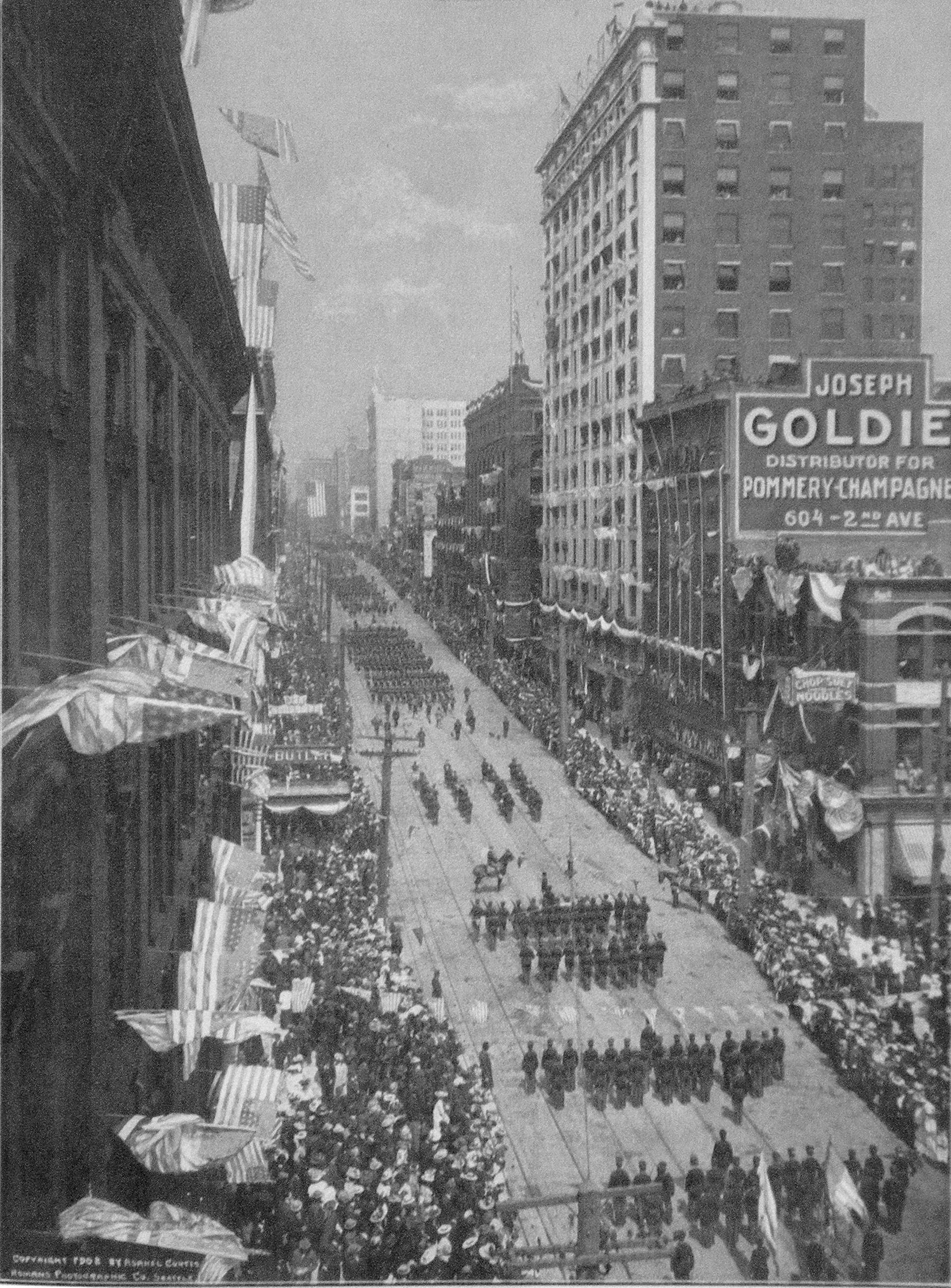
Atlantic Squadron parade Seattle, 1908

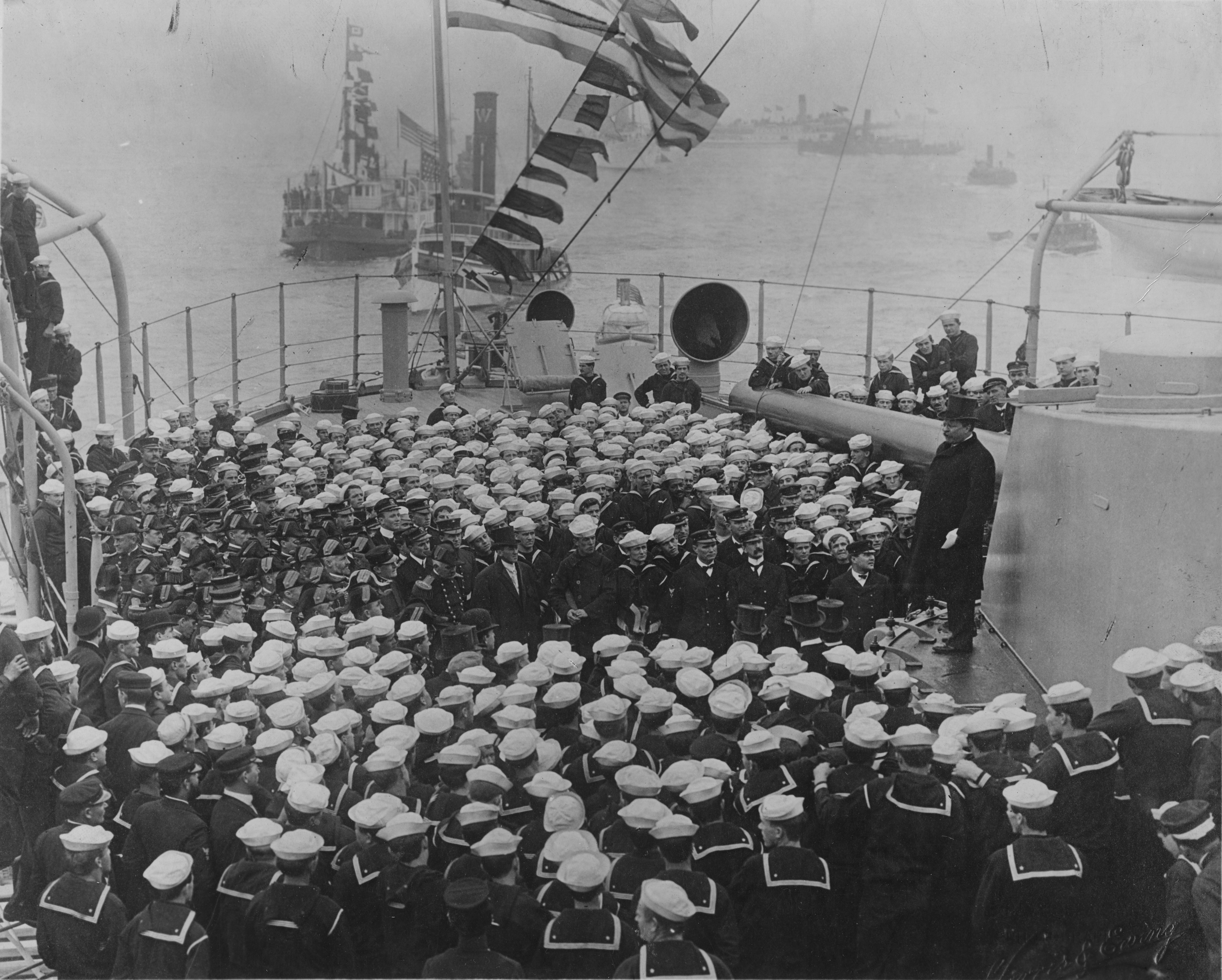
President Theodore Roosevelt addresses crewmen on Connecticut, upon her return from the Fleet's cruise around the world, 22 February 1909.

The Atlantic Fleet was established by President Theodore Roosevelt in 1906, at the same time as the Pacific Fleet, as protection for new bases in the Caribbean acquired as a result of the Spanish–American War. The Fleet was a combination of the North Atlantic Fleet and the South Atlantic Squadron.

The first commander of the fleet was Rear Admiral Robley D. Evans, who hoisted his flag in the battleship USS Maine (BB-10) on 1 January 1906. The following year, he took his 16 battleships, now dubbed the Great White Fleet, on a round-the-world cruise that lasted until 1909, a goodwill tour that also served the purpose of advertising the United States' naval strength and reach to all other nations of the globe.

In January 1913 the fleet consisted of six first-line divisions, a torpedo flotilla, submarines, and fleet auxiliaries. The fleet was under the command of Rear Admiral Hugo Osterhaus.

- The First Division, under Rear Admiral Bradley A. Fiske, consisted of USS Florida (BB-30) (flag), USS Delaware (BB-28), and USS North Dakota (BB-29).
- The Second Division, under Rear Admiral Nathaniel R. Usher with his flag aboard the USS Vermont (BB-20), consisted of USS Louisiana (BB-19), USS Michigan (BB-27), USS New Hampshire (BB-25), and USS South Carolina (BB-26).
- The Third Division, under Rear Admiral Cameron McR. Winslow, comprised USS Virginia (BB-13) (flag), USS Georgia (BB-15), USS New Jersey (BB-16), USS Rhode Island (BB-17), and USS Nebraska (BB-14).
- The Fourth Division, under Rear Admiral Frank F. Fletcher, consisted of the USS Minnesota (BB-22), USS Connecticut (BB-18), USS Ohio (BB-12), USS Idaho (BB-24), and USS Kansas (BB-21). (See United States occupation of Veracruz).
- Fifth and Sixth Divisions were made up of protected cruisers, USS St. Louis (C-20), USS Tennessee (ACR-10), USS Washington (ACR-11), and USS Cleveland (C-19), USS Denver (CL-16), USS Des Moines (CL-17), and USS Tacoma (CL-20).

The Cruiser and Transport Force, under Rear Admiral Albert Gleaves served in Atlantic waters during World War I moving the American Expeditionary Forces to Europe. United States Battleship Division Nine joined the Grand Fleet in the UK.

The Atlantic Fleet was reorganized into the Scouting Force in 1923, which was under the United States Fleet along with the Pacific Fleet. In January 1939 the Atlantic Squadron, United States Fleet, was formed, with Vice Admiral Alfred Wilkinson Johnson commanded. The aircraft carrier USS Ranger (CV-4) was transferred to the Atlantic Ocean, to join three battleships.

On 1 November 1940 the Atlantic Squadron was renamed the Patrol Force. The Patrol Force was organized into type commands: Battleships, Patrol Force; Cruisers, Patrol Force; Destroyers, Patrol Force; and, Train, Patrol Force (the logistics arms).

=== World War II ===
On 1 February 1941, the Atlantic Fleet was resurrected and organized from the Patrol Force. Along with the Pacific Fleet and Asiatic Fleet, the fleet was to be under the command of a full admiral, which jumped the fleet's commander Ernest J. King from a two-star to a four-star. King's flagship was USS Texas (BB-35).

Subsequently, the headquarters was in a rather odd assortment of ships; the USS Augusta (CA-31), then the old wooden ship USS Constellation, USS Vixen (PG-53), and then USS Pocono (AGC-16). In 1948, the HQ moved into the former naval hospital at Norfolk, Virginia, and has remained there ever since.

In July 1942, eight months after the United States entered the war, the Commander-in-Chief of the Royal Navy's America and West Indies Station based at Admiralty House, Bermuda had his title changed to Senior British Naval Officer, Western Atlantic. USS Augusta visited Bermuda in September, 1941.

==== Composition of the Atlantic Fleet in December 1941 ====
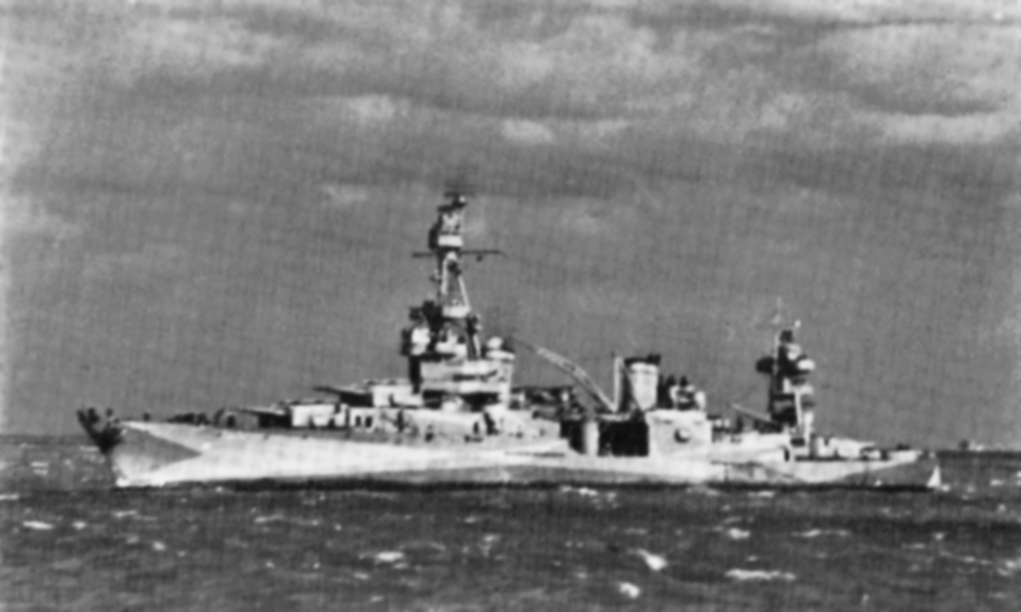
USS Augusta

On 7 December 1941 the Fleet comprised a number of separate components:

- United States Atlantic Fleet - Commander: Admiral Ernest J. King (Flagship: USS Augusta)
  - Battleships, Atlantic Fleet (made up of three Battleship Divisions) - Commander: Rear Admiral David M. LeBreton (Flagship: USS New York)
  - Aircraft, Atlantic Fleet (made up of one Carrier Division) - Commander: Rear Admiral Arthur B. Cook (Flagship: USS Yorktown)
  - Cruisers, Atlantic Fleet (made up of four Cruiser Divisions) - Commander: Rear Admiral H. Kent Hewitt (Flagship: USS Philadelphia)
  - Destroyers, Atlantic Fleet (made up of three Destroyer Flotillas) - Commander: Rear Admiral Ferdinand L. Reichmuth (Flagship: USS Denebola)
  - Patrol Wings, Atlantic Fleet (made up of five Patrol Wings) - Commander: Rear Admiral Ernest McWhorter (Flagship: USS Clemson)
  - Submarines, Atlantic Fleet (made up of four Submarine Squadrons) - Commander: Rear Admiral Richard S. Edwards (Flagship: USS Vixen)

§ = Divisional flagship

===== Battleships, Atlantic Fleet =====
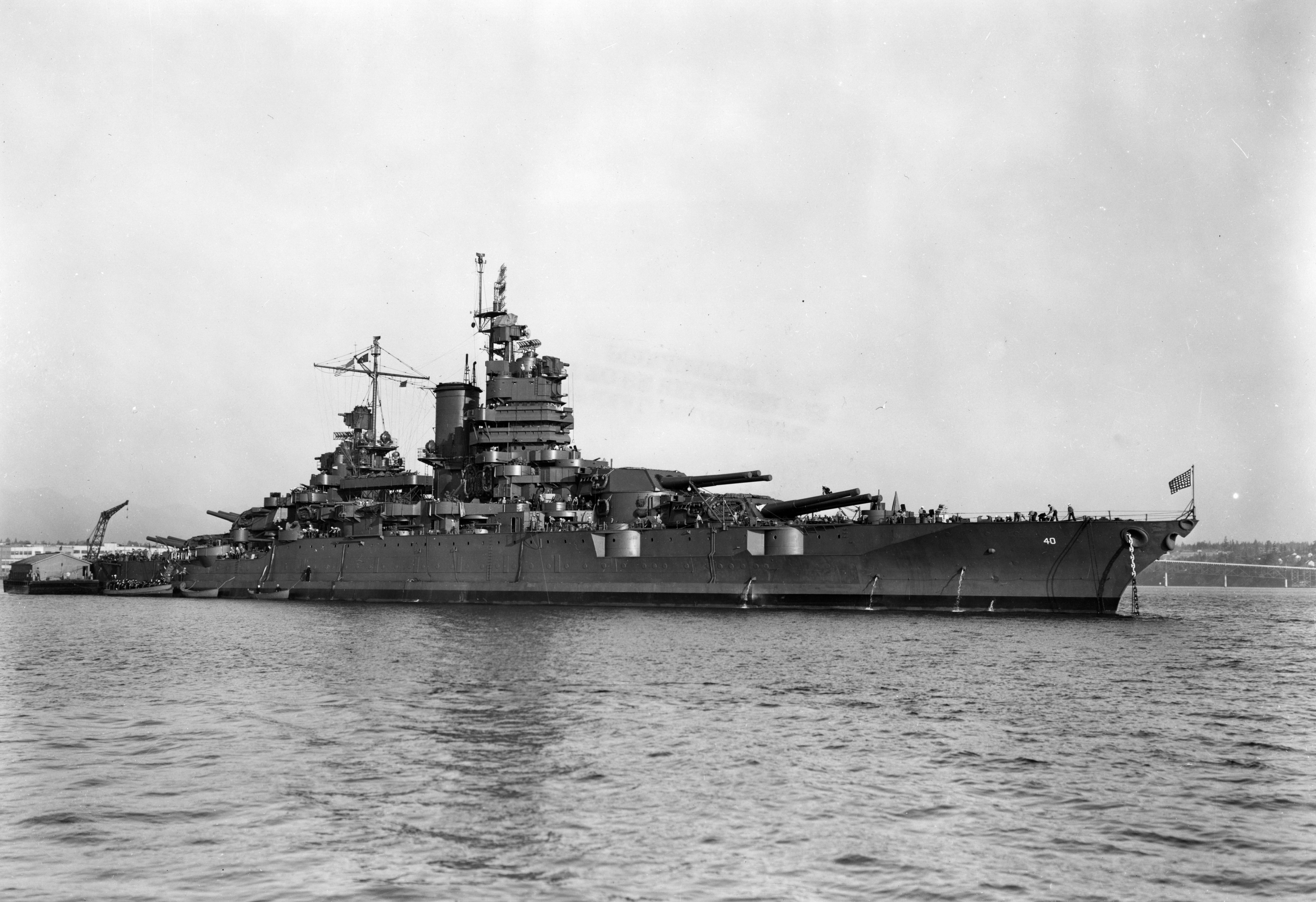
USS New Mexico

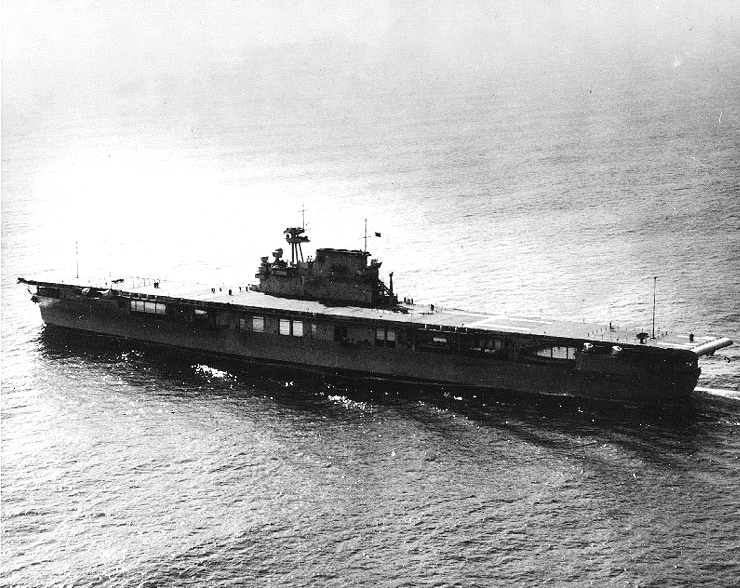
USS Yorktown

Battleships, Atlantic Fleet was made up of three Battleship Divisions

- Battleship Division 3 (Rear Admiral William R. Munroe)
  - USS New Mexico
  - USS Mississippi
  - USS Idaho §
- Battleship Division 5 (Rear Admiral David M. LeBreton)
  - USS New York §
  - USS Texas
  - USS Arkansas
- Battleship Division 6 (Rear Admiral John W. Wilcox Jr.)
  - USS North Carolina
  - USS Washington §

Of these, Battleship Division 5 was a training unit consisting of the oldest remaining battleships in service, while Division 6 was responsible for working up the two most recently commissioned battleships, North Carolina and Washington.

===== Aircraft, Atlantic Fleet =====
- USS Yorktown
- USS Hornet
- USS Long Island
- Carrier Division 3 (Rear Admiral Arthur B. Cook)
  - USS Ranger
  - USS Wasp

The aircraft carriers Yorktown and Long Island were directly attached to Aircraft, Atlantic Fleet, as was the newly commissioned Hornet, which was in the process of working up.

===== Cruisers, Atlantic Fleet =====
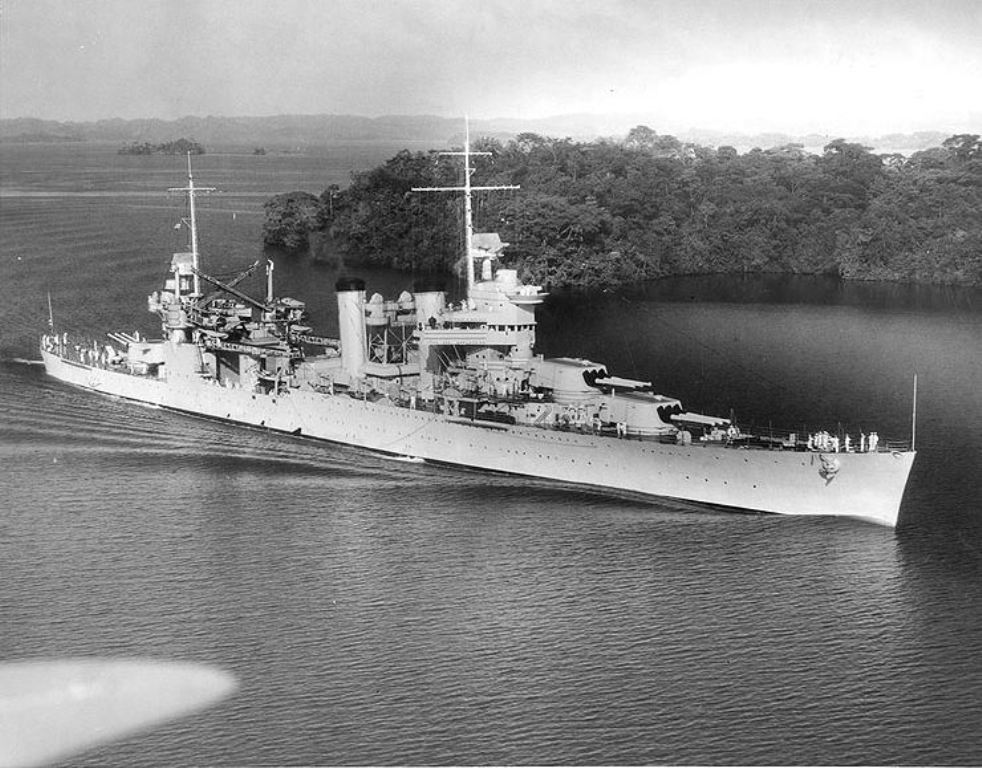
USS Vincennes

- Cruiser Division 2 (Rear Admiral Jonas H. Ingram)
  - USS Omaha
  - USS Milwaukee
  - USS Cincinnati
  - USS Memphis §
- Cruiser Division 7 (Rear Admiral Robert C. Giffen)
  - USS Tuscaloosa
  - USS Quincy
  - USS Vincennes
  - USS Wichita §
- Cruiser Division 8 (Rear Admiral H. Kent Hewitt)
  - USS Brooklyn
  - USS Philadelphia §
  - USS Savannah
  - USS Nashville

===== Destroyers, Atlantic Fleet =====
- Destroyer Flotilla Three
  - Destroyer Squadron 7
  - Destroyer Squadron 9
  - Destroyer Squadron 11
- Destroyer Flotilla Four
  - Destroyer Squadron 2
  - Destroyer Squadron 8
- Destroyer Flotilla Eight
  - Destroyer Squadron 27
  - Destroyer Squadron 30
  - Destroyer Squadron 31

===== Patrol Wings, Atlantic Fleet =====
- Patrol Wing Three
  - VP-31
  - VP-32
- Patrol Wing Five
  - VP-51
  - VP-52
- Patrol Wing Seven
  - VP-71
  - VP-72
  - VP-73
  - VP-74
- Patrol Wing Eight
  - VP-81
  - VP-82

===== Submarines, Atlantic Fleet =====
- Submarine Squadron One
  - Submarine Division 11
  - Submarine Division 12
  - Experimental Division 1
- Submarine Squadron Three
  - Submarine Division 72
- Submarine Squadron Five
  - Submarine Division 51
  - Submarine Division 52
  - Submarine Division 53
- Submarine Squadron Seven
  - Submarine Division 31
  - Submarine Division 4
  - Submarine Division 71

===== Other elements of the Atlantic Fleet =====
During World War II "Transports, Amphibious Force, Atlantic Fleet" was part of this command (ComTransPhibLant). Smaller units included the Antisubmarine Development Detachment, Atlantic Fleet (ASDEVLANT) located at Quonset Point, Rhode Island. The detachment was responsible for the study and development of antisubmarine gear during World War II. The Commander of the detachment was known as COMASDEVLANT.

Admiral King was appointed Commander-in-Chief, United States Fleet, on 20 December 1941. Rear Admiral Royal E. Ingersoll was designated, with the rank of vice admiral, to relieve him as Commander-in-Chief, Atlantic Fleet. He took command on 1 January 1942, and was advanced to the rank of admiral on 1 July 1942. To carry out this mission and other tasks CinCLant had in the meantime been reorganized, as of 1 March 1941, into ten task forces (commanded by flag officers) numbered from one to ten and named according to their intended employment. Task Force One was the Ocean Escort Force, TF2—Striking Force, TF3—Scouting Force, TF4—Support Force, TF5—Submarine Force, TF6—Naval Coastal Frontier Forces, TF7—Bermuda Force, TF8—Patrol Wings, TF9—Service Force, and Task Force 10, 1st Marine Division (commanded by a Brigadier General).

Of many significant engagements, Captain Daniel Gallery's capture of the German submarine U-505 stands out. The capture was so top secret (because of the enigma code books captured) that the ship's flag was kept by the Commander-in-Chief, Atlantic Fleet, and not handed over to Navy authorities until after the war.

=== Cold War ===
On 1 January 1946, Commander Minesweeping Forces, Atlantic Fleet (ComMinLant) was activated to command minesweepers assigned to the Atlantic Fleet. The Commander, Mine Forces, Atlantic was responsible for all Fleet mine warfare operations. Units under his command were divided into Minesweeping Squadrons (MineRon)s.

Between 1947 and 1985, the fleet commander's post was a concurrent appointment with the Commander-in-Chief of United States Atlantic Command. The Commander-in-Chief Atlantic Fleet (CINCLANTFLT) was traditionally a navy four-star admiral who also then held the positions of Commander-in-Chief United States Atlantic Command (CINCLANT) and NATO's Supreme Allied Commander Atlantic (SACLANT). But after a major reorganization of the U.S. armed forces structure following the Goldwater-Nichols Act of 1986, CINCLANFLT was separated from the two other billets. The admiral commanding the Atlantic Fleet was designated as the Deputy Commander in Chief of the Atlantic Command until 1986.

Major crises the Atlantic Fleet was involved in during the Cold War included the 1962 Cuban Missile Crisis and the 1965 United States occupation of the Dominican Republic.

The Cuban Missile Crisis meant that from 16 October 1962 a temporary command organization, for the newly required forces was necessary. The Commander in Chief, Atlantic Command (CINCLANT), Admiral Robert Dennison, became the unified commander. He also retained control of all naval components involved in tactical operations, as the Commander-in-Chief, Atlantic Fleet. The responsibility for Army and Air Force components was assigned to the Continental Army Command (CONARC) and the Tactical Air Command under the designation of Army Forces, Atlantic (ARLANT), and Air Forces, Atlantic (AFLANT). The commander of the Army XVIII Airborne Corps was designated Joint Task Force Commander to plan for any joint operations that might become necessary. Over-all direction was exercised by the President and the Secretary of Defense through the Joint Chiefs of Staff, who named the Chief of Naval Operations as their representative for the quarantine.

Major elements of the Strategic Army Corps were designated for use by ARLANT and placed in advanced alert status. Logistic support for the more than 100,000 men involved was directed by a newly established Peninsula Base Command. Preparatory steps were taken to make possible the immediate callup of high priority Army National Guard and Army Reserve units. Tactical Air Command moved hundreds of tactical fighter, reconnaissance, and troop carrier aircraft to the southeast. To make room for all these units, the bombers, tankers, and other aircraft not required for the current operations were ordered to other bases in the United States.

From the late 1960s, nuclear ballistic missile submarines of the fleet began to make thousands of deterrent patrols. The first patrol in the Atlantic Fleet area of operations was made by USS George Washington (SSBN-598).

In 1972, Commander, Anti-Submarine Warfare Force, Atlantic Fleet (Task Force 81) was headquartered at Quonset Point Naval Air Station. Under ASWFORLANTFLT was Hunter-Killer Force, Atlantic Fleet (Task Force 83), with Carrier Divisions 14 and 16 (Wasp and Intrepid, respectively), as well as the Quonset ASW Group (TG 81.2) with Fleet Air Wing 3 and surface units. More information on Anti-Submarine Warfare Force, Atlantic Fleet's, activities during the Cuban crisis can be found at the National Security Archive's document collections.

The Commander, Naval Surface Force Atlantic was formed on 1 July 1975, incorporating a number of previously separate smaller commands – mine warfare vessels/units, service vessels, and frigates, destroyers and cruisers, along with associated destroyer squadrons and cruiser/destroyer groups.

As part of a reorganization announced in July 1995 of the Atlantic Fleet's surface combatant ships into six core battle groups, nine destroyer squadrons, and a new Western Hemisphere Group, USS John Hancock (DD-981) was reassigned to Destroyer Squadron 24. The re-organization was to be phased in over the summer and take effect 31 August 1995, with homeport shifts occurring through 1998. In September 1995 the following ship assignments were intended to apply at the end of the transitional period:

- Western Hemisphere Group (to be homeported at Naval Station Pascagoula and Naval Station Mayport): USS Ticonderoga (CG-47), USS Yorktown (CG-48), USS Thomas S. Gates (CG-51) (to move to Pascagoula in FY 98), USS Robert G. Bradley (FFG-49), Conolly, Scott, DDG-993, Moosebrugger, Dewert, McInerney, Boone, Doyle, Aubrey Fitch and Stark.
- Cruiser-Destroyer Group 2/Washington Battle Group: CGN-37, CG-60
- Carrier Group 2/Stennis Joint Task Group: USS San Jacinto (CG-56), USS Monterey (CG-61)
- Carrier Group 6/Kennedy/America Joint Task Group: USS Vicksburg (CG-69), USS Hué City (CG-66), and USS Thomas S. Gates (CG-51) until Gates was transferred to the Western Hemisphere Group
- Cruiser-Destroyer Group 8/Eisenhower Joint Task Group: USS Anzio (CG-68), USS Cape St. George (CG-71)
- Cruiser-Destroyer Group 12/Enterprise Joint Task Group: USS Philippine Sea (CG-58), USS Gettysburg (CG-64)

=== 2000s ===
In February 2000, U.S. Naval Forces Southern Command was established in Puerto Rico, and the Western Hemisphere Group became Naval Surface Group 2.

After the September 11 terrorist attacks, the Atlantic Fleet sent aircraft carriers and cruisers towards New York, on the fleet commander's own initiative. Admiral Natter quickly ordered Aegis guided missile cruisers up Chesapeake Bay to provide an anti-aircraft shield over Washington DC, and USS George Washington (CVN 73) to New York with a hastily sortied complement of fighter aircraft.

On 1 October 2001, the Chief of Naval Operations designated Commander-in-Chief, Atlantic Fleet (CINCLANTFLT) as concurrent Commander, Fleet Forces Command (CFFC). In October–November 2002, the title of Commander in Chief, Atlantic Fleet was amended to Commander, U.S. Atlantic Fleet (COMLANTFLT).

In the CNO Guidance for 2003, Admiral Vernon Clark stipulated that the terms Carrier Battle Group and Amphibious ready group would be replaced by Carrier Strike Groups (CSG) and Expeditionary Strike Groups (ESGs), respectively, by March 2003. Cruiser-Destroyer and Carrier Groups (CARGRU) were also redesignated, as Carrier Strike Groups (CSG), and aligned directly under the numbered fleet commanders. The two sets of staffs were formerly under the administrative authority of their respective air and surface U.S. Navy type commands. This realignment allowed key operational leaders authority and direct access to the personnel required to more effectively accomplish the navy's mission.

The numbered fleet commanders are now responsible for the training and certification of the entire Strike Group. The organizational structure to support the carrier strike groups focuses more on placing Strike Group commanders under the authority of the certifying officer, or the numbered fleet commander. Under this new division of responsibility, the air-side type commander gains authority over the air wing, and the surface-side type commander gains authority over the carrier itself and the rest of the ships of the battle group.

On 23 May 2006, the Chief of Naval Operations renamed COMLANTFLT to Commander, U.S. Fleet Forces Command (COMUSFLTFORCOM or CUSFFC), ordered to carry out the missions currently performed by COMFLTFORCOM (CFFC) and serve as primary advocate for fleet personnel, training, requirements, maintenance, and operational issues, reporting administratively directly to the CNO as an Echelon 2 command. The previous title CFFC was disestablished at the same time. CUSFFC previously served as the Naval component of the US Joint Forces Command (USJFCOM) until the disestablishment of USJFCOM in August 2011. CFFC is also assigned as the supporting service component commander to Commander, United States Northern Command (USNORTHCOM) as well as to Commander, United States Strategic Command (USSTRATCOM).

Enterprise entered an ESRA in 2008, but the refit took longer than expected. Thus on 11 September 2009, it was announced that the carrier strike group deployment schedule would be changed to accommodate the delay in the return of the Enterprise from its current overhaul. This resulted in extending both Carrier Strike Group Eleven's 2009–2010 deployment and Carrier Strike Group Ten's 2010 deployment to eight months. Enterprise returned to Naval Station Norfolk on 19 April 2010 after completing its post-overhaul sea trials, signifying the beginning of its pre-deployment training cycle.

On 24 July 2009, Admiral John C. Harvey, Jr. relieved Admiral Jonathan W. Greenert as Commander.

=== 2010s ===
News reports in July 2011 said that in connection with the disestablishment of the United States Second Fleet, Fleet Forces Command would take over Second Fleet's duties on 30 September 2011. Effectively this meant Task Force 20 (TF 20), under a deputy commander of the fleet, took over that mission. Task Force 20 was succeeded by Task Force 80 effective 1 October 2012, with TF-80 being under the command of the director of the Maritime Headquarters, Fleet Forces Command.

The Fleet Numerical Meteorology and Oceanography Center (FNMOC), United States Naval Observatory (USNO), Naval Oceanographic Office (NAVOCEANO), Naval Oceanography Operations Command, Naval Meteorology and Oceanography Professional Development Center, were all realigned under U.S. Navy Information Dominance Forces on 1 October 2014.

Beginning in Fiscal Year 2015, the Optimized Fleet Response Plan will align carrier strike groups to a 36-month training and deployment cycle. All required maintenance, training, evaluations, plus a single eight-month overseas deployment, are scheduled throughout this 36-month cycle in order to reduce costs while increasing overall fleet readiness. This new plan streamlined the inspection and evaluation process while maintaining a surge capacity for emergency deployments. The ultimate objective is to reduce time at sea while increasing in-port time from 49% to 68%. While initially to be used by U.S. Navy carrier strike groups, the Optimized Fleet Response Plan will be adopted for all fleet operations.

Accordingly, the carrier USS Harry S. Truman (CVN-75) will be the first carrier to deploy under this new O-FRP cycle, replacing the previously scheduled Eisenhower in the deployment lineup. Additionally, the Carrier Strike Group Eight command staff will deploy with the Truman while the Eisenhower will serve as the new flagship for Carrier Strike Group Ten.

On 2 December 2020, Secretary Kenneth Braithwaite announced that U.S. Fleet Forces Command will be renamed back to United States Atlantic Fleet to focus more on the growing maritime threats coming from the Atlantic. The renaming of the command has been placed on hold, pending further review of the U.S. military footprint, resources, strategy and missions, from the global force posture review.

== Structure 2013 ==
In accordance with the Navigation Plan 2013–2017 guidance from the Chief of Naval Operations, U.S. Fleet Forces Command was to be based upon the three tenets of war-fighting, forward operations, and readiness. To achieve these objectives, Fleet Forces Command was realigned to a Maritime Operations Center (MOC) and Maritime Headquarters (MHQ) command structure. Additionally, the Commander, U.S. Fleet Forces Command (COMUSFLTFORCOM) is designated as the Joint Forces Maritime Component Commander North (JFMCC-N) to the U.S. Northern Command. Joint Forces Maritime Component Commander North consists of two Maritime Command Elements (MCE), with Maritime Command Element-East (MCE-E) being Task Force 180 and Maritime Command Element-West (MCE-W) provided from units assigned to the U.S. Pacific Fleet.

Effective 17 May 2013, Commander, U.S. Fleet Forces Command was officially designated as the naval component commander for the U.S. Northern Command. In this new capacity, the Commander, U.S. Fleet Forces Command is to contribute to the defense of North America through the coordination, collaboration, and communication with allied, coalition, and joint forces within the U.S. Northern Command's area of responsibility. Under this reorganization, the Commander, Navy Installations Command is responsible for area coordination for U.S. Naval Forces Northern Command. Additionally, Commander, Navy Region Mid-Atlantic is responsible for regional coordination for U.S. Naval Forces Northern Command.

=== Maritime Operations ===
The Maritime Operations directorate leads all phases of the pre-deployment fleet response training plan (FRTP) cycle involving those naval units assigned to the Fleet Forces Command. The directorate transitions all naval units from their operational phase to their tactical phase prior to their overseas deployment.

The Director of Maritime Operations (DMO) is an active-duty two-star rear admiral in the U.S. Navy while the Deputy Director of Maritime Operations is a one-star rear admiral from the United States Naval Reserve. As of 2013, the DMO was Rear Admiral Dan Cloyd. Maritime Operations is organized into the following directorates:

- N2/39 – Intelligence and Information Warfare
- N3/N5 – Joint / Fleet Operations
  - N31 – Maritime Operations Center (MOC)
- N041 – Global Force Management
- N042 – Force Protection
- N7 – Joint / Fleet Training

=== Maritime Headquarters ===
The Maritime Headquarters (MHQ) leads all phases prior to the pre-deployment training cycle, including resourcing, policy development, assessment, procurement, and pre-introduction of naval units assigned to the Fleet Forces Command. The MHQ transitions all naval units from their strategical phase to their operational phase prior to their pre-deployment training cycle, and in the capacity, it supports the Maritime Operations Center. The Director of Maritime Headquarters (DMHQ) is an active-duty two-star rear admiral in the U.S. Navy while the Deputy Director of Maritime Headquarters is a one-star rear admiral from the United States Naval Reserve. As of July 2013, the DMHQ was Rear Admiral Bradley R. Gehrke. The Maritime Headquarters is organized into the following directorates:

- N1 – Fleet Personnel Development and Allocation (including information architecture management and Navy Security Forces)
- N41 – Fleet Ordnance and Supply
- N43 – Fleet Maintenance
- N45/46 – Fleet Installations and Environment
- N6 – Fleet Communications and Information Systems
- N8/N9 – Fleet Capabilities, Requirements, Concepts, and Experimentation (including missile defense)
- N03FS – Fleet Safety and Occupational Health
- N03G – Fleet Religious Ministries
- N03H – Fleet Surgeon and Health Services
- N03M – Fleet Marine

=== Subordinate commands ===
U.S. Fleet Forces Subordinate Commands include the following:

- U.S. Naval Forces Northern Command
  - Combined Joint Operations from the Sea Center of Excellence (CJOS COE)
  - President, Board of Inspection and Survey (INSURV)
  - Military Sealift Command (MSC)
  - Naval Meteorology and Oceanography Command (CNMOC) (COMNAVMETOCCOM)
  - Navy Munitions Command (NMC)
  - Navy Warfare Development Command (NWDC)

=== Type commands ===
All ships are organized into categories by type. Aircraft carriers, aircraft squadrons, and air stations are under the administrative control of the appropriate Commander Naval Air Force. Submarines come under the Commander Submarine Force. All other ships fall under Commander Naval Surface Force. Type commands for Fleet Forces Command include:

- Naval Air Force U.S. Atlantic Fleet (AIRLANT)
- Submarine Force U.S. Atlantic Fleet (SUBLANT)
- Naval Surface Force Atlantic (NAVSURFLANT)
- Navy Expeditionary Combat Command (NECC)
- Naval Information Forces (NAVIFOR)

=== Task forces ===
Functional mission task forces execute force-wide Fleet logistic functions as well as providing capabilities for Joint contingency operations. These functional mission task forces include:

- Task Force 80 – Maritime Headquarters – Commander, U.S. Fleet Forces Command (MHQ – COMUSFF)
- Task Force 83 – Logistics – Military Sealift Command Atlantic (LOG – MSCLANT)
- Task Force 84 – Theater Antisubmarine Warfare Commander – Commander Submarine Force (TASC – CSL)
- Task Force 85 – Mine Warfare – Naval Surface and Mine Warfighting Development Center – MIW Division (MIW – SMWDC MIW)
- Task Force 86 – Defense Support of Civil Authorities – Navy Expeditionary Combat Command (DSCA – COMNECC)
- Task Force 87 – Reconnaissance – Commander Patrol and Reconnaissance Group (RECON – CPRG)
- Task Force 89 – Humanitarian Assistance and Disaster Relief – Expeditionary Strike Group Two (HADR – ESG 2)
- Task Force 883 – Commander, U.S. Fleet Forces Command
  - Task Group 883.1 – Hampton Roads
  - Task Group 883.2 – United States Fourth Fleet
  - Task Group 883.5 – Military Sealift Command Atlantic (MSCLANT)
  - Task Group 883.6 – Submarine Group 10 (SUBGRU 10)
  - Task Group 883.7 – Submarine Group 2 (SUBGRU 2)
  - Task Group 883.8 – Naval aircraft – Commander, Naval Air Force U.S. Atlantic Fleet
  - Task Group 883.9 – Naval Weapons Station Earle

==== Joint operations task forces ====
When constituted as a joint-service task force for Joint warfare operations, functional mission task forces for the U.S. Fleet Forces Command are given a 18X designation as shown below.

- Task Force 180 – Maritime Headquarters – Joint Forces Maritime Component Commander North (MHQ – COMUSFF)
- Task Force 183 – Logistics – Military Sealift Command Atlantic (LOG – MSCLANT)
  - Task Group 183.1 – Hampton Roads
  - Task Group 183.2 – United States Fourth Fleet
  - Task Group 183.5 – Military Sealift Command Atlantic (MSCLANT)
  - Task Group 183.6 – Submarine Group Ten (SUBGRU 10)
  - Task Group 183.7 – Submarine Group Two (SUBGRU 2)
  - Task Group 183.8 – Naval aircraft – Naval Air Force U.S. Atlantic Fleet
  - Task Group 183.9 – Naval Weapons Station Earle
- Task Force 184 – Theater Antisubmarine Warfare Commander – Commander Submarine Force (TASC – COMNAVSUBFOR)
- Task Force 185 – Mine Warfare – Naval Surface and Mine Warfighting Development Center – MIW Division (MIW – SMWDC MIW)
- Task Force 186 – Defense Support of Civil Authorities – Navy Expeditionary Combat Command (DSCA – COMNECC)
- Task Force 187 – Reconnaissance – Commander Patrol and Reconnaissance Group (RECON – CPRG)
- Task Force 189 – Humanitarian Assistance and Disaster Relief – Expeditionary Strike Group Two (HADR – ESG 2)

== See also ==
- List of units of the United States Navy
- United States Pacific Fleet

U.S. Armed Forces operations commands

- United States Army Forces Command
- United States Marine Corps Forces Command
- Air Combat Command
- Air Force Global Strike Command
- Space Operations Command
