= Coulommiers =

Coulommiers may refer to:

- Coulommiers cheese, a soft ripened cheese from Coulommiers in the Seine-et-Marne department of France.
- Gare de Coulommiers, a railway station serving the town Coulommiers in the Seine-et-Marne department of France.
- Canton of Coulommiers, a French administrative division, located in the arrondissement of Meaux, in the Seine-et-Marne department of France.
- Coulommiers – Voisins Aerodrome, an airport serving Coulommiers in the Seine-et-Marne department of France.
- Coulommiers, Seine-et-Marne, a commune in the Seine-et-Marne department in France.
