= 1st Moroccan Division (1939) =

1st Moroccan Division 1^{re} Division Marocaine
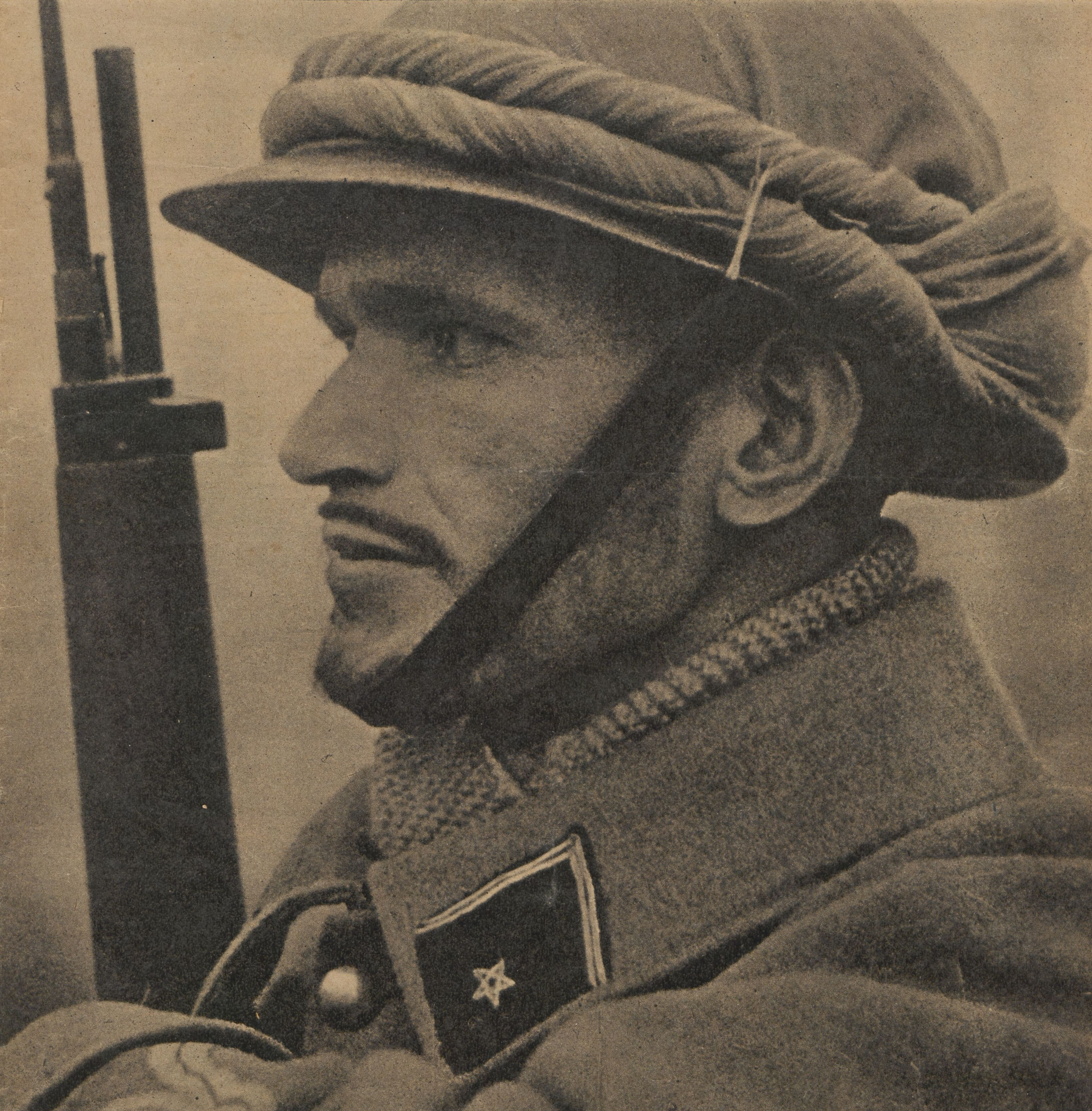
- Tirailleurs marocains of the 1st Moroccan Division, 1939.
- Active: 27 October 1939 - 2 June 1940
- Country: France
- Branch: French Army
- Type: Infantry Division
- Role: Infantry
- Engagements: World War II; Battle of France; Siege of Lille (1940)

Insignia
- 1^{re} D.M: 1^{re}Division Marocaine

The 1st Moroccan Division (French: 1re division marocaine (1939), 1^{re}D.M) was a colonial Moroccan infantry division of the French Army's Army of Africa. Created on 27 October 1939, it participated in the Battle of France (May–June 1940) during World War II. It fought with distinction in the Battle of Gembloux on 15 May 1940 and subsequently during the defense of Lille at the end of May 1940.

== Creation and dissolution ==
- Created on 27 October 1939. Formed of serving regiments from French Morocco, the division was assigned to the north-eastern front, upon arrival in metropolitan France
- Dissolution in 1940

== World War II (1939–1940) ==
Formed in Meknès on 2 September 1939, the division was sent to Oran on 24 October. It disembarked at Marseille and from there travelled from Bayonne to Luchon and from Toulouse to La Rochelle before making its way by rail on 14 November to the zone de Fresnes-en-Woevre, Vigneulles-les-Hattonchâtel and Sponville.

=== Front de Lorraine ===
On 17 December the 1st Moroccan Division relieved the 1e D.I.N.A in the sector of Eizange (Third Army (France)), with a command post at Bertrange. On 23 January 1940 the division was in turn relieved by the 20^{e} D.I and regrouped in the zone of Uckange, Moyeuvre, Roncourt, while making its way by land on 3 February towards Vitry-le-François et Châlons. The division then did garrison duty for two months. On 1 April the division was transferred to the zone of de Bavai, du Quesnoy, de Maubegne with a command post at Berlaimont, forming part of the (1st Army, 5th Army Corps; 5^{e} C.A). On 4 April the division relieved the 82^{e} D.I.A in the sector of Hainaut, de Wargnies-le-Petit at la Sambre.

=== Bataille de la Dyle ===
On 10 May 1940 the division advanced by night towards Mons, Havre and Sars-la-Bruyère. On the 11, the division made its way, again by night, towards Houdeng, Thieu and Seneffe. On 12 and 13 May, the 1^{er} and 2^{e} R.T.M was transported by truck to take position in Ernage-Gembloux. On 14 May it was involved in confused actions around Ernage under bombardments from stukas and German artillery. On the morning of 15 May, Ernage was lost. Following communications breakdowns with the 1st Motorized Infantry Division (1^{re} DIM), orders were given for retreat along the V.F de Tilly; a difficult maneuver. On 16 May, the division took up positions on the Villers-la-Ville at Marbais, a continuous combat. On the 17th the division retreated behind the canal Charleroi-Bruxelles, then towards Mons. Communications between units were disrupted. On 18 May, elements of the division were regrouped at the south-west of Valenciennes.

Two commemorative plaques were placed at the foot of the steps of the Church of Saint-Pierre de Noirmont, near Ernage in memory of the combatants from the 110th Infantry Regiment (French: 110^{e} régiment d'infanterie, 110^{e} R.I) and the 1st Moroccan Division which fell in combat around the town.

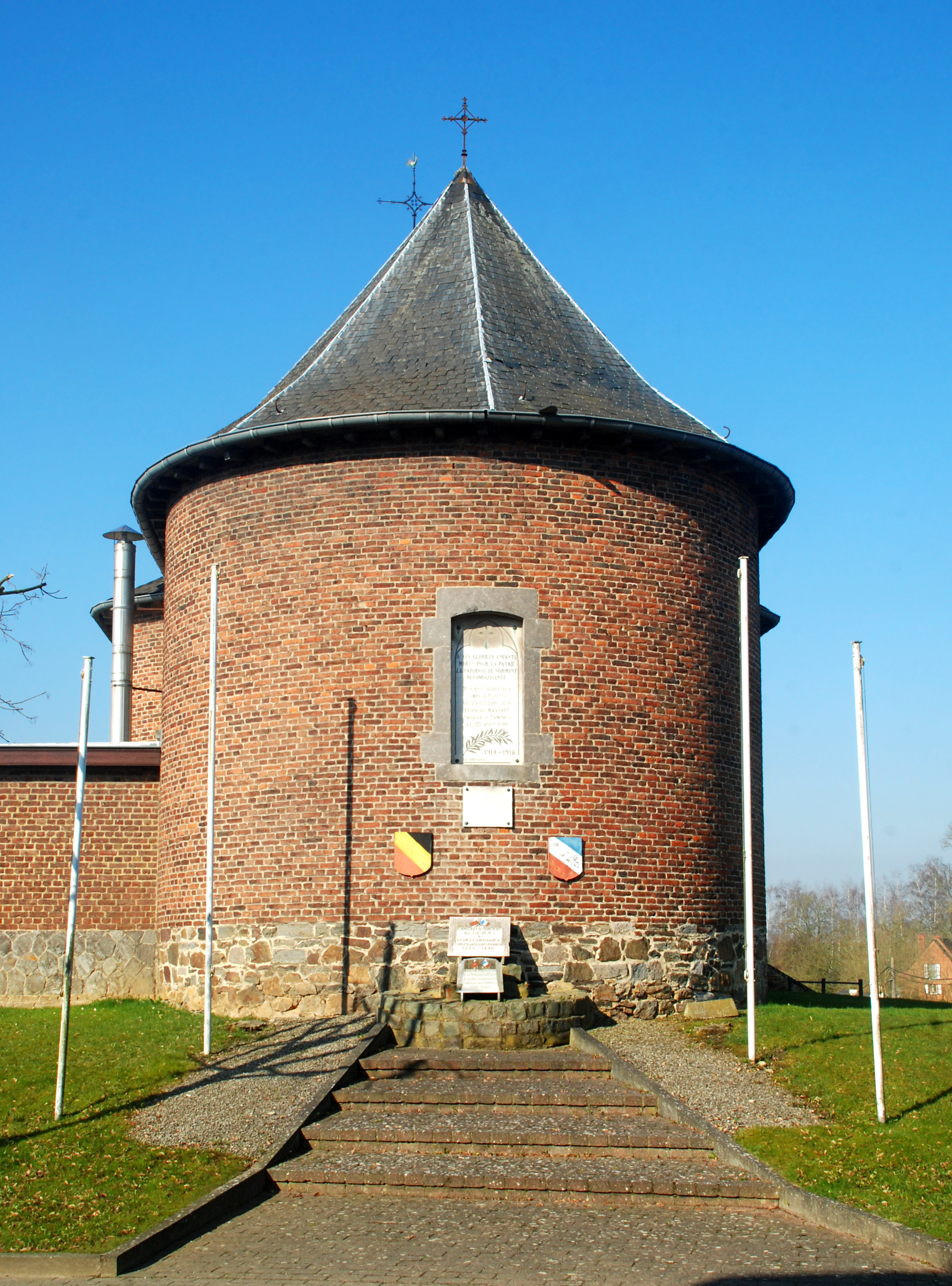

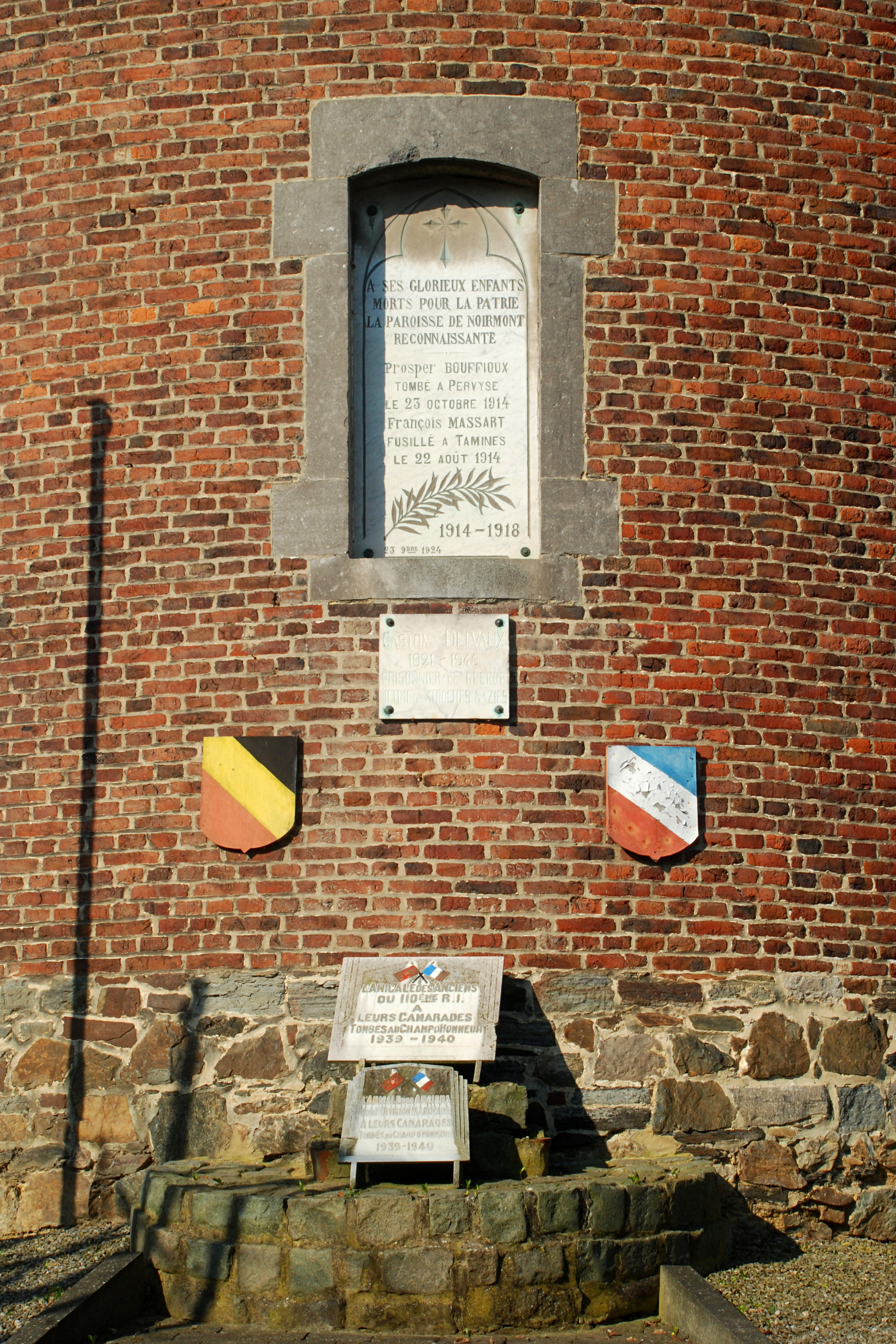

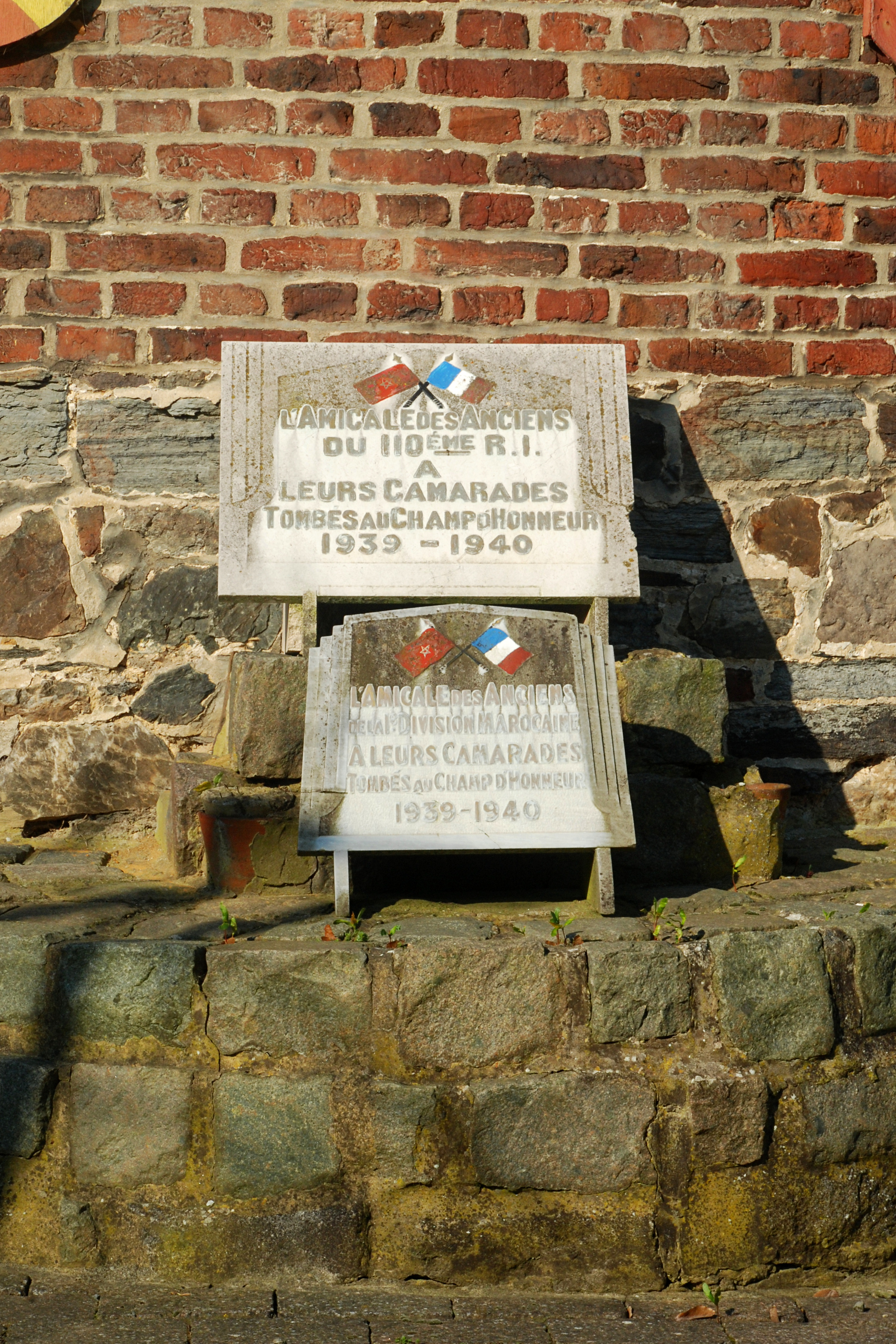

=== Bataille du Nord ===
On 19 May the remaining men of the division took up position facing south-east, on the Escaut, at the bridge of Rouvignies at Bouchain. On 20 May, German forces reached Escaut at the bridge. The French position was reestablished by a counter-attack. Regrouping in the zone of Marchiennes-Campagne, Warlaing, Erre, the division made its way north of la Scarpe on 21 May, from Wred to Warlaing. On 22 and 23 May the 2e and 7^{e} R.T.M (Regiments of Moroccan Tirailleurs) were reorganized in marching battalions. One artillery regiment was destroyed. On the 24th the division made its way along the canal of la Deule, facing south-west, from Oignies to Baraques. On the 25th, the division was engaged in combat at Meurchin and Pont-à-Vendin. On the 26th German forces crossed the la Deule canal at bridges in de Courrières and Maudit, and seized suburbs south of Carvin. The arrival of elements of the 2^{e} D.I.N.A allowed the reestablishment of the Camphin front at Provin, Les Baraques, through a counter-attack by the 3^{e} D.L.M. Following fighting at Don and Allennes on the 27th, the division retreated by night to Lys. On the 28th broken up into three sections, the 1st Moroccan Division retreated towards Lille. It was engaged in combat in Lille-Canteleu on the 29th and 30th. Elements of the division united at Malo-Terminos and succeeded in taking ship for England. Following losses at sea through aerial bombardments, the remains of the division were in England from 2 to 5 June, before being transported to Brest. It was reorganized in the Beaumesnil Zone on 8 and 9 June. In Barre-en-Ouche, the division located the regimental transport and the support services, that had been evacuated to the north before the division's encirclement.

Now numbering almost 4,000 men the 1st Moroccan Division made its way to Risle, la Ferrière and la Neuve-Lyre on 10 June. Reinforced by two battalions of the 1e R.T.M, the division was transferred to the 1st Light North-African Division.

== 1st Moroccan Division ==
From 10 May to 24 June the 1st Moroccan Division lost 700 men killed in action. Of this total 70% were Maghrebis (indigenous soldiers from Morocco and Algeria).

=== Composition ===
In 1940 the 1st Moroccan Division consisted of almost 61% Moroccan military volunteers and 39% of French cadres (officers, sous-officiers, and French volunteers).

=== Infantry ===
- 1st Moroccan Tirailleurs Regiment (French: 1^{er} régiment de tirailleurs marocains; 1er RTM) : Colonel Rouyer, then Lieutenant-Colonel Bocat (12 May 1940), Commandant Flamant (22 May 1940)
- 2nd Moroccan Tirailleurs Regiment (French: 2^{e} régiment de tirailleurs marocains; 2e RTM) : Lieutenant-Colonel Brial then Lieutenant-colonel Suffren (22 October 1939), Colonel Cordier (15 January 1940), Lieutenant-Colonel Leussier (22 May 1940)
- 7th Moroccan Tirailleurs Regiment (French: 7^{e} régiment de tirailleurs marocains; 7e RTM): Colonel Vendeur

=== Artillery ===
- 64th African Artillery Regiment (French: 64^{e} régiment d'artillerie d'Afrique; 64e RAA)
- 264th Heavy Artillery Regiment (French: 264^{e} régiment d'artillerie lourde; 264e RALD)

== Corps Attachments ==
- 4th Army Corps (général Aymes) of the Ist Army.

== Division Commander ==
Commandant : général Audet (1939 - 26 February 1940), then général Mellier (27 February 1940). Chef d'état-major : Commandant Nardin, then Captain Castaing (22 May 1940). Infantry Division Commandant: Colonel Crépin. Artillery Division Commandant: Colonel Ronin.

== Distinctions ==
Battle Honors

The battle honour Gembloux 1940 was added to the regimental flags of the :

- 1st Moroccan Tirailleurs Regiment
- 2nd Moroccan Tirailleurs Regiment
- 7th Moroccan Tirailleurs Regiment
- 64th African Artillery Regiment

Collective citations at the orders of the Armed Forces: Following the war, the regiments of the 1st Moroccan Division received eight citations from the French Armed Forces and Belgium Armed Forces.

A road in Gembloux, Belgium bears the name of Rue de la Première Division Marocaine (Road of the 1st Moroccan Division).

== See also ==
- Moroccan Division
