= Upham (surname) =

Upham is a surname, and may refer to

- Alexander Upham (1802–1841), farmer, merchant, ship builder and political figure in Nova Scotia, Canada
- Alfred H. Upham (1877–1945), president of Miami University from 1928
- Alonzo S. Upham (1811–1882), New York politician
- Bill Upham (1888–1959), American baseball player
- Calvin H. Upham (1828–1892), American politician in Wisconsin
- Charles Upham (1908–1994), New Zealand soldier, most decorated Commonwealth soldier in WW2
- Charles W. Upham (1802–1875), historian and U.S. Representative from Massachusetts
- Daniel Phillips Upham (1832–1882), Republican politician and Arkansas State Militia commander
- Don A. J. Upham (1809–1877), American lawyer and Wisconsin politician
- Edward Upham (1776–1834), antiquarian and orientalist
- Ernest Upham (1873–1935), New Zealand cricketer
- Frank B. Upham (1872–1939), U.S. Navy admiral
- George B. Upham (1768–1848), U.S. Representative from New Hampshire
- Jabez Upham (1764–1811), U.S. Representative from Massachusetts
- John Upham (born 1941), American baseball player
- Joshua Upham (1741–1808), American lawyer who became a judge and political figure in New Brunswick, Canada
- Misty Upham (1982–2014), Native American actress
- Nathaniel Gookin Upham (1801–1868), American jurist and president of the Concord and Montreal Railroad
- Nathaniel Upham (1774–1829), U.S. Representative from New Hampshire
- Oscar J. Upham (1871–1949), U.S. Marine, Medal of Honor recipient
- Richard Upham (1716 – c. 1775), political figure in Nova Scotia, Canada
- Samuel C. Upham (1819–1885), American journalist and counterfeiter of Confederate money
- Steadman Upham (1949–2017), American anthropologist, University of Tulsa president
- Thomas Cogswell Upham (1799–1872), American philosopher and educator
- Timothy Upham (1783–1855), American soldier in the War of 1812, subsequently collector of customs and politician
- Warren Upham (1850–1934), American geologist, archaeologist and librarian
- William Upham (1792–1853), U.S. Senator from Vermont
- William H. Upham (1841–1924), U.S. Army major, businessman and governor of Wisconsin

== See also ==
- Upham (disambiguation)
