= Felix Gygax =

American naval officer (1884–1977)

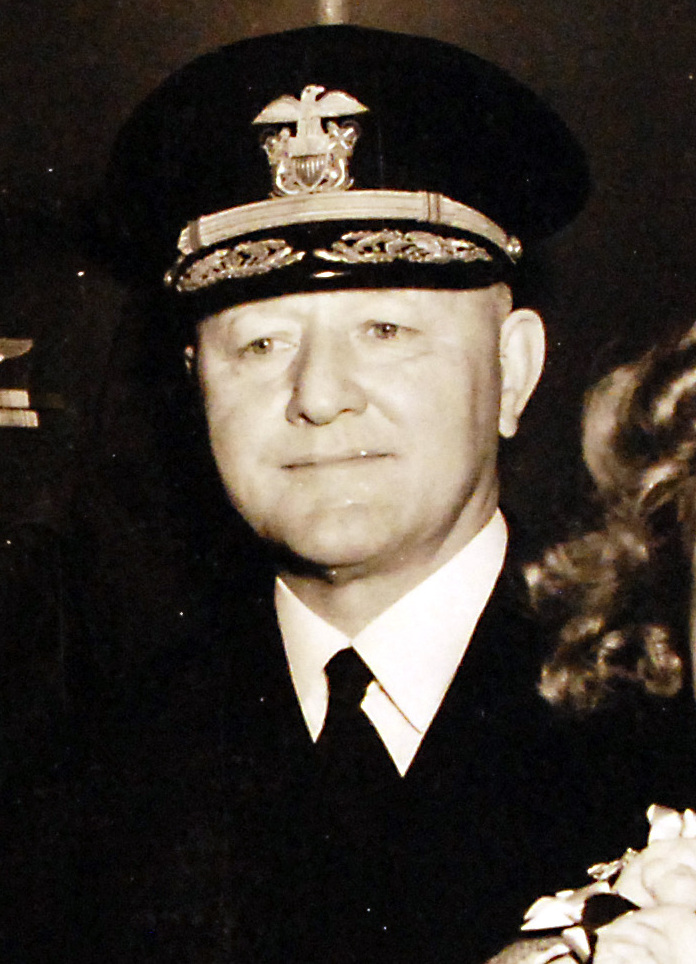
Gygax in 1944

Felix Xerxes Gygax (March 30, 1884 – February 24, 1977) was an American naval officer. He served as a rear admiral during World War II.

== Early life ==
Felix Xerxes Gygax was born on March 30, 1884, in Twin Creek, Kansas, to Regina and Rudolph Gygax. His parents emigrated from Switzerland. According to Gygax, as a youth, he tried to seek appointment to the United States Military Academy, but was unsuccessful, so he sought appointment to the United States Naval Academy. A member of the class of 1907 at the naval academy, he graduated early in 1906 due to an urgent need for naval officers.

== Career ==
Gygax served two years on the USS Kearsarge (BB-5) during its "round the world" cruise with the Great White Fleet. He was commissioned as an ensign in 1908. In 1911, he was assigned special duty related to Diesel submarine engines in Winterthur, Switzerland. He also served as a naval attaché in Bern. In September 1911, he was promoted to lieutenant (junior grade). From late 1913 to 1920, he continued working on submarines. During this period, he also commanded Submarine Division 14 at the submarine school at the Naval Submarine Base New London in New London, Connecticut. He served on the USS R-18. He was awarded the Victory Medal (Submarine Clasp) for his work. He establish the submarine base at Pearl Harbor. He was promoted in January 1914 to lieutenant. He was promoted to lieutenant commander with a temporary designation in August 1917. He was promoted to lieutenant commander in July 1918 and as commander with a temporary designation in September 1918. In March 1922, he was promoted to commander.

From 1924 to 1932, Gygax served with the engineering section of the fleet training division as an aide and flag secretary to Admiral Charles Frederick Hughes and battle force commander. Later in that period, he was commander in chief of the United States fleet, served in the office of chief of naval operations, and as an executive officer of the battleship USS Colorado (BB-45).

From 1932 to 1935, Gygax was professor of naval science and tactics and officer in charge of the naval ROTC unit at the University of California, Berkeley. From April 1935 to 1937, he served as the captain of the USS Augusta (CA-31). The Augusta served as the flagship for the chief of the Asiatic fleet, successively commanded by Frank B. Upham, Orin G. Murfin, and Harry E. Yarnell. While in this duty, he was received by the Emperor of Japan. In December 1940, he was promoted to rear admiral.

By 1942, Gygax was the commandant of the Norfolk Naval Shipyard. On October 28, 1944, he succeeded Manly H. Simons as commandant of the First Naval District and the navy yard in Boston. In 1946, he was awarded the Order of the British Empire and named honorary commander of the order. In 1946, he was awarded the Legion of Merit Medal for his service as commandant of the First Naval District. He retired on April 1, 1946.

== Personal life ==
Gygax married teacher Estelle May Ise on November 14, 1911. She died in 1965. They had two sons, Felix Jr. and Rex.

Gygax died on February 24, 1977, at a hospital in San Diego. He was buried at Arlington National Cemetery.

== Awards ==
In 1944, Gygax was awarded the 1943 First Citizen Medal from Portsmouth, Virginia, an award given by the Portsmouth Lodge No. 898, Loyal Order of Moose. His award was in part for his support of the Community Chest Campaign at the Navy Yard.
