= Upham =

Upham may refer to:

== Places ==
- Upham, Hampshire, England
- Upham, New Mexico
- Upham, North Dakota
- Upham, Wisconsin, named for Governor William H. Upham
  - Upham Mansion, Marshfield, Wisconsin, his home
- Upham Parish, New Brunswick
- Upper Upham, Wiltshire, England

== People ==
- Upham (surname)

== Ships ==
- USS Upham (DE-283), a United States Navy destroyer escort converted during construction into the high-speed transport USS Upham (APD-99)
- USS Upham (APD-99), a United States Navy high-speed transport in commission from 1945 to 1946
