= USS Augusta (CA-31) =

Northampton-class heavy cruiser (1931-46)

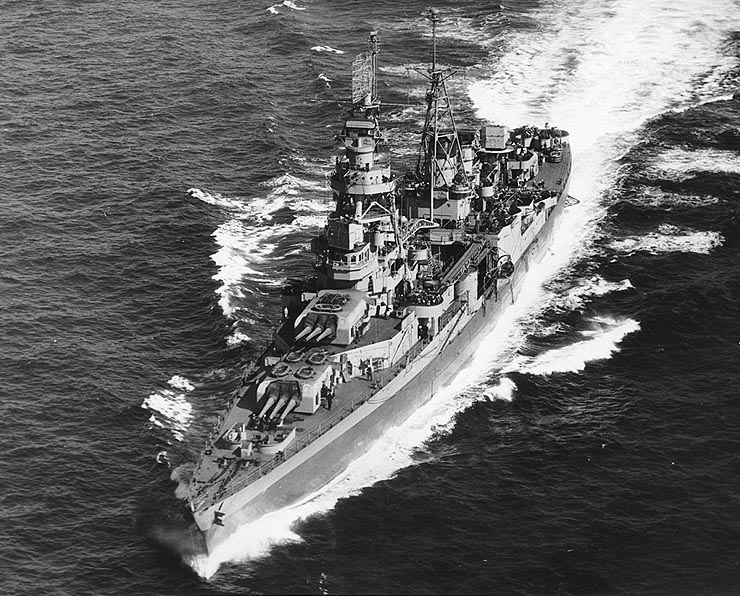
- USS Augusta (CA-31), steaming off Portland, Maine, on 9 May 1945.

History

United States
- Name: Augusta
- Namesake: City of Augusta, Georgia
- Ordered: 18 December 1924
- Awarded: 13 June 1927
- Builder: Newport News Shipbuilding, Newport News, Virginia
- Cost: $10,567,000 (contract price)
- Laid down: 2 July 1928
- Launched: 1 February 1930
- Sponsored by: Miss Evelyn McDaniel
- Commissioned: 30 January 1931
- Decommissioned: 16 July 1946
- Reclassified: CA-31, 1 July 1931
- Stricken: 1 March 1959
- Identification: Hull symbol: CL-31; Hull symbol: CA-31; Code letters: NIDF
- Honours and awards: 3 × battle stars; Presidential flagship
- Fate: Sold for scrap, 9 November 1959

General characteristics (as built)
- Class & type: Northampton-class cruiser
- Displacement: 9,050 long tons (9,195 t) (standard)
- Length: 600 ft 3 in (182.96 m) oa; 569 ft (173 m) pp
- Beam: 66 ft 1 in (20.14 m)
- Draft: 16 ft 4 in (4.98 m) (mean); 23 ft (7.0 m) (max)
- Installed power: 8 × White-Forster boilers; 107,000 shp (80,000 kW)
- Propulsion: 4 × Parsons reduction steam turbines, Curtis cruising gears; 4 × screws
- Speed: 32.7 kn (37.6 mph; 60.6 km/h)
- Range: 10,000 nmi (12,000 mi; 19,000 km) at 15 kn (17 mph; 28 km/h)
- Capacity: 1,500 short tons (1,400 t) fuel oil
- Complement: 116 officers 679 enlisted
- Armament: 9 × 8 in (203 mm)/55 caliber guns (3x3); 4 × 5 in (127 mm)/25 caliber anti-aircraft guns; 2 × 3-pounder 47 mm (1.9 in) saluting guns; 6 × 21 in (533 mm) torpedo tubes
- Armor: Belt: 3–3 3/4 in (76–95 mm); Deck: 1–2 in (25–51 mm); Barbettes: 1 1/2 in (38 mm); Turrets: 3/4–2 1/2 in (19–64 mm); Conning Tower: 1 1/4 in (32 mm)
- Aircraft carried: 4 × Curtiss SOC Seagull scout-observation floatplanes
- Aviation facilities: 2 × Amidship catapults

General characteristics (1945)
- Armament: 9 × 8 in (203 mm)/55 caliber guns (3x3); 8 × 5 in (127 mm)/25 caliber anti-aircraft guns; 2 × 3-pounder 47 mm (1.9 in) saluting guns; 6 × quad 40 mm (1.6 in) Bofors guns; 20 × 20 mm (0.79 in) Oerlikon cannons

USS Augusta (CL/CA-31) was a Northampton-class cruiser of the United States Navy, notable for service as a headquarters ship during Operation Torch, Operation Overlord, and Operation Dragoon, and for her occasional use as a presidential flagship carrying both Franklin D. Roosevelt and Harry S. Truman under wartime conditions (including during the conference which led to the Atlantic Charter). She was named after Augusta, Georgia, and was sponsored by Miss Evelyn McDaniel of that city.

== Construction ==
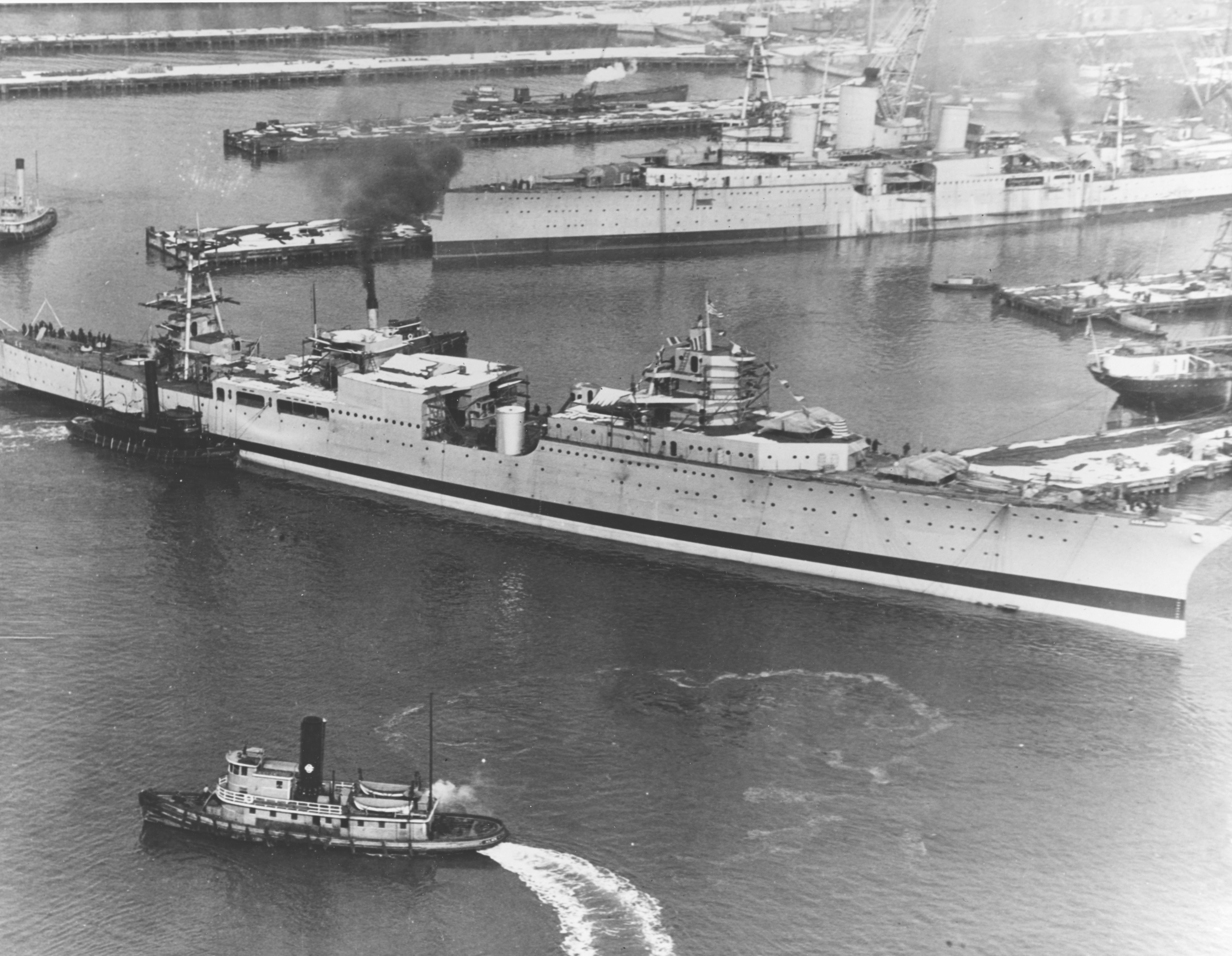
Launch of Augusta in Newport News, February 1, 1930. USS Houston is seen fitting out in the background.

Augusta, a "Treaty" cruiser of 10,000 tons normal displacement, was laid down on 2 July 1928 at Newport News, Virginia, by Newport News Shipbuilding and Dry Dock Co.; launched on 1 February 1930, sponsored by Evelyn McDaniel of Augusta, Georgia; and commissioned at the Norfolk Navy Yard, Portsmouth, Virginia, on 30 January 1931, Captain James O. Richardson in command. Originally classified as a light cruiser, CL-31, because of her thin armor. Effective 1 July 1931, Augusta was redesignated a heavy cruiser, CA-31, because of her 8-inch guns in accordance with the provisions of the London Naval Treaty of 1930.

== Service history ==
Damage to one of her turbines curtailed the ship's original shakedown cruise, but Augusta conducted abbreviated initial training during a cruise to Colón, Panama, and back, before she was assigned duty as flagship for Commander, Scouting Force, Vice Admiral Arthur L. Willard, on 21 May 1931. During the summer of 1931, she operated with the other warships of Scouting Force, carrying out tactical exercises off the New England coast. In September, Augusta moved south to Chesapeake Bay, where she joined her colleagues in their normal fall gunnery drills until mid-November, when the cruisers retired to their home ports. Augusta entered the Norfolk Navy Yard at that time.

At the beginning of 1932 she and the other cruisers of the Scouting Force reassembled in Hampton Roads, whence they departed on 8 January on their way to Guantánamo Bay, Cuba. Augusta conducted training evolutions with the Scouting Force in the vicinity of Guantanamo Bay until 18 February, when the force headed for the Panama Canal on its way to the eastern Pacific to participate in Fleet Problem XIII. She arrived in San Pedro, California, on 7 March but returned to sea three days later to execute the fleet problem. During the maneuvers Augusta and her colleagues in Scouting Force squared off against Battle Force in defense of three simulated "atolls" located at widely separated points on the West Coast. The exercises afforded the Fleet training in strategic scouting and an opportunity to practice defending and attacking a convoy.

The Fleet Problem ended on 18 March, but Augusta and the rest of Scouting Force did not return to the Atlantic at its conclusion as was normal. In a gesture that presaged Roosevelt's retention of the Fleet at Pearl Harbor in 1940 after Fleet Problem XXI, the Hoover Administration kept the Fleet concentrated on the West Coast throughout 1932 in the unrealized hope that it might restrain Japanese aggression in China. In fact, Scouting Force was still on the West Coast almost a year later when the time came for Fleet Problem XIV in February 1933, and the Roosevelt Administration, which took office in March, proceeded to keep it there indefinitely. Consequently, Augusta continued to operate in the eastern Pacific until relieved of duty as Scouting Force's flagship late in October 1933. The cruiser left the Navy Yard, Puget Sound, Washington, and sailed for China on 20 October.

=== Asiatic Fleet ===
Steaming along the Northern Pacific "Great Circle" route from Seattle to Shanghai, Augusta moored in the Huangpu River, at Shanghai, on the morning of 9 November 1933. That afternoon, Admiral Frank B. Upham, Commander in Chief, Asiatic Fleet (CinCAF), broke his flag on board the newly arrived cruiser, and his old flagship, Houston, sailed for the United States.

Soon after she broke Admiral Upham's flag and Houston sailed for home, Augusta proceeded south from Shanghai in December 1933, and, over the next few months, operated in the Philippines, interspersing training with her yearly overhaul at Cavite and Olongapo.

That spring, Augusta returned to China waters, "showing the flag", and then steamed to Yokohama, Japan, arriving there on 4 June 1934. At 07:30 the following morning, Admiral Upham left the ship to attend the state funeral ceremonies for the late Fleet Admiral Heihachiro Togo; Augusta commenced firing 19 one-minute guns in honor of the Japanese naval hero at 08:30. Departing Yokohama with Admiral Upham embarked on 11 June, the cruiser then visited Kobe (12 to 15 June) before she proceeded to Qingdao, arriving there on 17 June, departing for Qinhuangdao 10 September, departing for Yantai 24 September, then departing for Shanghai 25 September, arriving 26 September. It was also during this time, where future Marine Lieutenant General Lewis Burwell "Chesty" Puller, the most decorated Marine in American history, would begin a sea tour as commanding officer of the Marine Detachment onboard the ship.

Augusta remained in Chinese waters, then departed Shanghai for Guam on 5 October 1934, under command of Captain Chester W. Nimitz, arriving there on the 10th. Sailing the next day, she proceeded to Australian waters for the first time, reaching Sydney on the 20th. Total complement at this time was 824: 64 officers and 760 enlisted. She remained there a week, while Admiral Upham visited the capital of Australia, Canberra, on 25 and 26 October. With CinCAF back on board on the 26th, Augusta cleared Sydney the following day for Melbourne, arriving there on 29 October. She remained there, observing the city's centenary ceremonies, until 13 November, when she sailed for Fremantle. On 20 November she sailed for the Dutch East Indies.

Augusta reached Batavia (now Jakarta) on 25 November and remained there until 3 December, when she sailed for Bali, arriving at the port of Labuhan Amok on 5 December. Underway again on the 8th, Augusta touched at Sandakan (14 to 16 December), Zamboanga (17 to 19 December), and Iloilo (20 to 21 December), before reaching Manila on the 22nd.

The heavy cruiser remained in the Philippine Islands, receiving her usual yearly overhaul at Cavite and drydocking at Olongapo, in Dewey, before she re-embarked Admiral Upham and sailed for Hong Kong on 15 March 1935. Arriving on the 16th, Augusta remained there until the 25th, while CinCAF was embarked in Isabel for a trip to Canton (17 to 20 March 1935). (The cruiser's draft did not permit her to make the passage up the Pearl River to Canton.) Augusta got underway again on the 25th for Amoy (now Xiamen) and stayed there from 26 to 29 March, before she proceeded thence to Shanghai, arriving at that port city on the last day of March. Captain Felix Gygax took over command from Nimitz in April.

Augusta remained at Shanghai until 30 April, when she sailed for her second visit to Japan, reaching Yokohama on 3 May 1935. The ship remained there for two weeks. Steaming thence to Kobe, and arriving there on 18 May for a week's sojourn, Augusta sailed for China on 25 May, and reached Nanjing, the Chinese capital, on the 29th.

The flagship remained at Nanjing until 4 June, then sailed for Shanghai, arriving the following day. "Augie Maru", as her crew had affectionately nicknamed her, stayed at Shanghai until 27 June, and sailed for North China, reaching Qingdao on the 29th. She remained there, carrying out exercises and gunnery practice, for the rest of the summer.

Augusta departed Qingdao on 30 September for Shanghai, arriving on 1 October, where, four days later, Admiral Orin G. Murfin relieved Admiral Upham as CinCAF. On 8 October, with the new CinCAF embarked, Augusta departed Shanghai for points south. Admiral Murfin transferred to Isabel to visit Bangkok (15 to 22 October), while he returned to the heavy cruiser to visit Singapore (24 to 30 October). Subsequently touching at Pontianak and Jesselton on Borneo, (31 October to 1 November and from 3 to 5 November respectively), "Augie Maru" visited the southern Philippine ports of Zamboanga (6 to 8 November) and Iloilo (9 to 10 November), before she returned to Manila on 11 November 1935.

While Augusta underwent her annual overhaul at Cavite and Olongapo, Admiral Murfin flew his flag in Isabel from 14 December 1935 to 27 February 1936. Soon afterwards the heavy cruiser, again having CinCAF on board, sailed for a succession of Philippine ports and places: Catbalogan, Cebu, Tacloban, Davao, Dumanquilas, Zamboanga, Tutu Bay, Jolo, and Tawi Tawi, before the ship returned to Manila on 29 March.

On 31 March Augusta sailed to Hong Kong, arriving on 2 April, remaining there until the 11th. During this time, Admiral Murfin embarked in Isabel for the trip up the Pearl River to Canton (6 to 8 April), returning on the latter date to reembark in his flagship to resume his voyage up the China coast. Visiting Amoy on 12 and 13 April, Augusta then paused briefly at Wusong on 16 April before proceeding up the Yangtze, reaching Nanjing on the following day. While Augusta navigated down the Yangtze to the Huangpu River, and Shanghai, Admiral Murfin continued up the Yangtze to Hankou (now Wuhan) in Isabel, flew to Yichang, then in Panay to Crossing 22, and finally back to Hankou and Shanghai in Isabel, where he rejoined Augusta on 4 May.

Augusta sailed for Japan on 21 May, for her third visit to that country, arriving at Yokohama on the 25th. The Asiatic Fleet flagship remained at that port until 5 June, when she sailed for Kobe, arriving there the following day. She remained in Japanese waters until 13 June, when she got underway for Qingdao, arriving on the 16th.

Augusta remained at Qingdao, operating thence on exercises and training, for two months, then sailed for Yantai on 17 August. Arriving the same day, she departed Yantai on the 21st, and returned to Qingdao, remaining there into mid-September.

Underway for Qinhuangdao, the port at the foot of the Great Wall of China, on 14 September, Augusta reached her destination on the 15th, where Admiral Murfin disembarked to visit the old imperial city of Beiping (now Beijing). Following his inspection of the Marine Corps legation guard at that city, CinCAF returned to Qinhuangdao by train and reembarked in his flagship on 25 September. Underway from Qinhuangdao on the 28th, Augusta visited Yantai before returning to Qingdao on the following day, 29 September 1936.

Augusta stood out of Qingdao on the same day she arrived and reached Shanghai on 1 October. At the end of that month, on 30 October, Admiral Murfin was relieved as CinCAF by Admiral Harry E. Yarnell. Shortly afterwards, with her new CinCAF embarked, Augusta stood down the Huangpu River on 3 November 1936 on her annual southern cruise.

Augusta again visited a succession of ports: Hong Kong (5 to 12 November), Singapore (16 to 23 November), Batavia (25 November to 1 December), Bali (4 to 7 December), Makassar (8 to 12 December), Tawi Tawi and Tutu Bay (14 December), Dumanquilas Bay (15 December), Zamboanga (15 to 16 December), and Cebu (17 December), before she returned to Manila on 19 December. Admiral Yarnell transferred his flag to Isabel on 2 January 1937, when Augusta entered Cavite Navy Yard for repairs and alterations that included the fitting of splinter protection around the machine gun positions at the foretop and atop the mainmast. The CinCAF used Isabel as his flagship through March, rejoining Augusta at Manila on 29 March 1937.

Augusta remained in Philippine waters for the next several days, at Manila (29 March to 2 April) and Malampaya (on 3 and 4 April) before she returned to Manila on the 5th. Touching briefly at Port San Pio Quinto on 7 and 8 April, the Asiatic Fleet flagship sailed for Hong Kong on the 8th, arriving at the British Crown Colony the following day. Shifting his flag to Isabel for the trip to Canton, Admiral Yarnell returned to Augusta on 13 April, and the heavy cruiser sailed for Shantou on the 18th. The ship visited that South China port on the 19th, and Amoy the following day, before the CinCAF shifted his flag again to Isabel for a brief trip to Pagoda Anchorage (21 to 22 April), rejoining the heavy cruiser on the 23rd.

Augusta stood up the Huangpu River on 24 April and arrived at Shanghai that day, mooring just upstream from the city proper. She remained at Shanghai until 5 May, when she sailed for Nanjing. The flagship remained at that Yangtze port from 6 May to 9 May before she got underway on the latter day for Jiujiang, further up the Yangtze. Shifting his flag to Isabel, Admiral Yarnell then visited Hankou and Yichang in that ship, transferring thence on 22 May to Panay at Yichang for the voyage up the Yangtze through the gorges and rapids that lay above that port. After visiting Chongqing, the CinCAF returned to Yichang in Wake (PR-3), where he rejoined Isabel for the trip to Hankou and Nanjing. Admiral Yarnell eventually rejoined Augusta at Shanghai on 2 June 1937.

Clearing Shanghai on 7 June, Augusta sailed for North China, and reached Qinhuangdao on the 9th, where Admiral Yarnell disembarked with members of his staff to journey to Beiping by rail, where the admiral would conduct the yearly CinCAF inspection of the legation guard. The admiral rejoined the cruiser at Qinhuangdao on 22 June and the ship sailed for Yantai (visiting that port on 24 and 25 June) and Qingdao, arriving there on 26 June for the summer.

Augusta was conducting her usual training from Qingdao when events elsewhere in that region took a turn for the worse. Political relations between China and Japan had been strained for some time. The Chinese attitude toward the steady and unrelenting Japanese encroachment into North China in the wake of the 1931 seizure of Manchuria was stiffening. Chiang Kai-shek, China's leader, asserted that China had been pushed too far, and launched strenuous efforts to improve his nation's military posture.

On the night of 7 July 1937 Japanese and Chinese units exchanged gunfire near the ornate Marco Polo Bridge in the outskirts of Beiping. The incident quickly escalated into a state of hostilities in North China, with the Japanese taking Beiping against little resistance by the end of July. Against this backdrop of ominous developments, Admiral Yarnell considered cancelling a goodwill visit to the Soviet port of Vladivostok, but was ordered to proceed.

Keeping a wary eye on developments in China, Admiral Yarnell sailed for Vladivostok in Augusta on 24 July, accompanied by four destroyers. After passing through the edge of a typhoon, Augusta and her consorts reached that Soviet port on the 28th, and remained there until 1 August, the first United States naval vessels to visit that port since the closing of the naval radio station there in 1922. As Yarnell later wrote, "The visit of this force evidently has meant a great deal to these people", as both officers and men were lavishly entertained.

Departing Vladivostok on 1 August, Augusta and the four destroyers sailed for Chinese waters, the latter returning to their base at Yantai and Augusta returning to Qingdao, where Admiral Yarnell continued to receive intelligence on the situation in North China and, as events developed around Shanghai, where increasing Chinese pressure on the comparatively small Japanese Special Naval Landing Force led to a build-up of Japanese naval units in the Huangpu River leading to that port. Hostilities commenced within days after the death of a Japanese lieutenant and his driver near a Chinese airfield on 9 August. With considerable American interests in the International Settlement of Shanghai, Admiral Yarnell deemed it best to sail there, on the morning of 13 August 1937, to make it his base of operations.

Her passage slowed by a typhoon which caused the ship to reduce her speed to five knots (9 km/h) and which produced rolls of 30 degrees and washed away the port 26-foot (8 m) motor whaleboat and its davits, Augusta reached her destination the following day, and stood up the Huangpu River. En route to her moorings she passed many Japanese warships, principally light cruisers and destroyers, which duly rendered the prescribed passing honors to Augusta's embarked admiral.

Meanwhile, at Shanghai proper, Chinese Air Force Northrop 2E light attack bomber aircraft had tried to bomb Japanese positions in their portion of the International Settlement; the bombs fell short and caused extensive damage and heavy loss of life in the neutral portion of the settlement. One plane which had retained its bombs proceeded down the Huangpu and dropped two bombs which exploded in the water off Augusta's starboard bow. Large American flags were then painted on top of Augusta's three main battery gunhouses to identify her as neutral.

On 18 August Augusta unmoored, moved further upstream, and moored off the Shanghai Bund, assisted by tugs. She remained there, in a prominent position off the famous "Bund", into January 1938, observing the Sino-Japanese hostilities at close range.

Initially, there was the problem of evacuating Americans from the war zone. American merchantmen called at Shanghai to do so, passengers travelling downstream to waiting steamships on the Dollar Line tender guarded by sailors from Augusta's landing force. The flagship's Marine Detachment, meanwhile, went ashore to aid the 4th Marines in establishing defensive positions to keep hostilities out of the neutral enclaves. On 20 August 1937, while the flagship's crew gathered amidships on the well deck for the evening movies, a Chinese anti-aircraft shell landed among the sailors, killing Seaman 1st/Class F. J. Falgout and wounding 18 others. Ten days later Chinese planes bombed the American Dollar Line SS President Hoover off the mouth of the Huangpu, with one death and several wounded. American ships ceased calling at Shanghai as a result, and Admiral Yarnell's attempts to get a division of heavy cruisers to carry out the evacuation met resistance from President Franklin Delano Roosevelt.

At Shanghai Augusta's officers and men could observe the war. Her moorings proved a good vantage point from which Americans could size up the Japanese Navy and judge how well its ships and planes operated, an opportunity not lost on Admiral Yarnell, who sent intelligence reports back to Washington, striving to alert the United States Navy to the character and capabilities of the navy many regarded as the future enemy.

On 12 December 1937 Japanese naval planes sank the US gunboat Panay and three Standard Oil tankers north of Nanjing, in the Yangtze River. Soon afterwards the ship's survivors arrived at Shanghai in Panay's sister ship, Oahu, which moored alongside Augusta on the 19th. They spent Christmas with Augusta's crew.

On 6 January 1938 Augusta departed Shanghai for the Philippines for her yearly overhaul. Admiral Yarnell, however, his presence in China deemed necessary to uphold American prestige in the Orient, remained in Shanghai with a token staff on board Isabel. He ultimately rejoined Augusta when she returned to Shanghai on 9 April 1938 after her overhaul.

Proceeding north along the China coast, Augusta visited Qingdao (12 May to 13 May) and Yantai (14 May) before she arrived at Qinhuangdao on 15 May. There, Admiral Yarnell disembarked and entrained for Tianjin and Beiping, inspecting the Marine detachments in both places before ultimately returning to Qinhuangdao to reembark in his flagship on 29 May. Proceeding thence via Yantai, Augusta reached Shanghai on 6 June; the CinCAF transferred his flag to Isabel on 23 June, and sailed for Nanjing and Wuhu, returning to Shanghai and Augusta on 27 June.

Returning to Qingdao on 3 July 1938, Augusta operated in North China waters, between Qingdao and Qinhuangdao, for the remainder of the summer and through early October. Sailing for Shanghai on 10 October, the cruiser arrived at her destination two days later, and remained there through Christmas. She sailed again for the Philippines on 27 December 1938; once again, Admiral Yarnell remained in Shanghai with his flag in Isabel.

Following her yearly navy yard overhaul, and training in Philippine waters, Augusta visited Siam, French Indochina, and Singapore en route back to Shanghai, making port at her ultimate destination on 30 April 1939. It was also during this time, where Lewis Burwell "Chesty" Puller, would begin his second stint as commander of the Augusta's Marine detachment. Again flying Admiral Yarnell's flag, she lay at Shanghai until 8 June, when she got underway for Qinhuangdao. Arriving there on 10 June, she touched at Yantai (24 to 25 June) and Qingdao (26 June to 16 July) before she sailed down to Shanghai, arriving on the 18th.

On 25 July 1939 Admiral Thomas C. Hart relieved Admiral Yarnell as CinCAF. The heavy cruiser then sailed for North China port Qingdao, on 2 August. She remained based there—and was moored there on the day war broke out in Europe with the German invasion of Poland—through late September 1939. During this period, the ship twice visited Shanghai (5 to 7 September and 15 to 19 September), and also visited Qinhuangdao, Yantai, and Beidaihe. Late in September, Admiral Hart disembarked at Qinhuangdao and inspected the Marine detachments at Beiping and Tianjin.

Returning to Shanghai on 12 October, Augusta remained there through mid-November; during this time Admiral Hart shifted his flag to Isabel and proceeded up the Yangtze to Nanjing on an inspection trip (3 to 7 November 1939). Sailing for the Philippines on 21 November, she visited Amoy en route (22 to 23 November 1939), and ultimately reached Manila on 25 November, remaining there through early March 1940.

Augusta operated in the Philippines through early April, visiting Jolo and Tawi Tawi. Admiral Hart wore his flag in Isabel during March, for cruises to Cebu, Iligan, Parang, Zamboanga, and Jolo, rejoining Augusta at Jolo on 19 March. Transferring his flag back to Isabel at Tawi Tawi two days later, Admiral Hart cruised to Malampaya Sound, ultimately rejoining his flagship on 26 March at Manila. Augusta then sailed for Shanghai while Admiral Hart, who had again transferred his flag to Isabel on 13 April, visited Shantou and Amoy, ultimately rejoining Augusta and breaking his flag on board the cruiser on 22 April.

Following a month at Shanghai, Augusta sailed for North China, visiting Qinhuangdao on 12 June before beginning her cycle of training operations from Qingdao soon afterwards. Augusta operated out of Qingdao into late September. Circumstances requiring Admiral Hart on several occasions to visit Shanghai, he travelled once to Shanghai in Isabel and back in Augusta; to Shanghai in Porpoise and back to Qingdao in Isabel; and one round trip to Shanghai and back in Marblehead. Augusta departed Qingdao for the last time on 23 September, arriving at Shanghai on the 25th.

Moving on to Manila, arriving there on 21 October, Augusta remained there into late November, to be relieved by her recently modernized sister ship Houston as Admiral Hart's flagship on 22 November 1940. Augusta sailed for the United States, clearing Manila Bay that same day.

On 24 November 1940, she was ordered to search the waters north of the Hawaiian chain, to investigate reports of the activity of "Orange" (Japanese) tankers in the vicinity. At this point on her way back from the Asiatic station, the cruiser encountered bad weather—heavy swells and fresh-to-strong cross winds—that rendered searching by her aircraft "impracticable." As she neared the focal point of her search (35 degrees north latitude, 165 degrees west longitude), Augusta darkened ship and set condition III. As she passed between the two designated points on her search, she posted special lookouts from dawn to dark. Although the visibility varied between 8 and 15 miles (15 and 28 km), Augusta's Captain John H. Magruder, Jr., estimated that his ship had swept a belt approximately 25 miles (45 km) wide, maintaining radio silence until well clear of the area searched. "Weather conditions were such that fueling at sea in the area would not have been practicable", Captain Magruder reported later, alluding to the reason why his ship had been dispatched to those waters, "and submarine operations at periscope depth would have been difficult due to the danger of broaching."

=== Refit ===
After reaching Long Beach on 10 December 1940, Augusta entered the Mare Island Navy Yard for a major refit. While Augusta had been serving as the Asiatic Fleet flagship, alterations of the type accomplished in her sister ships had been deferred until her return to the United States.

During this overhaul, the ship received significant changes in her antiaircraft battery. Four additional 5 inch (127 mm) guns were mounted atop the aircraft hangar; splinter protection was fitted for the 5 inch (127 mm) guns on the hangar and on the boat deck; interim 3 inch (76 mm) antiaircraft guns were installed (ultimate armament fit called for a one-to-one replacement of these mounts with 1.1 inch (28 mm) guns); and Mark XIX directors were installed for the 5 inch (127 mm) guns. The placement of directors and rangefinders altered her silhouette, and a pedestal was fitted atop the foremast to receive a CXAM radar antenna when it became available. Augusta was one of fourteen ships to receive the early RCA CXAM-1 radar.

=== Atlantic Fleet ===
Departing Mare Island on 11 April 1941, Augusta, her configuration altered and repainted, sailed for San Pedro, remaining there over 12 and 13 April. She transited the Panama Canal four days later, reporting for duty with the Atlantic Fleet on 17 April. Departing the Canal Zone on the 19th, the heavy cruiser arrived at Newport, R.I., on 23 April. Admiral Ernest J. King, now Commander in Chief, Atlantic Fleet, returned from Washington, D.C., on 2 May and broke his flag in Augusta. The cruiser remained at Newport, serving as the administrative CINCLANT flagship (although Admiral King journeyed to Washington again during this time), through most of May, until she sailed for Bermuda on the 24th of that month. Reaching her destination on the 26th, she remained there only until the 28th, at which time she sailed for Newport once more.

Augusta remained anchored at Narragansett Bay from 30 May to 23 June, when she sailed for the New York Navy Yard. She had been chosen for special duty, the inception of which had come in the developing personal relationship between US President Franklin D. Roosevelt and the Prime Minister of the UK (since 1939 at war with Nazi Germany), Winston Churchill. The two leaders had sought a face-to-face meeting for some time, and Harry Hopkins (President Roosevelt's personal representative) had visited Churchill and sounded him out on the proposal as early as February 1941. The President had also discussed the idea with Admiral King earlier that spring. Original intentions had been to hold such a conference in June, but British disasters in Greece and at the Battle of Crete had forced a postponement until later in the summer.

Augusta had been chosen to serve as the President's flagship as early as mid-June, shortly after Admiral King had visited Roosevelt in connection with the drafting of Western Hemisphere Defense Plan No. Four. On 16 June, the New York Navy Yard commandant was informed that Augusta would soon require an availability for the installation of her CXAM radar and 1.1 inch (28 mm) antiaircraft guns, "incident to possible future Presidential use and other urgent work." Details of the availability assignment, however, touched off a "little war" between the Bureau of Ships (BuShips) and CINCLANT. Since BuShips had no word concerning the President's plans, they issued orders to hold Augusta at New York Navy Yard for extended repairs. On 22 June, Admiral King informed BuShips, however, that alterations to the heavy cruiser "for possible use by the President were initiated by the Commander in Chief, Atlantic Fleet, after conversations with the President" and that the alteration should be limited to accomplish only "essential" items. Augusta remained in the yard at New York from 23 June to 2 July, after which time she resumed operations along the eastern seaboard, in waters off Hilton Head and Charleston, South Carolina (4 to 5 July), Hampton Roads (6 to 7 July) before she returned to Newport on 8 July. She remained there into August.

During that time, details for the meeting between President Roosevelt and Prime Minister Churchill were worked out and plans set in motion to bring it to pass. While Churchill was making the Atlantic crossing in the modern battleship Prince of Wales, the President was on his way; he departed Washington, D.C. at 1100 on 3 August for the Submarine Base at New London, Connecticut, where he embarked with his party on board the Presidential yacht Potomac, which, in company with her escort, Calypso, soon sailed for Appogansett Bay. At 2223 on 4 August Potomac anchored in Menemsha Bight, Vineyard Sound, Massachusetts, joining Augusta, which had already arrived. The cruiser Tuscaloosa and a screen of five destroyers, USS McDougal, USS Madison, USS Moffett, USS Sampson, and USS Winslow lay at anchor nearby.

At 05:30 on 5 August, Potomac came alongside Augusta and moored, the President and his party embarking in the heavy cruiser at 0617. For security purposes, the President's flag remained in Potomac while she, accompanied by Calypso, transited the Cape Cod Canal to New England waters. A Secret Serviceman, approximating the President in size and affecting his mannerisms when visible from a distance, impersonated the President. Press releases issued daily from Potomac led all who read them to believe that "FDR" was embarked in his yacht on a pleasure cruise.

Meanwhile, Augusta, accompanied by Tuscaloosa and their screening destroyers, stood out of Vineyard Sound at 0640, at 20 knots (37 km/h), passing the Nantucket Shoals Lightship at 1125. Increasing speed slightly during the night, the ships steamed on, darkened. Outside a brief two-hour period the following day, 6 August, when the formation encountered heavy fog which forced them to slow to 14 knots (26 km/h), the ships maintained a 20 to 21 knot (37 to 39 km/h) pace for the rest of the voyage to NS Argentia, Newfoundland. Ultimately, on the morning of 7 August 1941, Augusta and her consorts stood into Ship Harbour, Placentia Bay, and anchored to await Churchill's arrival.

During the forenoon, the Chief Executive indulged in one of his favorite leisure activities, fishing, from Augusta's forecastle. Roosevelt "caught a large and ugly fish which could not be identified by name and which he directed be preserved and delivered to the Smithsonian Institute [sic] upon return to Washington." At 1335, the President left the ship in a whaleboat to fish in the nearby waters, taking with him members of his party and his son, Ensign Franklin D. Roosevelt, Jr., USNR, an officer of Mayrant on temporary duty as his father's aide. Later, after a somewhat less than successful fishing expedition, the President inspected the waterfront and the base development at Argentia.

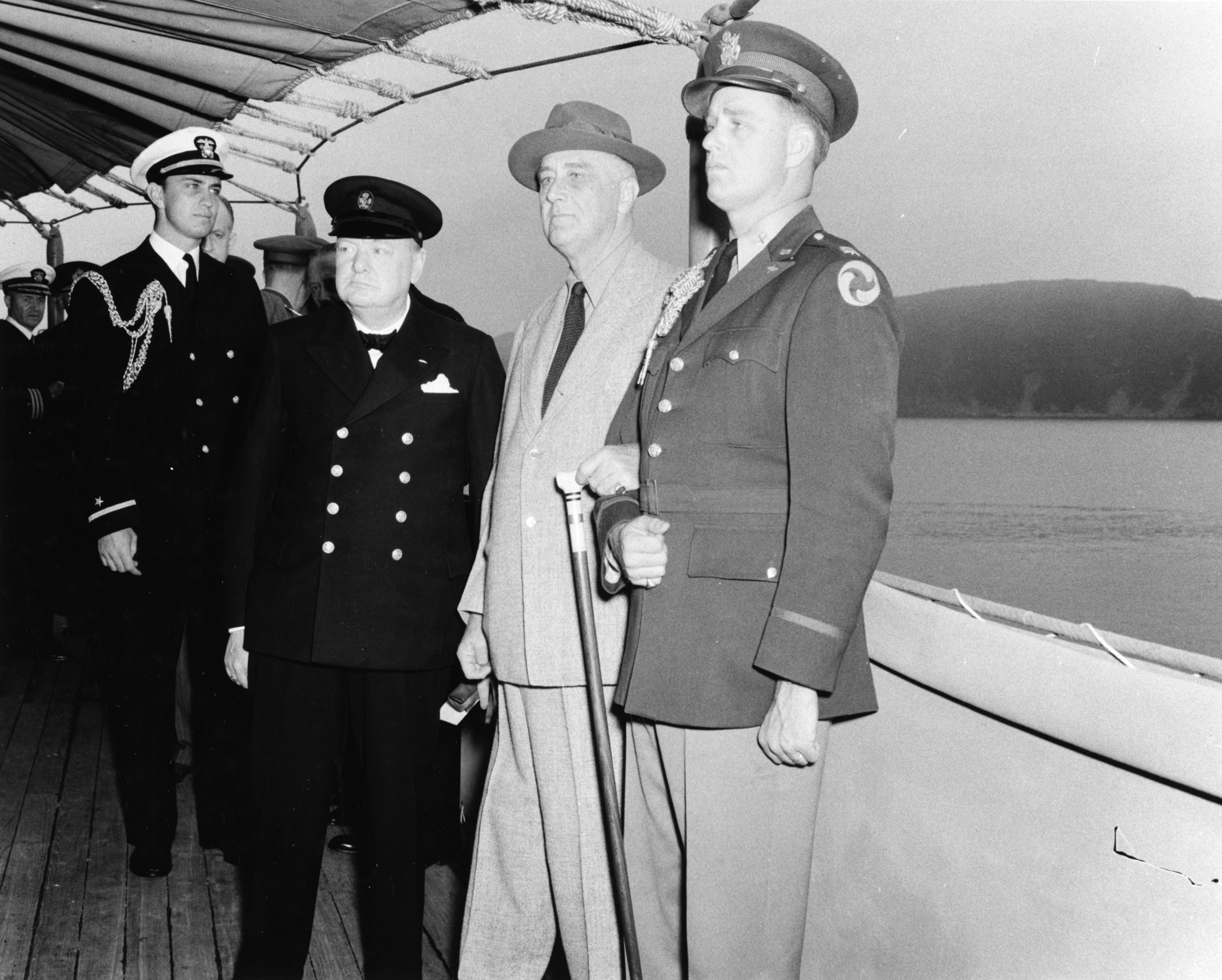
FDR and Churchill on Augusta

On 9 August, Prime Minister Churchill arrived at Argentia aboard Prince of Wales, the arrival of the battleship being viewed by the President and his party; Churchill visited the President at 1100 that day, and lunched with him in his cabin. Admiral King entertained members of the respective staffs at a luncheon in his cabin. The heavy cruiser also embarked Harry Hopkins, who had come across from England on board Prince of Wales. The Prime Minister later dined with the President, and ultimately left Augusta at 2345.

The following day, McDougal came alongside and embarked the President and his party, transporting them to Prince of Wales for divine services, an inspection of the battleship's topsides, and a luncheon. President Roosevelt again entertained the Prime Minister on board Augusta that evening. On 11 and 12 August, Prime Minister Churchill and members of his staff came on board the heavy cruiser for conferences with the President and his aides; from these discussions emerged the famed "Atlantic Charter." On the latter day, the final draft of the "Eight Points" of the charter was completed. With the meeting having been completed, President Roosevelt and his staff assembled on Augusta's quarterdeck at 1450 on 12 August to bid Prime Minister Churchill and his staff farewell. With the ship's guard and band paraded, the parting ended with the playing of God Save the King. A little over two hours later, Prince of Wales passed close aboard and rendered passing honors, after which the band stuck up Auld Lang Syne. Augusta then got under way in company with Tuscaloosa and their screening destroyers, en route to Blue Hill Bay, Maine, to rendezvous with Potomac and Calypso.

The following day, a dense fog prompted the ships to reduce speed, and the President and the members of his staff rested, preparing for the transfer to the Potomac. The following morning, 14 August, off Cape Sable, Nova Scotia, President Roosevelt went on deck to witness the operations of the first aircraft escort vessel (later CVE), Long Island, the prototype of a ship type that the Chief Executive had avidly pushed toward development. Long Island launched three Brewster F2A-2 Buffalos by the catapult method and six Curtiss SOCs by conventional carrier takeoff. That afternoon on board Augusta, Admiral King hosted a farewell luncheon for the President.

Augusta anchored at Blue Hill Bay at 1228 on 14 August, and Potomac moored alongside to commence the transfer of baggage and other gear, ultimately casting off at 1418 for passage to Rockland, Maine.

Augusta returned to Narragansett Bay on 15 August, and remained there for ten days, putting into the New York Navy Yard soon afterwards. She returned to Newport on 29 August. Admiral King retained Augusta as his flagship through the autumn, while she operated between Newport and Bermuda. During this time, she also briefly embarked Secretary of the Navy Frank Knox.

=== World War II ===
The day of the Japanese attack on Pearl Harbor, 7 December 1941, found Augusta moored at Buoy 7, Newport. From that day until the 11th, she operated out of Newport; she remained in port until 11 January 1942. During this time, on 5 January 1942. Rear Admiral Royal E. Ingersoll (one of Augusta's former commanding officers) relieved Admiral King as Commander in Chief, United States Atlantic Fleet.

Augusta stood out of Newport on 12 January, en route to Casco Bay, Maine, via the Cape Cod Canal. She arrived the next day, and after conducting training exercises, returned to Newport. On 17 January, Rear Admiral Ingersoll shifted his flag from Augusta to Constellation.

On 19 January, Augusta got underway for Bermuda, arriving two days later and joining Task Group (TG) 2.7. She operated with this unit when it proceeded to Martinique to conduct a "show offeree" between 22 February and 4 March, and returned to Shelley Bay, Bermuda, on 5 March.

As part of TG 22.7—consisting of Ranger, Savannah, Wainwright, Lang, and Wilson—she stood out on 13 March to patrol the Caribbean. Hambleton and Emmons joined the formation on 15 March, and the following day, Augusta was detached and, with Hambleton and Emmons, steamed to New York. While on passage, Augusta sent Hambleton to investigate a dim flashing light abaft her starboard beam during a heavy storm on 18 March. The destroyer rescued six survivors of the stricken Honduran steamer Ciepa, and rejoined Emmons and Augusta after nightfall.

Augusta made landfall at New York on 19 March, and the heavy cruiser underwent repairs and alterations until 7 April, when, along with Wilkes as escort, she sailed for Newport. The next morning, Wilkes was rammed by the steamer Davilla and was forced to proceed on one engine to Boston. Augusta steamed on alone to Casco Bay, arriving on 8 April. On 14 April, in company with Corry and Aaron Ward, she conducted experimental firings of turret guns against a drone simulating a torpedo plane approach, and returned to Casco Bay that night.

Two days later, escorted by Macomb, she transited the Cape Cod Canal and touched at Newport. Joining Task Force (TF) 36 there, of which Ranger was flagship, the cruiser departed on 22 April for Trinidad. A minor collision between Hambleton and Ellyson, and frequent submarine scares, accented the voyage. Merrimack joined the task force on 28 April and fueled almost all of the ships, with Augusta's scout planes maintaining an air patrol during the dangerous fueling evolution. Ranger launched 68 Army Curtiss P-40s on 10 May, the planes bound for Accra, on Africa's Gold Coast, where all landed safely.

The formation arrived at Trinidad on 21 May, where Augusta fueled before putting to sea with the task force the next day bound for Newport. On 26 May, Augusta and Corry were detached and proceeded together to Hampton Roads, anchoring there on 28 May. Two days later, Rear Admiral Alexander Sharp hoisted his flag on board Augusta and assumed command of TF 22. With Corry and Forrest as escorts, the heavy cruiser sailed on 31 May for Newport, arriving on 1 June and leaving the next day with Corn for calibration of radio direction finders in waters west of Brenton Reef Lightship. Ranger joined the two ships the same day and all proceeded to Argentia, Newfoundland, arriving there on 5 June. With Ellyson and Corn, she formed an anti-submarine screen off Argentia on 17 and 18 June, and two days later joined TF 22 steaming through heavy fogs to Newport, mooring on 22 June.

Augusta sailed south to New York for overhaul, arriving on 24 June. Completing repairs by 29 June, Augusta moved to Newport the following day, and on 1 July sortied with TF 22 for the Gulf of Paria, Trinidad, and arrived on 6 July. The formation departed two days later, Ranger completing her second ferry mission with Army aircraft, launching 72 Army planes off the coast of West Africa. Another reinforcement successfully accomplished, the task force reached Trinidad on 30 July.

The heavy cruiser then proceeded to Norfolk, and moored there on 5 August for limited availability. On 18 August, she conducted short range battle practice and night spotting exercises in Chesapeake Bay, and training continued until Augusta sortied with Ranger, Corry, Hobson and Fitch on 23 August, arriving at Newport two days later and returning to Norfolk with Corry on the last day of August. The task group also carried out gunnery training, shore bombardment, and antiaircraft defense exercises off the Virginia Capes from 7 to 11 September, and further training between 28 September and 1 October in Chesapeake Bay.

On 23 October 1942, Rear Admiral H. Kent Hewitt came on board Augusta and broke his flag as Commander, TF 34. Major General George S. Patton and Rear Admiral John L. Hall, Jr. also came on board the same day for passage to North Africa. Augusta stood out on 24 October with TF 34, steaming for French Morocco and participation in Operation "Torch."

=== Operation Torch ===
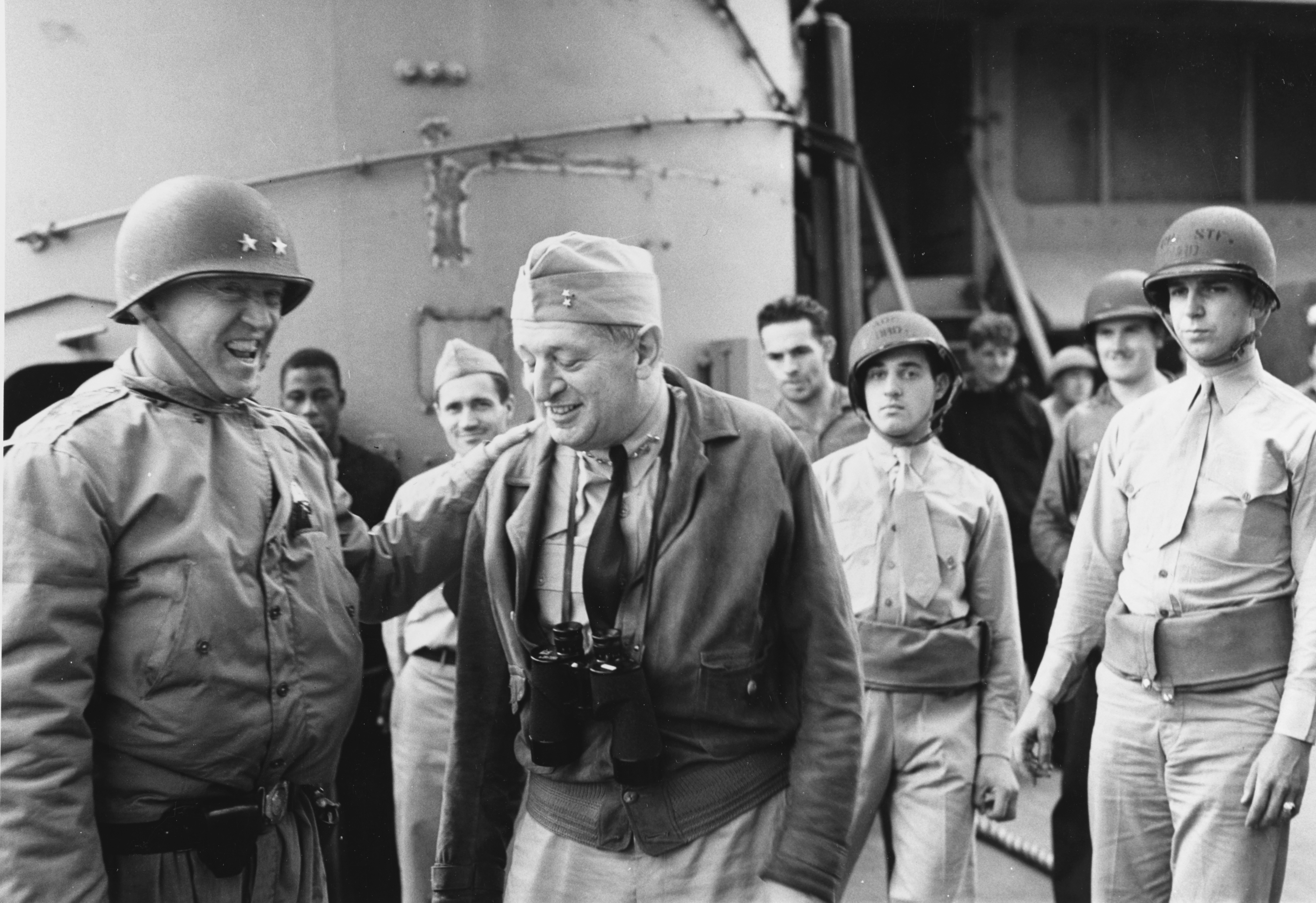
General Patton with Admiral Hewitt aboard Augusta off the coast of North Africa.

With the initial element of surprise, at 0000 GMT on 8 November 1942, Augusta, under Admiral Henry Kent Hewitt, reached the shores off Casablanca and the Task Force commenced disembarking the invasion troops under the command of General Patton who, at the time, was directing the assault from Augusta. The ship's war diary contains the following entry for that morning's Naval Battle of Casablanca:

"The landing of our boats was heavily opposed by both shore installations and French troops and at 0617 the order to "Play Ball" was received – this meant that we were to carry out our Attack Plan and destroy to the best of our ability all resistance encountered."

At 0700 in Casablanca Harbor, five Vichy French submarines were preparing to stand out of the harbor to go on patrol. Merchantmen were beginning to load and unload their cargos, and on board the cruisers and destroyers the crews were at work scrubbing decks.

At 0730, Ranger launched her first strike of bombers with Grumman F4F Wildcat escorts. Ten minutes later they were intercepted by French fighters, and in a dogfight five American and seven French planes were shot down.

At 0804, as Ranger's bombers were releasing their loads, Massachusetts opened up with salvoes of her 16 inch guns on Casablanca's quays and ships. In the commercial harbor ten cargo and passenger ships were sunk in 10 minutes, 40 crew killed and 60 wounded. Alongside the breakwater three Vichy submarines went down at their moorings. Coastal artillery from El Hank and Oukacha returned fire along with the battleship Jean Bart, which only had one operating turret. Wreckage hurled aboard from the quayside landed down on the turret.

At 0900, the Vichy 2nd Light Cruiser Squadron under Rear-Admiral Gervais de Lafond raised sufficient steam to put to sea to head for Fedala. As his flagship Primauguet was undergoing minor engine repair, de Lafond hoisted his flag in the destroyer Milan. He steamed northwards at full speed hoping that the smoke and rising sun would blind the American naval forces. At 0920, Wildcats from Ranger strafed her decks. Every man on bridge, including Lafond, was wounded. The Vichy Boulonnais, was severely damaged. The commanding officer, Lieutenant Commander Martinant de Preneuf, was killed on Albatross. The Brestois' anti-aircraft battery was put out of action.

Primauguet was now off Fedala within range of Augusta, Brooklyn to the north and Massachusetts, Tuscaloosa and Wichita from the northeast. The first Vichy ship to sink was Fougueux, which was struck by shells from Massachusetts and Tuscaloosa. Milan, with her bow shattered and forward turret wrecked, beached. Boulonnais after being hit by eight 16-inch rounds while she was carrying out a torpedo run, turned turtle, and sunk with all hands. Primauguet, holed below her water line and with half of her engine room crew dead, dropped anchor near Milan. Brestois and Frondeur got back to harbor but capsized during the night. Finally, the destroyer Alcyon left harbor for survivors but was attacked by bombers and navy guns when she cleared the Casablanca breakwater. Albatross and Primauguet were hit again while trying to transfer 100 dead and 200 wounded.

For the next three days the Augusta was engaged in protecting the transport ships and the invasion troops, and combating enemy naval and coastal resistance. On 10 November 1942 the Augusta helped turn back the French units sortieing from Casablanca who were attempting to disrupt the landings. The ship's scout observation planes played an active role in spotting the accuracy of gun splashes from ship's gunfire against the enemy ships and coastal batteries. The Augusta was straddled by shells from Jean Bart, which had been earlier mistakenly reported to Hewitt to have been out of commission. Jean Bart was subsequently put out of action by return ship and carrier plane bombardment.

The invasion was successful and the ship and crew had the good fortune of being able to celebrate Thanksgiving Day 1942 with a special dinner with cuisine a la North Africa. A copy of the ship's program issued to the crew for that day is reproduced here. The message to the crew for that day summed up the feelings of all:

"In its five engagements, one against a shore battery and four against enemy naval forces, the ship rendered a good account of itself and contributed in a large degree to the final defeat of the opposing forces and the establishing of a second front, in North Africa. In the course of each engagement the ship was subjected to accurate and heavy fire by the opposing forces. And yet, although bracketed many times by the projectiles of the enemy, the ship miraculously escaped without damage to herself or injury to the crew. It should be apparent to all that consistent escape from harm was due not alone to skill, or to good luck, but unquestionably to the intervention of divine providence."

=== Morocco and Atlantic Duties ===
Arriving off Fedhala, French Morocco, on 7 November, Augusta went into general quarters at 2200. During the predawn hours of 8 November, the initial landings met with stiff opposition. At 0630, Augusta catapulted two Curtiss SOC scouting planes aloft, and at 0710, opened fire with her 8 inch (203 mm) guns at shore batteries. The nearby Brooklyn supported Augusta's barrage, dodging near misses from enemy guns. A brief lull at 0730 permitted Augusta to launch her remaining two Curtiss SOC Seagulls, but 10 minutes later the enemy guns opened up again; several near misses fell within 50 to 100 yards of Augusta, the whistle of oncoming shells plainly audible to those on her bridge.

Augusta shortly left at flank speed to intercept an enemy force of two light cruisers and four destroyers north of Casablanca. Closing the range at 0915, Augusta opened fire with her 8 inch (203 mm) battery on one enemy cruiser, barring the Vichy ships' passage and turning them back into Casablanca harbor by 0950. Augusta returned to her station to assist Brooklyn, firing on shore batteries. In the sortie of French ships from Casablanca harbor, destroyers Brestois and Boulonnais attempted a torpedo attack on Augusta and Brooklyn. Augusta's main battery gunfire sank the latter, and forced the other away in a damaged condition; she sank later that day. Other Vichy ships attempting to escape were forced back into the harbor by 1122, and firing ceased for a time. Around noon, Augusta turned back Primauguet's attempt to sortie, scoring an 8 inch (203 mm) hit on the French ship's turret 3. Vichy ships tried to sortie at 1305, only to be blocked and forced to retreat by 1350.

Augusta spent the following day, 9 November, patrolling south and southwest of the transport area off Casablanca, and continued that patrol through 10 November. At 1135 on that day, she opened fire with her 8 inch (203 mm) guns on an enemy destroyer, straddling her and forcing her to retreat. Ten minutes later, Augusta was unexpectedly taken under fire by Jean Bart, reportedly "gutted by fire" and harmless. Geysers of water from near-misses erupted about Augusta and drenched the cruiser with yellow-dyed spray, but American carrier planes bombed Jean Bart later in the day and silenced her for the remainder of the campaign.

A cease-fire agreement was signed by Allied forces with the French on 11 November, bringing the operation to an end, and opening Morocco to the Allies. Augusta departed on 20 November with TF 34, her part in the operation over. She touched at Bermuda on 26 November en route to Norfolk, arriving at the latter port four days later. There, Rear Admiral H. K. Hewitt left the ship, and TF 34 was dissolved. Augusta stood out of Norfolk on 9 December for extended overhaul at New York, during which time her antiaircraft battery was significantly improved. That period of yard work completed, Augusta proceeded to Newport, anchoring there on 15 February 1943.

Refresher training took Augusta to Casco Bay two days later. She conducted air operations with her four scouting planes off the coast of Maine, and on 24 March conducted experimental fragmentation test shots, operating with Ranger on 26 to 28 March. She concluded that part of her training with night illumination exercises on 30 March and night battle practice the next day.

Augusta stood out on 2 April with TF 22, flagship Ranger joining the formation on 4 April, and arrived at Little Placentia Harbor, Argentia, on 5 April. From 13 to 18 April, the heavy cruiser operated with Ranger, carried out antiaircraft practice on 22 April, and conducted flight operations with her own planes from 30 April to 1 May.

In company with TG 21.7, Augusta sailed on 6 May, under orders to escort RMS Queen Mary to New York. Augusta rendezvoused with the huge liner on 9 May, and after seeing her safely into the swept channel, moored at New York on 11 May. Her mission accomplished, the heavy cruiser returned to Argentia with her task group, arriving on 17 May, and engaged in further local operations through June.

Augusta closed TF 68 on 20 July and began escorting Convoy AT 54A across the submarine-infested Atlantic to the Clyde. After an uneventful passage, the convoy arrived at Greenock, Scotland, on 26 July, and Augusta continued as escort on the return voyage, relinquishing command as the convoy neared American waters, and proceeding with Hilary P. Jones to Argentia, arriving on 8 August. She left the next day with Hilary P. Jones for Halifax, Nova Scotia, to rejoin TF 22, reported for duty on 10 August, and departed on 11 August for Scapa Flow, in Orkney. The British Admiralty assumed operational control of the task force, renaming it TG 112.1, as the ships neared Scotland. Augusta moored at Scapa Flow on 19 August, reporting to the British Home Fleet the same day.

Augusta operated with units of the Home Fleet on 23 August and departed with London for Hvalfjörður, Iceland, arriving the next day. She acted as covering force for training exercises with London and Impulsive off Iceland from 2 to 10 October, and conducted gunnery training off Eyjafjörður, Iceland on 19 October.

While returning to Scapa Flow, Augusta fired on a passing German Junkers Ju 88 bomber at 1139 on 27 October, firing 14 rounds from her 5 inch (127 mm) battery until the plane passed out of range. She moored at Scapa Flow on 31 October, proceeding to Greenock two days later, and returned to Scapa Flow on 7 November.

On 22 November, she got underway with Ranger and other ships of the task force for Hvalfjörður, arriving two days later. Operational control passed to the United States Navy on 26 November when TF 68 stood out for Boston, Augusta mooring there on 3 December 1943. She remained there, undergoing repairs and alterations through the end of the year.

Repairs completed, Augusta departed Boston on 29 January 1944 and steamed to Casco Bay for post-overhaul training exercises. She participated in bombardment, radar, illumination, and tactical exercises with TF 22 off Maine, until steaming to Boston on 7 April for limited availability.

She left President Roads, Boston, and rendezvoused with convoy UT 11 the next day. However, she was soon detached from the convoy and escorted by Earle across the Atlantic to Belfast, Northern Ireland. Arriving on 15 April, she steamed thence to Plymouth, England, on 17 April. There, Rear Admiral Alan G. Kirk, Commander, TF 122, came on board on 25 April and broke his flag. At 1300 on 25 May, King George VI of the United Kingdom came on board to lunch with Admiral Kirk, and departed the same day.

=== Normandy ===
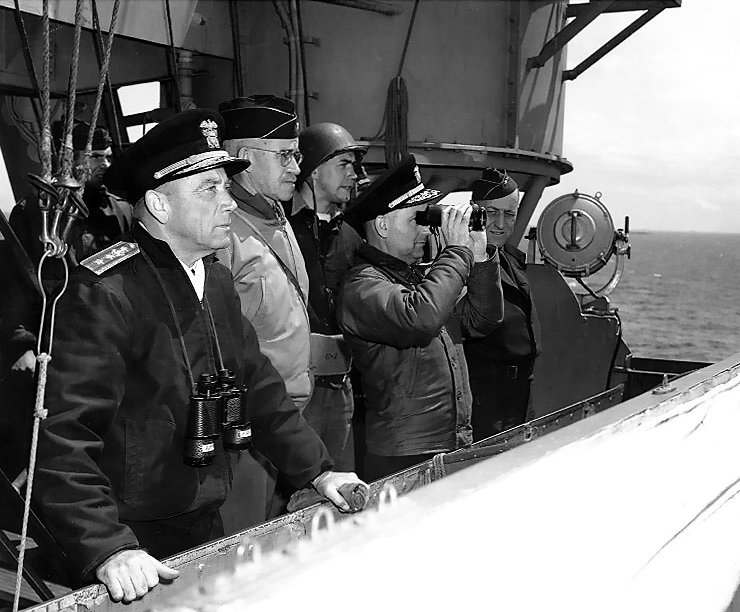
Senior officers watching operations from the bridge of USS Augusta (CA-31), off Normandy, June 8, 1944. They are (from left to right): Rear Admiral Alan G. Kirk, Lieutenant General Omar Bradley, Rear Admiral Arthur D. Struble (with binoculars), and Major General William B. Kean.

In June, Augusta took part in the Normandy invasion, standing out of Plymouth on 5 June with Lieutenant General Omar Bradley, USA, and his staff, embarked. Closing the shore on 6 June, the heavy cruiser commenced firing at 0618, hurling 51 rounds from her main battery at shore installations. VOS-7, a U.S Navy Spotter Squadron flying Supermarine Spitfire VBs and Supermarine Seafire IIIs, was one of the units which provided targeting coordinates and fire control. On 10 June General Bradley and his staff left the heavy cruiser to establish headquarters ashore. Augusta was bombed at 0357 on 11 June, but escaped damage as the bomb exploded 800 yards (730 m) off her port beam. The following day, anchored as before off Omaha Beach, she fired eight 5 inch (127 mm) rounds at an enemy plane at 2343, driving it off. On 13 June at 0352 she sent 21 rounds of 5 inch (127 mm) at a German plane, and shot it down. Augusta drove off other aircraft and bombarded the shore with her heavy guns on 15 June, and provided antiaircraft defense to the forces off Normandy on 18 June. The next day, while underway to shift berths, she lost a man overboard when he was swept overboard by heavy seas.

=== Operation Dragoon ===
Rear Admiral Kirk shifted his flag to Thompson on 1 July, and Augusta got underway the same day for Plymouth, mooring there on 2 July. Four days later, in company with TG 120.6, she departed for Mers el Kebir, Algeria, arriving there on 10 July, only to leave two days later with Hambleton for Palermo, Sicily. She moored at that port on 14 July and reported to TF 86 for duty. Rear Admiral Lyal A. Davidson came on board and broke his flag the same day, and Augusta stood out with Macomb and Hambleton for Naples, arriving the next day. She carried out shore bombardment exercises on 23 July.

She returned to Palermo on 27 July and steamed to Naples the following day. She continued her training until 12 August, when as flagship for TF 86, she carried Brigadier General Benjamin W. Chidlaw, USA, to Propriano, Corsica, arriving the following day.

On 14 August, the heavy cruiser departed the Golfe de Valinco at 1030 for Ile du Levant, southern France and the beginning of Operation "Dragoon". Augusta arrived at 2155 at the staging area, joining the Sitka Assault Group. On the morning of 15 August, Augusta trained her main battery against targets on Port Cros Island, and fired nine rounds. At 1125, she sent six.

Secretary of the Navy James Forrestal came on board at 2023 for an official visit with Admiral Davidson.

The next day, Augusta patrolled the Sitka Assault Area and Secretary Forrestal left her at 0850. The heavy cruiser fired 63 more rounds at the fort on Port Cros Island to soften it up. On 17 August, she patrolled with Omaha and poured 138 rounds from her 8 inch (203 mm) battery into the island fort, which surrendered that day. The following day, General Chidlaw left the ship to establish his headquarters on shore, and Augusta turned her fire on the remaining coastal defense batteries. She departed on 19 August for a reconnaissance-in-force of St. Mandrier Island off Toulon, France, where the battery known as "Big Willie" was located, bombarding shore installations, and returning to the Sitka Assault Area the same day. The Golfe Hotel, Hyeres, France, was nearly leveled by 114 rounds from Augusta on 20 August. Toulon and Marseille surrendered eight days later. On 29 August, a landing party drawn from the Marine detachments from Augusta and Philadelphia went ashore on the islands of Ratonneau and Chateau d'If in the harbor of Marseille and accepted the surrender of German forces on those islands, taking 730 prisoners.

In support of "Dragoon", Augusta had fired over 700 rounds of 8 inch (203 mm) projectiles, and had materially aided invading Allied forces. She steamed to the Gulf of San Tropez, France, on 30 August, where Admiral Davidson shifted his flag to Philadelphia, and Augusta was detached from TF 86.

=== Refit and Further Service ===
On 1 September, the heavy cruiser sailed via Propriano to Naples, where she joined Cruiser Division (CruDiv) 7. After calling at Oran, Algeria, on 6 September, Augusta, in company with Tuscaloosa, Fitch, and Murphy, stood out, bound for Philadelphia and an extensive overhaul. While undergoing these repairs and alterations, Augusta suffered an explosion of unknown origin on 20 November in her ice machine room, which killed three-yard workers and injured four crew members.

Her overhaul completed, Augusta departed Boston on 26 January 1945 with Rhind and Bainbridge, bound for Trinidad, tested her guns en route, and arrived on 31 January. In the first week of February, she conducted refresher training in the Gulf of Paria, Trinidad, polishing up on gunnery, night battle, radar, and antiaircraft techniques. She steamed to San Juan, Puerto Rico, calling there on 9 February. Sailing for the United States on 21 February, Augusta, along with Tillman, Herndon, and Satterlee, rendezvoused with Quincy and her screen on 24 February as that cruiser steamed back to the United States with President Roosevelt embarked, following the Yalta Conference.

After Augusta and her screen had covered the approach of the President to Hampton Roads, she underwent minor emergency repairs, remaining at Norfolk until 7 March when she steamed to Guantanamo Bay, Cuba, arriving there three days later. She trained off Trinidad and Curaçao until 7 April, when Chicago joined her.

Augusta returned to Norfolk on 10 April, and on 14 April, in accordance with orders from the Secretary of the Navy, half-masted her colors for a period of one month in honor of the late President Roosevelt. After a brief call at Annapolis, Maryland, she sailed north to Newport on 22 April to train 11 officers and 300 men from Columbus on a cruise. The ship conducted antiaircraft defense and other exercises in Long Island Sound until 27 April when she returned to Newport and disembarked the trainees.

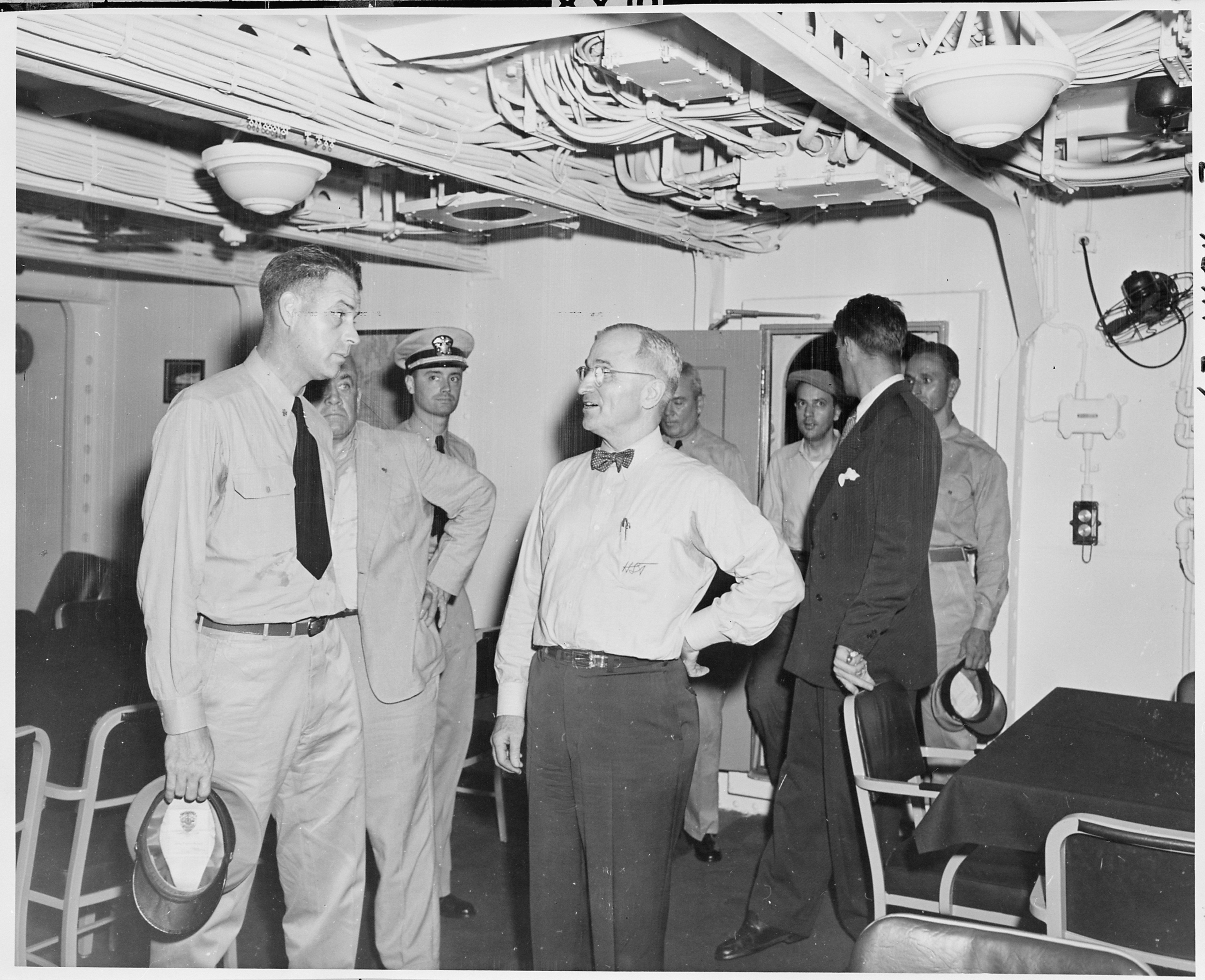
President Harry S. Truman tours Augusta, the ship that will take him to Europe to attend the Potsdam Conference in Germany. He and Commander C. L. Freeman are in the wardroom. (National Archives and Records Administration)

Three days later, Augusta sailed for New York, and arrived there on 1 May. On 7 May, in company with Decatur, she headed for Casco Bay, where the end of the war in Europe found her, and returned to New York on 2 June. On the 13th, Augusta got underway to proceed back to Norfolk. She then conducted further training exercises in Chesapeake Bay until 7 July, when President Harry S. Truman, Secretary of State James F. Byrnes, and Fleet Admiral William D. Leahy boarded her, and she stood out for Antwerp, Belgium, to carry her distinguished passengers on the first leg of their voyage to the Potsdam Conference. Met by a British escort, Augusta arrived on 14 July, and received dignitaries, including General Eisenhower. Her guests departed the same day, and Augusta got underway to proceed to Plymouth, arriving there on 28 July.

On 2 August, she embarked her distinguished passengers again, and received another visit from King George VI. Harry Truman was on the ship when he got the news that Hiroshima had been bombed by an atomic weapon. The ship then sailed for the United States, arriving at Newport on 7 August to disembark the President. A week later she moored in Casco bay. After carrying out training at Baltimore, Maryland, she arrived at Norfolk on 11 September, and conducted exercises off the Virginia Capes until steaming to Casco Bay again on 5 October for temporary duty under the direction of Commander, Operational Training Command, Atlantic, Commander TF 69. She then proceeded to New York, and participated in Navy Day observances on 27 October at New York City, where President Truman reviewed the fleet. Open to the public from 25 to 30 October, Augusta hosted 23,362 visitors.

=== Postwar ===
On 31 October, Augusta moored at the New York Naval Shipyard, to be modified for "Magic Carpet" operations, bringing home American servicemen from Europe. She performed this duty through the end of the year 1945. On 16 July 1946, Augusta was ultimately placed out of commission, in reserve, in a deferred disposal status at Philadelphia. She remained in the Philadelphia group of the Reserve Fleet until stricken from the Naval Vessel Register on 1 March 1959. She was sold for scrap on 9 November 1959 to Robert Benjamin of Panama City, Florida, and her hulk removed from naval custody on 2 March 1960.

== Honors and awards ==
- Combat Action Ribbon
- China Service Medal
- American Defense Service Medal with "A" device
- American Campaign Medal
- European–African–Middle Eastern Campaign Medal with three battle stars for World War II service
- World War II Victory Medal
- Navy Occupation Service Medal with "GERMANY" clasp

== See also ==
- Other ships named USS Augusta
