= 1830 New Hampshire gubernatorial election =

- March 9, 1830
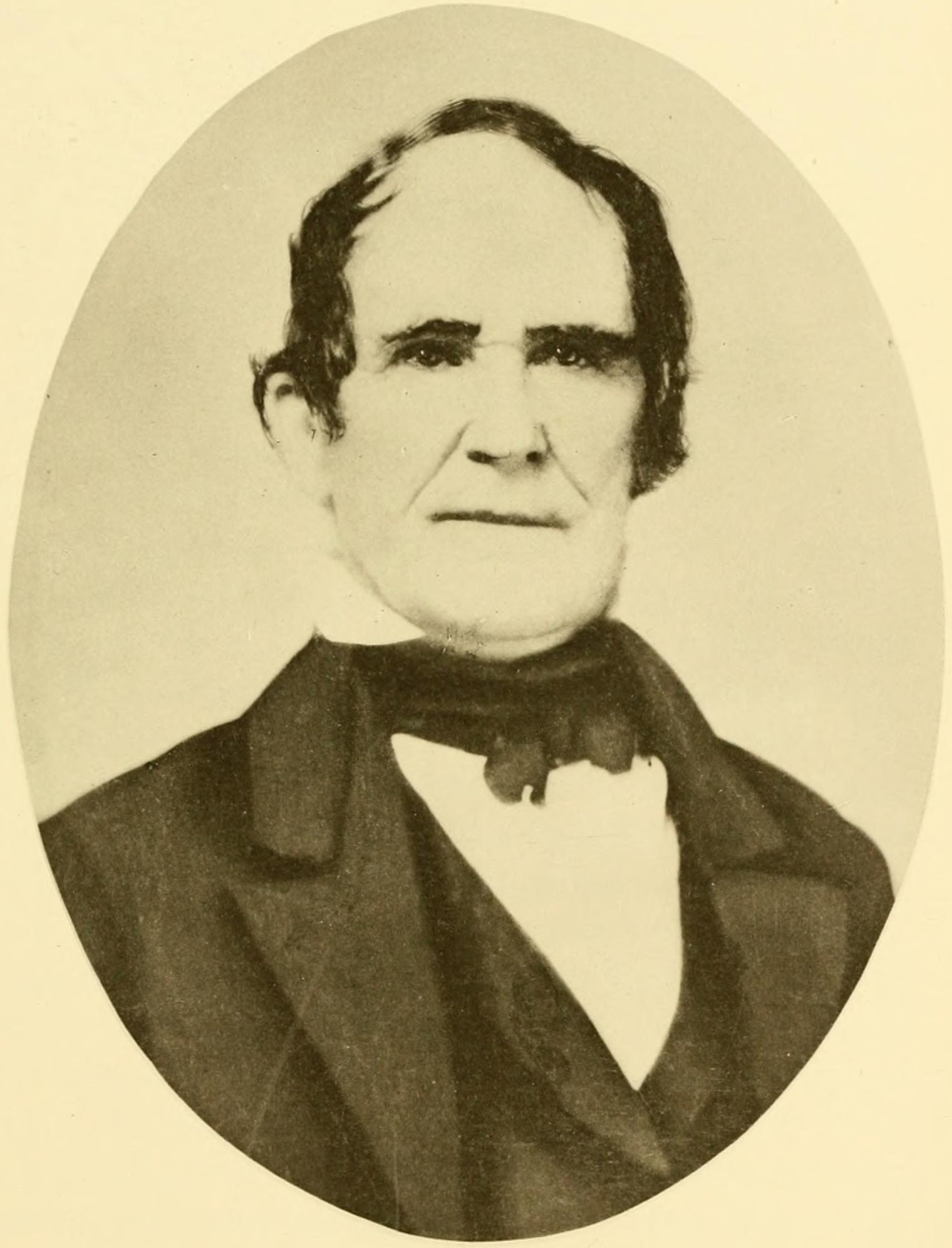

| Nominee | Matthew Harvey | Timothy Upham |
| Party | Democratic | National Republican |
| Popular vote | 23,214 | 19,040 |
| Percentage | 54.70% | 44.86% |
- County results Harvey: 50–60% 60–70% 70–80% Upham: 50–60% 60–70%
Governor before election
Benjamin Pierce
Democratic
Elected Governor
Matthew Harvey
Democratic

The 1830 New Hampshire gubernatorial election was held on March 9, 1830.

Incumbent Democratic Governor Benjamin Pierce did not stand for re-election.

Democratic nominee Matthew Harvey defeated National Republican nominee Timothy Upham with 54.70% of the vote.

== General election ==
=== Candidates ===
- Matthew Harvey, Democratic, former President of the New Hampshire Senate
- Timothy Upham, National Republican, member of the New Hampshire House of Representatives, former Collector of Customs at Portsmouth

=== Results ===
1830 New Hampshire gubernatorial election (Note: Some sources give slightly different results. The result given is taken from the New Hampshire Senate Journal.)
| Party | Candidate | Votes | % | ±% |
|---|---|---|---|---|
| Democratic | Matthew Harvey | 23,214 | 54.70% | |
| National Republican | Timothy Upham | 19,040 | 44.86% | |
| Scattering | | 187 | 0.44% | |
| Majority | | 4,174 | 9.84% | |
| Turnout | | 42,441 | | |
| Democratic hold | | Swing | | |
