= Nathaniel Gookin Upham =

American judge

Nathaniel Gookin Upham was a judge in Concord, New Hampshire. He served as an associate justice of the New Hampshire Supreme Court for ten years. He later became the President of the Concord Railroad. Late in his life, he served in the state legislature and occasionally called upon to mediate disputes between the United States and foreign nations.

== Biography ==
Nathaniel Gookin Upham was born on January 8, 1801, as the second child of Nathaniel Upham. The Gookin family were early settlers to the United States, first arriving in 1635. The elder Gookin was a prominent businessman who would later serve three terms in the United States House of Representatives. Nathaniel Gookin's elder brother was Thomas Cogswell Upham, who would become a distinguished professor at Bowdoin College.

Nathaniel Gookin Upham studied at Exeter Academy. He was accepted at Dartmouth College in 1816, where he graduating with honors in 1820. Upham returned to Rochester to study law under David Barker Jr. Upham was admitted to the bar and opened a law firm in Bristol. The practice was successful, and he moved it to Concord in 1829.

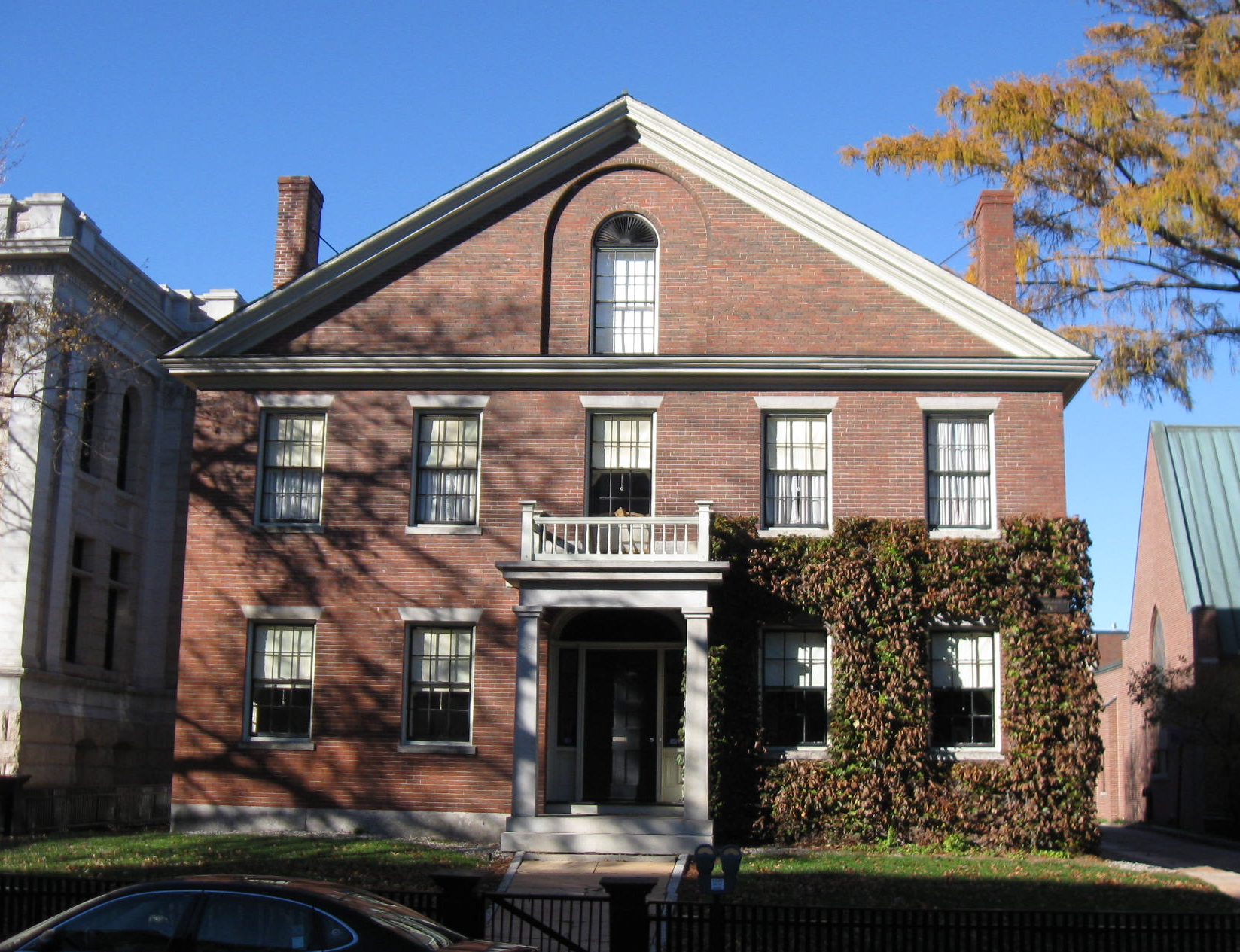
Upham lived most of his life in Concord, New Hampshire in this 1831 house.

In 1833, Upham was appointed an associate justice of the New Hampshire Supreme Court, replacing John Harris. At age thirty-two, Upham was the second-youngest man (after Levi Woodbury) that had ever been placed on the bench. Upham served in this role for ten years under Chief Justices William M. Richardson and Joel Parker. Upham resigned in 1843 due to declining health.

Soon after his resignation, Upham accepted a position as general superintendent of the Concord Railroad, a train line connecting Concord to the Boston and Lowell Railroad. He held the office, later renamed President, until 1866. He was part of the convention to amend the Constitution of New Hampshire in 1850. In 1862, Dartmouth bestowed an honorary Doctor of Laws degree to Upham.

In 1853, Upham was appointed as a representative of the United States to develop a treaty with Edmund Hornby of Great Britain. The treaty finalized disputed land claims between the two countries. In 1862, Upham was selected as arbiter for a boundary dispute between the US and the Republic of New Granada. Although he did not hold strong political beliefs, he was elected to the New Hampshire House of Representatives, where he served from 1865 to 1866.

Upham was plagued with poor health throughout his life. In 1869, Upham fell ill during a business excursion to Boston, Massachusetts. He completed his business and returned home, but became bed-ridden. On December 11, he died at the age of sixty-eight. His 1831 house in Concord, where he spent most of his life, was recognized by the National Park Service with a listing on the National Register of Historic Places on May 15, 1980.

=== Personal life ===
Upham had a great interest in history, particularly biography. He became a member of the New Hampshire Historical Society in 1833, and later serve three years as its president. Upham joined the New England Historic Genealogical Society in 1855. He was a member of the First Congregationalist Church in Concord from 1829 to 1837. He was a charter member of the South Church in 1837; when a fire destroyed the building in 1859, he helped raise funds for a new building.
