= USS R-18 =

R-class submarine of the United States

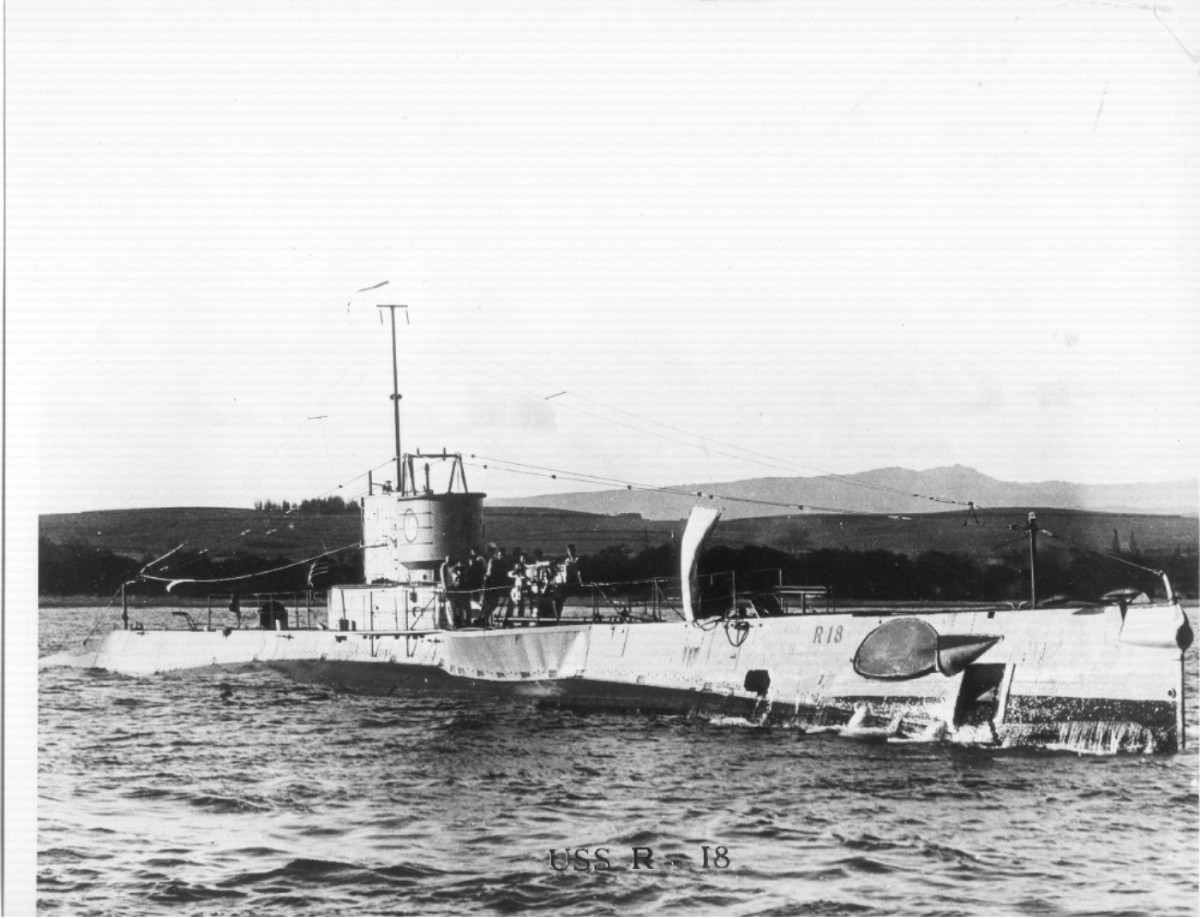
- USS R-18 at anchor at Pearl Harbor, October 1923, note the large black "O" painted on the submarine's fairwater for recognition

History

United States
- Name: R-18
- Ordered: 29 August 1916
- Builder: Union Iron Works, San Francisco, California
- Cost: $777,431.12 (hull and machinery)
- Laid down: 16 June 1917
- Launched: 8 January 1918
- Sponsored by: Miss Marion Soley Russell
- Commissioned: 11 September 1918
- Decommissioned: 13 May 1931
- Recommissioned: 8 January 1941
- Decommissioned: 19 September 1945
- Stricken: November 1945
- Identification: Hull symbol: SS-95 (17 July 1920); Call sign: NEGC
- Fate: Sold for scrapping, 4 September 1946

General characteristics
- Class & type: R-1-class submarine
- Displacement: 574 long tons (583 t) surfaced; 685 long tons (696 t) submerged
- Length: 186 feet 3 inches (56.77 m)
- Beam: 18 ft (5.5 m)
- Draft: 15 ft 6 in (4.72 m)
- Installed power: 880 brake horsepower (656 kW) diesel; 934 hp (696 kW) electric
- Propulsion: 2 × NELSECO 6-EB-14 diesel engines; 2 × Electro-Dynamic Company electric motors; 2 × 60-cell batteries; 2 × Propellers
- Speed: 12.5 knots (23.2 km/h; 14.4 mph) surfaced; 9.3 kn (17.2 km/h; 10.7 mph) submerged
- Range: 4,700 nautical miles (8,700 km; 5,400 mi) at 6.2 kn (11.5 km/h; 7.1 mph), 7,000 nmi (13,000 km; 8,100 mi) if fuel loaded into the main ballast tanks
- Test depth: 200 ft (61 m)
- Capacity: 18,880 US gallons (71,500 L; 15,720 imp gal) fuel
- Complement: 2 officers; 27 enlisted
- Armament: 4 × 21-inch (533 mm) torpedo tubes (8 torpedoes); 1 × 3-inch (76 mm)/50-caliber deck gun

USS R-18 (SS-95), also known as "Submarine No. 95", was an R-1-class coastal and harbor defense submarines of the United States Navy commissioned shortly before the end of World War I.

== Design ==
The R-boats built by the Fore River Shipbuilding Company, R-1 through R-14, and the Union Iron Works, R-15 through R-20, are sometimes considered a separate class, R-1-class, from those built by the Lake Torpedo Boat Company, R-21 through R-27, R-21-class.

The submarines had a length of 186 feet 3 inches (56.8 m) overall, a beam of 18 ft (5.5 m), and a mean draft of 15 ft 6 in (4.7 m). They displaced 574 long tons (583 t) on the surface and 685 long tons (696 t) submerged. The R-1-class submarines had a crew of 2 officers and 27 enlisted men. They had a diving depth of 200 ft (61.0 m).

For surface running, the boats were powered by two 440-brake-horsepower (328 kW) NELSECO 6-EB-14 diesel engines, each driving one propeller shaft. When submerged each propeller was driven by a 467-horsepower (348 kW) Electro-Dynamic Company electric motor. They could reach 12.5 knots (23.2 km/h; 14.4 mph) on the surface and 9.3 kn (17.2 km/h; 10.7 mph) underwater. On the surface, the R-1-class had a range of 4,700 nautical miles (8,700 km; 5,400 mi) at 6.2 kn (11.5 km/h; 7.1 mph), or 7,000 nmi (13,000 km; 8,100 mi) if fuel was loaded into their main ballast tanks.

The boats were armed with four 21-inch (533 mm) torpedo tubes in the bow. They carried four reloads, for a total of eight torpedoes. The R-1-class submarines were also armed with a single 3 in (76 mm)/50 caliber deck gun.

== Construction ==
R-18's keel was laid down on 16 June 1917, by the Union Iron Works, in San Francisco, California. She was launched on 8 January 1918, sponsored by Miss Marion Soley Russell, and commissioned on 11 September 1918, with future Rear Admiral, Lieutenant Commander Felix Gygax in command.

== Service history ==
=== 1918–1931 ===
USS R-18 at Honolulu Harbor

Following shakedown, R-18 was assigned, briefly, to the Panama Canal Zone. At the end of 1918, she returned to California. She was at San Pedro, California, from January to March 1919, then underwent an overhaul at San Francisco. On 17 June 1919 she got underway for the Territory of Hawaii, and on 25 June 1919, she arrived there at Pearl Harbor. Based there for over a decade, she served with the United States Pacific Fleet, training personnel and testing new submarine equipment.

When the US Navy adopted its hull classification system on 17 July 1920, she received the hull number SS-95.

R-18 departed Hawaii, on 12 December 1930, transited the Panama Canal, and thence continued on to the East Coast, for inactivation. She arrived at the Philadelphia Navy Yard, on 9 February 1931, she was decommissioned on 13 May 1931, and berthed at League Island until after the outbreak of World War II, in Europe.

=== 1941–1946 ===
Recommissioned on 8 January 1941, R-18 was at New London, Connecticut, for reconditioning and fitting out, into May 1941. On 12 May 1941, she got underway for the Panama Canal Zone, where she patrolled into September 1941. In October 1941, she returned to New London, underwent an overhaul, and then conducted training exercises in submarine warfare and anti-submarine warfare. In early January 1942, she shifted her training activities to the Casco Bay, Maine, area. Later in January 1942, she added patrols along a line between Nantucket Light and Bermuda, to her schedule.

Originally patrolling from New London, she shifted to Bermuda in May 1942. On 30 May 1942, a US Navy OS2U-2 Kingfisher floatplane mistook her for a German U-boat and dropped a depth charge on her as she crash dived in the Atlantic Ocean 50 nautical miles (93 km; 58 mi) bearing 50 degrees from Bermuda's Mount Hill Lighthouse. R-18 sustained no damage. In August 1942, she moved farther south, and until December 1942, operated in a training capacity in the Virgin Islands and at Trinidad.

Then assigned with other R-class submarines to training duties for the remainder of World War II, R-18 returned to New London, on 24 December 1942. She operated in the New London, and Portland, Maine, areas until June 1943. She was at Bermuda from July to December 1943. From January through March 1944, she was back in southern New England. In April 1944, she moved south for eight months at Key West, and Port Everglades, Florida.

In 1945, R-18 again began operations from New London. During the summer of 1945, she made her last voyage to Florida and back.

== Fate ==
In September 1945, she headed for New Hampshire, and inactivation. R-18 arrived at Portsmouth, on 7 September 1945, and was decommissioned on 19 September 1945. Struck from the Naval Vessel Register in October 1945, she was sold for scrapping to the John J. Duane Company, of Quincy, Massachusetts, in 1946.

== Bibliography ==
- "Table 21 - Ships on Navy List June 30, 1919". Congressional Serial Set. U.S. Government Printing Office: 770. 1921.
- Friedman, Norman (1995). U.S. Submarines Through 1945: An Illustrated Design History. Annapolis, Maryland: Naval Institute Press. ISBN 1-55750-263-3.
- Priolo, Gary. "R-18 (SS-95)". Navsource.net.
- Gardiner, Robert & Gray, Randal (1985). Conway's All the World's Fighting Ships 1906–1921. Annapolis, Maryland: Naval Institute Press. ISBN 0-85177-245-5.
- "R-18". Dictionary of American Naval Fighting Ships. Navy Department, Naval History and Heritage Command. This article incorporates text from this source, which is in the public domain.
- Hall, Anne Martin (1925). Ships of the United States navy and their sponsors, 1913-1923.
- Hinman, Charles R.; Campbell, Douglas E. (2019). The Submarine Has No Friends: Friendly Fire Incidents Involving U.S. Submarines During World War II. Syneca Research Group, Inc. ISBN 978-0-359-76906-3.
