= Nathaniel Upham =

American politician (1774–1829)

Member of the U.S. House of Representatives from New Hampshire's at-large district
- In office March 4, 1817 – March 4, 1823
- Preceded by: Jeduthun Wilcox
- Succeeded by: Thomas Whipple, Jr.

Member of the New Hampshire House of Representatives
- In office 1807–1809

Personal details
- Born: June 9, 1774 Deerfield, Province of New Hampshire, British America
- Died: July 10, 1829 (aged 55) Rochester, New Hampshire, U.S.
- Party: Democratic-Republican
- Spouse: Judith C Cogswell Upham
- Relations: Timothy (b)
- Children: Thomas Cogswell Upham; Nathaniel Gookin Upham; Hannah Elizabeth Upham; Albert G. Upham; Mary Cogswell Upham
- Profession: Merchant; Politician

Nathaniel Upham (June 9, 1774 – July 10, 1829) was an American politician and a United States representative from New Hampshire.

== Early life ==
Upham was born in Deerfield in the Province of New Hampshire on June 9, 1774, pursued classical studies and attended the Phillips Exeter Academy in Exeter in 1793. He engaged in mercantile pursuits at Gilmanton in 1794, at Deerfield in 1796, at Portsmouth in 1801, and at Rochester in 1802 and afterward.

== Career ==
Upham was a member of the New Hampshire House of Representatives 1807–1809. He was a governor's counselor in 1811 and 1812 and was elected as a Democratic-Republican to the Fifteenth Congress and reelected to the Sixteenth and Seventeenth Congresses (March 4, 1817 – March 3, 1823). He declined to be a candidate for renomination in 1822. After leaving Congress, he returned to Rochester, and became interested in educational work.

== Death ==
Upham died in Rochester on July 10, 1829.

== Family life ==
Upham descended from an early American family. The Uphams first came to the United States in 1635, when John Upham settled in Weymouth, Massachusetts. Nathaniel was one of two sons born six generations later to Rev. Timothy Upham, the pastor of the Congregationalist church in Deerfield, New Hampshire. His younger brother, Timothy, was a Lieutenant Colonel in the United States Army during the War of 1812.

Upham's eldest son was Thomas Cogswell Upham, a dominant figure in American academic psychology during the 19th century, a writer of devotional works, and a biographer of Madame Guyon. He second-eldest son was Nathaniel Gookin Upham, an Associate Justice of the New Hampshire Supreme Court and fellow state legislator. His daughter Mary married twice, first to David Barker Jr., and after she was widowed, she became the second wife of Eben Coe. With Coe she had two children including Thomas Upham Coe, a prominent doctor and lumber baron in Bangor, Maine. She was also a step-mother to Henry Willard Coe, Sr., a pioneer of California and the first to export hops from the area. His son is the namesake of the largest state park in Northern California: Henry W. Coe State Park.

U.S. House of Representatives
Preceded by Jeduthun Wilcox	Member of the U.S. House of Representatives from New Hampshire's at-large congressional district 1817-1823	Succeeded by Thomas Whipple, Jr.
