= John Harris (judge) =

American judge (1769–1845)

John Harris (October 13, 1769 – April 23, 1845) was a justice of the New Hampshire Supreme Court from 1823 to 1833.

Harris was born in Harvard, Massachusetts, to Deacon Richard and Lydia (Atherton) Harris. He graduated from Harvard College in 1791. Upon his graduation from college, he began his legal studies under Simeon Strong, of Amherst, and completed them under Timothy Bigelow of Groton, Massachusetts. He started practicing law in Hopkinton, New Hampshire, in 1794. He would serve as the postmaster of Hopkinton from 1810 to 1825 and was Judge of Probate for Hillsborough County from 1812 until 1823. In 1816 a commission as Justice of the Superior Court was tendered him, but he declined it. In 1817 he accepted the appointment of county solicitor, and acted under it for six years.

His wife Mary was the daughter of Eliphalet Poor of Hampstead, New Hampshire. They had four children, a son and three daughters, but no lineal descendant of Judge Harris survived his death.

Political offices
| Preceded by Levi Woodbury | Justice of the New Hampshire Supreme Court; 1823–1833 | Succeeded by Nathaniel Gookin Upham |
