= USS Upham =

Transport ship of the US Navy

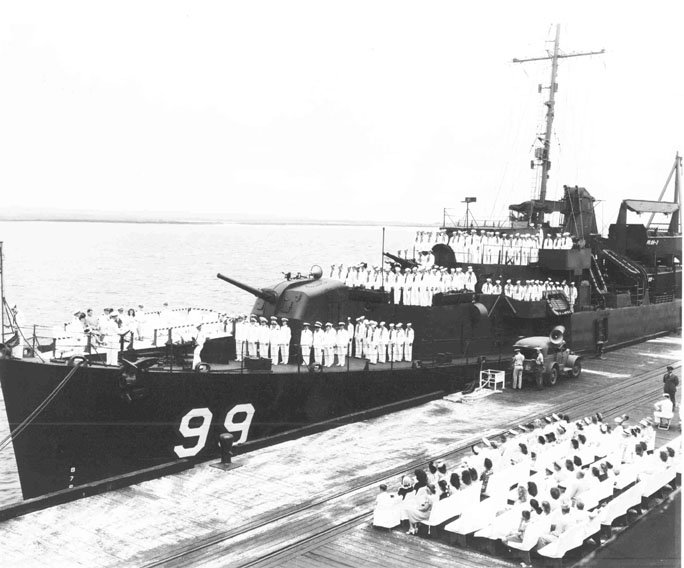
- USS Upham at her commissioning ceremony at Charleston Navy Yard, Charleston, South Carolina, on 23 July 1945

History

United States
- Name: USS Upham
- Namesake: Admiral Frank B. Upham (1872-1939), a U.S. Navy officer
- Builder: Charleston Navy Yard
- Laid down: 13 December 1943
- Launched: 9 March 1944
- Sponsored by: Mrs. Mabel Upham
- Commissioned: 23 July 1945
- Decommissioned: 25 April 1946
- Reclassified: From destroyer escort (DE-283) to high-speed transport (APD-99) 17 July 1944
- Stricken: 1 June 1960
- Fate: Sold to Colombia January 1962 for use as floating power station
- Notes: Laid down as Rudderow-class destroyer escort USS Upham (DE-283)

General characteristics
- Class & type: Crosley-class high speed transport
- Displacement: 2,130 long tons (2,164 t) full
- Length: 306 ft (93 m)
- Beam: 37 ft (11 m)
- Draft: 12 ft 7 in (3.84 m)
- Speed: 23 knots (43 km/h; 26 mph)
- Troops: 162
- Complement: 204
- Armament: 1 × 5 in (130 mm) gun; 6 × 40 mm guns; 6 × 20 mm guns; 2 × depth charge tracks

USS Upham (APD-99), ex-DE-283, was a United States Navy high-speed transport in commission from 1945 to 1946.

== Construction and commissioning ==
Upham was laid down as the Rudderow-class destroyer escort USS Upham (DE-283) on 13 December 1943 by the Charleston Navy Yard, and was launched on 9 March 1944, sponsored by Mrs. Mabel Upham, the widow of the ship's namesake, Admiral Frank B. Upham. The ship was reclassified as a Crosley-class high-speed transport and redesignated APD-99 on 17 July 1944. After conversion to her new role, she was commissioned on 23 July 1945.

== Service history ==
Upham conducted her shakedown training in Guantanamo Bay, Cuba, from 8 August 1945 to 10 September 1945; during the cruise, World War II came to an end with Japan's capitulation on 15 August 1945. Too late to participate in combat, Upham exercised with an operational training unit in the Chesapeake Bay until 5 October 1945. She then served a brief tour of training duty out of Miami, Florida, from 8 October 1945 to 22 October 1945.

Shifting north to Hampton Roads, Virginia, Upham reached Norfolk, Virginia, in time for Navy Day festivities before moving to Jacksonville, Florida, to prepare for inactivation.

== Decommissioning and disposal ==
Decommissioned on 25 April 1946, Upham was placed in the Atlantic Reserve Fleet group on the St. Johns River at Green Cove Springs, Florida. The ship remained inactive and was stricken from the Navy List on 1 June 1960.

Sold to the government of Colombia in January 1962, Upham was converted for service as a floating power station.
