= Thomas Cogswell Upham =

American poet and philosopher (1799–1872)

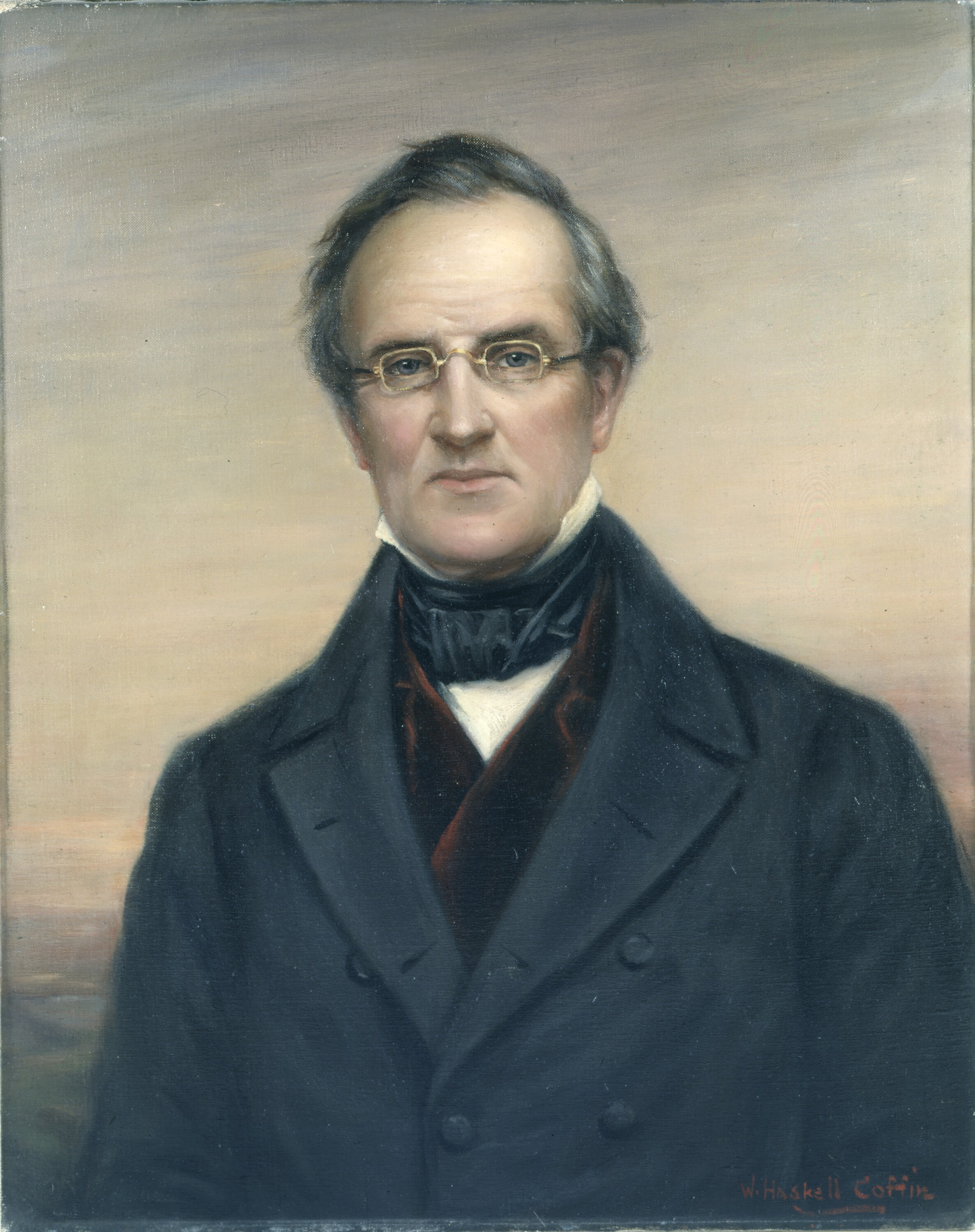
- portrait by W. Haskell Coffin, 1915
- Born: January 20, 1799; Rochester
- Died: April 2, 1872; New York City
- Occupations: Philosopher, writer
- Spouse: Phebe Lord Upham
- Father: Nathaniel Upham

Thomas Cogswell Upham (January 20, 1799 – April 2, 1872) was an American philosopher, psychologist, pacifist, poet, author, and educator. He was an important figure in the holiness movement. He became influential within psychology literature and served as the Bowdoin College professor of mental and moral philosophy from 1825-1868. His most popular work, Mental Philosophy received 57 editions over a 73-year period. Additionally, he produced a volume of 16 other books and the first treatise on abnormal psychology, as well as several other works on religious themes and figures. Specific teachings included a conception of mental faculties - one of these restoring the will to psychology be developing a tripartite division of mental phenomena into intellectual, sentient, and voluntary. The intellect subsumed sensation and perception, attention, habit, association, and memory as well as reasoning. Sensibilities included natural emotions and desires, such as appetites, propensities, and affections, and also moral emotions, such as a feeling of obligation. Finally, the last division was the will, which allowed for volition as a basic component of human nature. This positing of a will free to choose between desires and obligations reflected the author's own spiritual journey from a Calvinistic background to the Wesleyan holiness perspective. However, perhaps his most critical contribution to the field of psychology was Upham's concept of Positive psychology which asserts that there are fundamental, transcendent laws, and living in harmony with them is the key to mental and spiritual health. This concept laid the foundation for a healthy kind of religiosity, and a spiritually-based positive psychology.

Upham also had an influential relationship with Harriet Beecher Stowe while she resided in Brunswick. The Stowe and Upham families were close; Stowe described them as “delightful... such a perfect sweetness and quietude in all its movements... It is a beautiful pattern of a Christian family." Stowe and Upham frequently debated the abolitionist cause. Upham was a member of the Colonization Society, and while sympathetic to the anti-slavery cause, he believed that maintaining peace and obeying the law were more important. Stowe, a more fervent abolitionist, described an argument she had with Upham on the subject in a letter to her sister. She states that she and Professor Upham “had over the tea table the other night that sort of argument which consists in both sides saying over & over just what they said before, for any length of time—but when I asked him flatly if he would obey the law supposing a fugitive came to him Mrs. Upham laughed & he hemmed & hawed."

== Works ==
- Upham, Thomas C. (1822). American Sketches: Farmer's Fireside, a poem. Concord, N.H.: Hill and Moore.
- Upham, Thomas C. (1831). Elements of Mental Philosophy. Boston and Portland.
- Upham, Thomas C. (1836). The Manual of Peace, Embracing, I. Evils and Remedies of War; II. Suggestions on the Law of Nations, III. Considerations of a Congress of Nations. New York: Leavitt, Lord and Co.
- Upham, Thomas C. (1850). American Cottage Life, A Book of Poems. Boston: American Tract Society.
- Upham, Thomas C. (1858). Principles of Interior or Hidden Life (8th ed.). New York: Harper Bros.
- Upham, Thomas C. (1864). Life of Catharine Adorna. New York: Harper Bros. (biography of St. Catherine of Genoa)
- Upham, Thomas C. (1869). Mental Philosophy. Vol. 1. The Intellect. New York: Harper Bros.
- Upham, Thomas C. (1869). Mental Philosophy. Vol. 2. The Sensibilities and Will. New York: Harper Bros.
- Upham, Thomas C. (1877). Life and Religious Opinions and Experience of Madame Guyon. New York: Harper Bros.
