= Orin G. Murfin =

United States Navy admiral (1876–1956)

Orin Gould Murfin
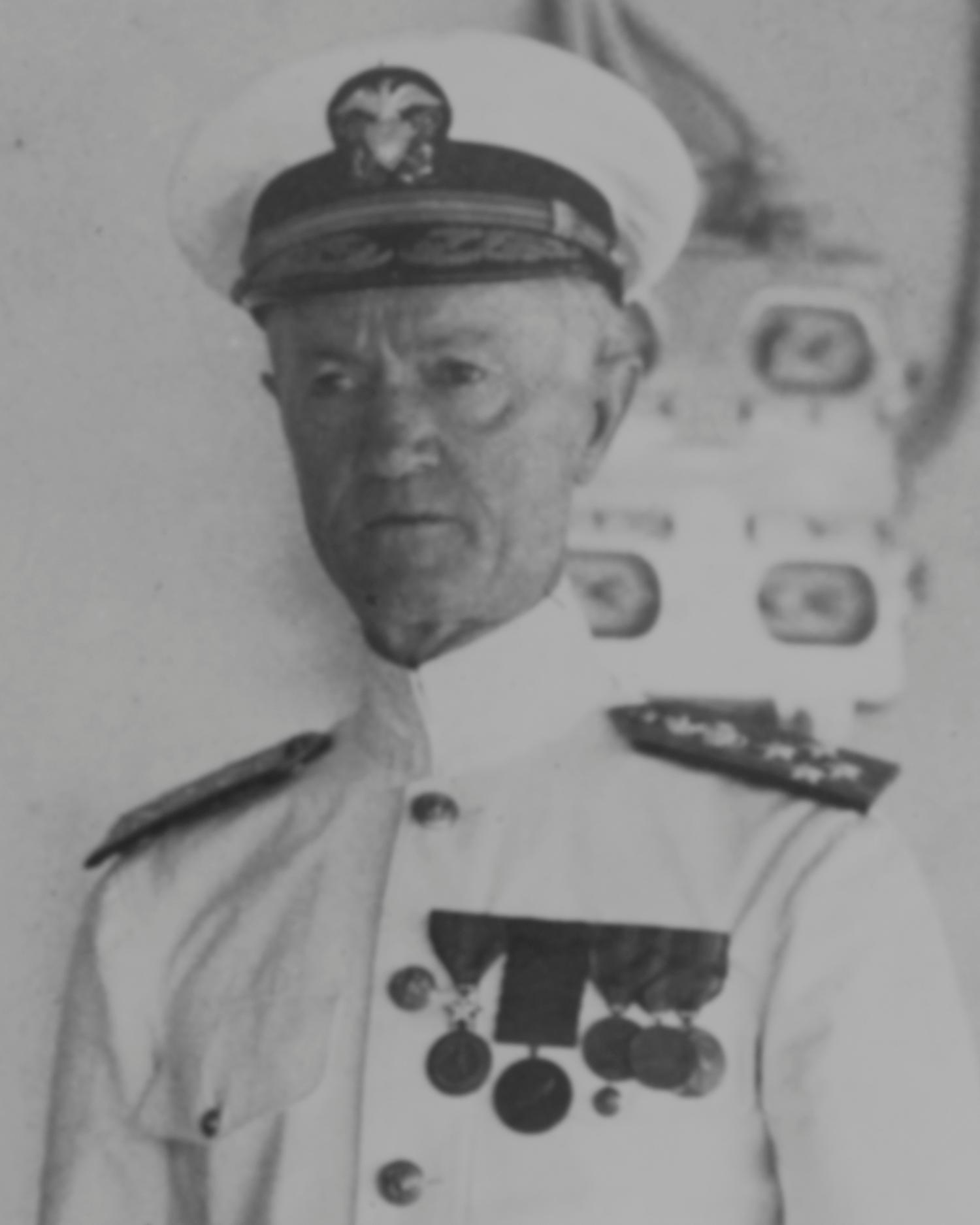
- Admiral Murfin circa 1935
- Born: April 13, 1876; Scioto County, Ohio, U.S.
- Died: October 22, 1956 (aged 80); San Diego, California, U.S.
- Military career
- Allegiance: United States of America
- Branch: United States Navy
- Service years: 1897–1940, 1944
- Rank: Admiral
- Commands: USS Albany; USS Concord; USS West Virginia; Asiatic Fleet
- Conflicts: Spanish–American War; World War I World War II
- Awards: Distinguished Service Medal

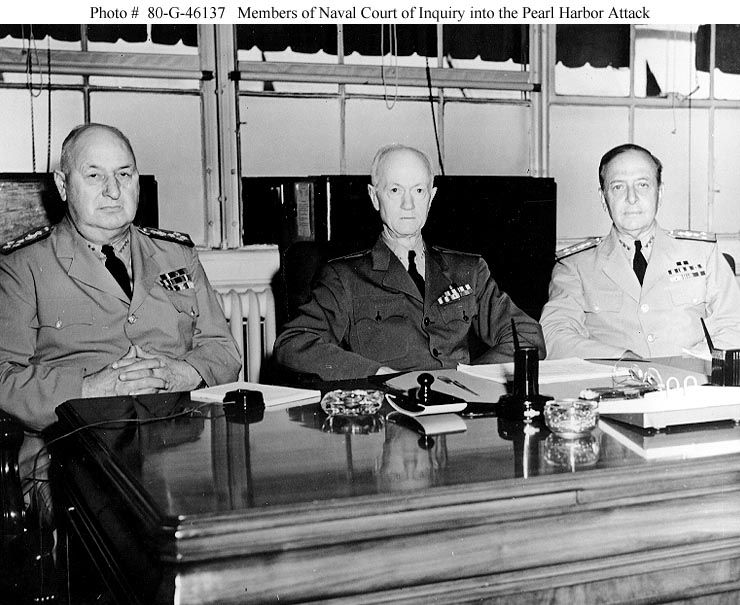
Admiral Orin G. Murfin (center) as President of the Navy Court of Inquiry for the Pearl Harbor attack

Orin Gould Murfin (April 13, 1876 – October 22, 1956) was an admiral in the United States Navy.

Murfin served as the commanding officer of USS Albany in 1916; Concord, 1923–1925; and West Virginia, 1928–29. During World War I, he supervised U.S. mine-laying bases in Scotland, for which he was subsequently awarded the Distinguished Service Medal. From 1931 to 1934, Murfin was the Navy's Judge Advocate General.

He also served as Commander-in-Chief, Asiatic Fleet, 1935–36. From there, Murfin became the commandant of the 14th Naval District, where he led the Navy's participation in the search for Amelia Earhart when her plane went missing in 1937.

Born in Scioto County, Ohio, Murfin received his early education in Jackson, Ohio. He then attended the United States Naval Academy, graduating in 1897. Murfin served aboard the battleship USS Iowa during the Spanish–American War. He retired from active duty in May 1940.

Following his retirement, Murfin served as the President of the Navy Court of Inquiry following the attack on Pearl Harbor. The court's conclusions were regarded as too lenient by Secretary of the Navy James V. Forrestal; see Edward C. Kalbfus.

Murfin and his wife Anna settled in Coronado, California, after his retirement. He died on October 22, 1956, at the Naval Hospital, Balboa Park in San Diego and was buried in Fort Rosecrans National Cemetery.

== See also ==
- List of United States Navy four-star admirals

Military offices
Preceded by Frank B. Upham	Commander-in-Chief, United States Asiatic Fleet; 4 October 1935–30 October 1936	Succeeded by Harry E. Yarnell
Preceded by David F. Sellers	Judge Advocate General of the Navy; 1931–1934	Succeeded by Claude C. Bloch
