= Timothy Upham =

- Born: September 9, 1783; Deerfield, New Hampshire
- Died: November 2, 1855 (aged 72); Charlestown, Massachusetts
- Military career
- Allegiance: United States of America
- Branch: United States Army
- Rank: Lieutenant Colonel U.S. Army; Major General of Militia
- Unit: 11th U.S. Infantry 21st U.S. Infantry
- Commands: 1st Division New Hampshire Militia
- Conflicts: War of 1812: Battle of Crysler's Farm; Siege of Fort Erie; Battle of Lundy's Lane

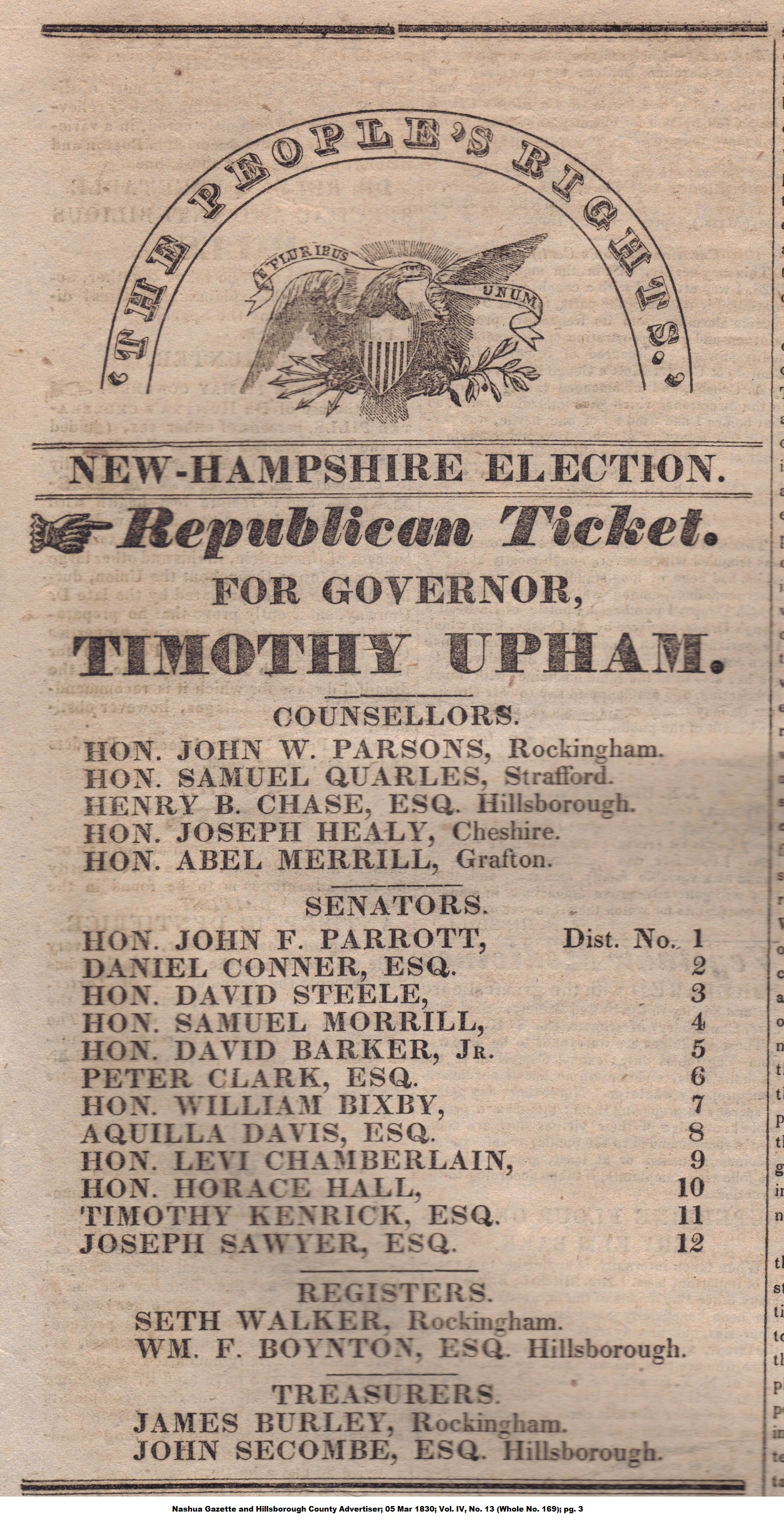
Nashua Gazette and Hillsborough County Advertiser; March 05, 1830; Vol. IV, No. 13 (Whole No. 169); pg. 3.

Timothy Upham (September 9, 1783 – November 2, 1855) was an American soldier in the War of 1812. At the Siege of Fort Erie he led the regiment under his command on a mission to rescue General Miller.

== Biography ==
Upham's father was Reverend Timothy Upham of Deerfield, New Hampshire. His mother was Hannah, the daughter of Reverend Nathaniel Gookin of North Hampton. Timothy Upham moved to Portsmouth, New Hampshire in 1807, and opened a store on Market Street.

In June 1811, Governor John Langdon appointed Upham as one of his aides, with the rank of lieutenant colonel. Upham continued in business as a merchant until 1812, when, in anticipation of a war with Great Britain, he was commissioned as major of the 11th U.S. Infantry on March 12. In June he was appointed by the new Governor William Plumer to command the detachment of troops from New Hampshire ordered to garrison Fort McClary.

In September, Upham joined his regiment at Plattsburgh, New York. Then on January 15, 1813, he was ordered to Portland, Maine as superintendent of the recruiting district of Maine. In the spring he was promoted to the lieutenant-colonelcy of the 21st Regiment, which was assigned to join Major General James Wilkinson's army in an attack on Montreal. The campaign ended with the American defeat in the Battle of Crysler's Farm on 11 November 1813. However, elements of the 21st Regiment and Upham in particular were credited with meritorious action in that affair.

During the Siege of Fort Erie in 1814, Upham and his regiment were sent by special order of General Jacob Brown on a mission to rescue General Miller. At the close of this campaign, his health impaired, Colonel Upham was reassigned to recruiting service.

At the close of the war Upham resigned his commission and was honorably discharged on June 15, 1815. In 1816 he was appointed Collector of Customs at Portsmouth, and he continued in that office for thirteen years. In 1819, he was appointed brigadier general of the 1st Brigade, 1st Division New Hampshire Militia, and in 1820 was promoted to major general of the Division upon the resignation of General Clement Storer. This office he resigned in 1823.

After leaving the Custom House in 1829, Upham again entered upon commercial pursuits. In 1830 he made an unsuccessful bid for the office of Governor of the State of New Hampshire, running on the Republican Party ticket and losing to Matthew Harvey. In the course of the campaign, an opposition newspaper accused Upham of misappropriating customs funds. Upham sued the publishers for libel; but after a lengthy trial, the jury was unable to find a verdict.

In 1841 he was appointed Navy Agent at Portsmouth by President Harrison. He soon resigned this office, and in 1845 removed to Charlestown, Massachusetts. His business pursuits were unsuccessful and, suffering poor health, Upham retired from active business.

Timothy Upham died in Charlestown on 2 November 1855. His remains were returned to Portsmouth where they were interred in the Proprietors Burying Ground.

Party political offices
Preceded by John Bell	National Republican nominee for Governor of New Hampshire; 1830	Succeeded by Ichabod Bartlett
