= Frank B. Upham =

US Navy admiral and Navy Cross recipient

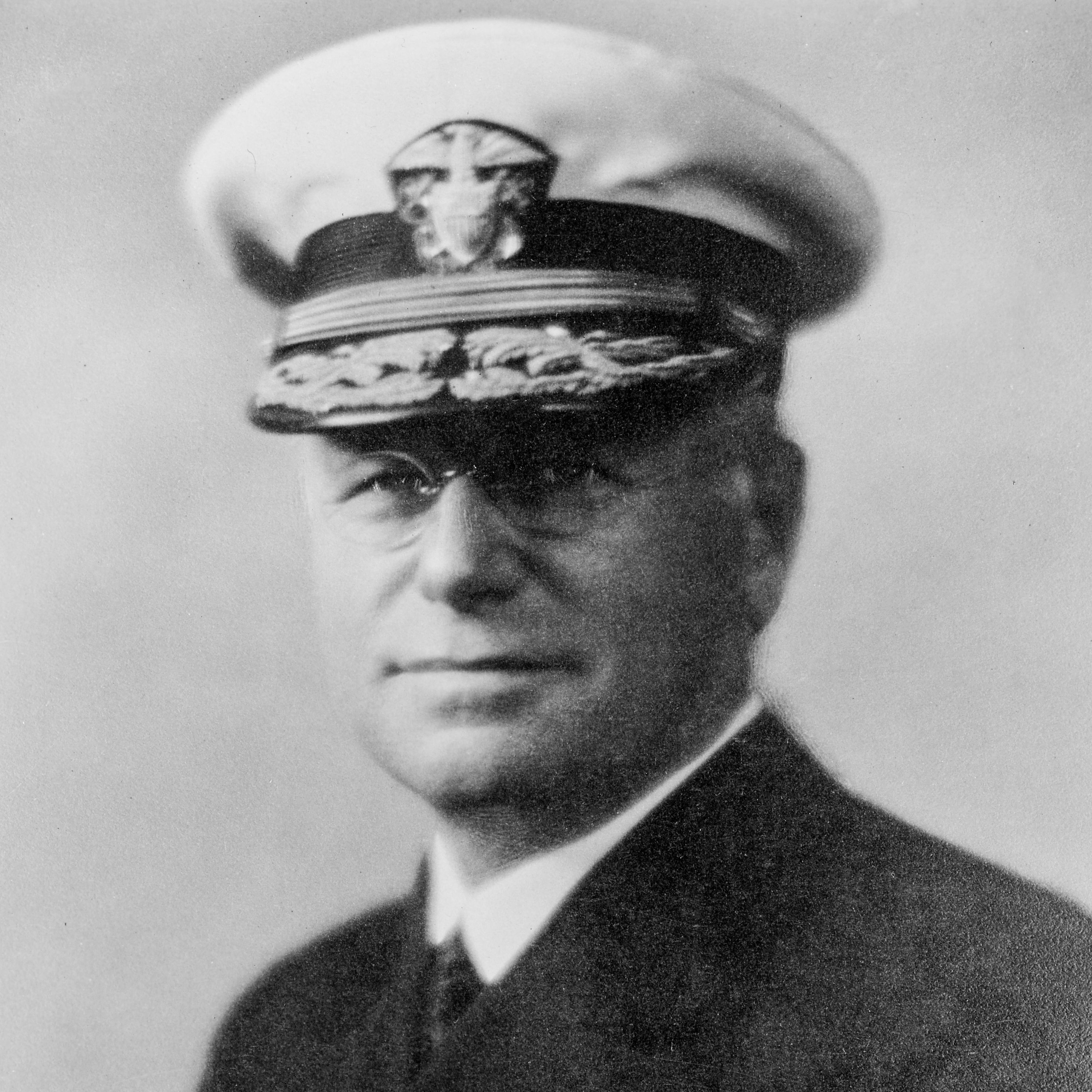
- Upham c. 1930 – c. 1939
- Born: September 7, 1872; Fort Apache, Arizona, U.S.
- Died: September 15, 1939 (aged 67); San Francisco, California, U.S.
- Military career
- Allegiance: United States of America
- Branch: United States Navy
- Service years: 1893–1936
- Rank: Admiral
- Commands: USS Columbia; USS Pueblo; USS Tennessee; Battleship Division 3; Chief, Bureau of Navigation; Asiatic Fleet
- Conflicts: Spanish–American War; World War I
- Awards: Navy Cross

Frank Brooks Upham (7 September 1872 – 15 September 1939) served in the United States Navy during the Spanish–American War and as an admiral during World War I.

== Biography ==
Born at Fort Apache, Arizona Territory Upham was appointed to the United States Naval Academy on 6 September 1889 and graduated on 2 June 1893. Following the completion of the two required years of postgraduate sea duty—which he served with the Pacific Squadron in the protected cruiser Philadelphia—Upham was commissioned an ensign on 1 July 1895 and joined the protected cruiser Olympia on 18 July before she sailed for the Far East to become the flagship of the Asiatic Squadron. At the time of the Spanish–American War, Upham was on the staff of the Commander in Chief, Asiatic Squadron, Commodore George Dewey; and the young officer received his baptism of fire during the Battle of Manila Bay.

He advanced up the officer ranks of the Navy, eventually attaining flag rank in 1927. During the years before World War I, Upham's sea duty embraced tours in the battleships Oregon, New Jersey, and South Dakota; he also commanded Olympia and the yacht Scorpion. He served tours of duty ashore at Newport, Rhode Island, at the Naval War College and in Washington at the Bureau of Ordnance. His overseas shore duty began in the summer of 1911, when he took up the duties of Assistant Naval Attache at Tokyo and Peking, shortly before the outbreak of the 1911 Revolution in October of that year.

During World War I, Upham commanded the cruisers Columbia and Pueblo and earned the Navy Cross for leading the latter during the "difficult, exacting, and hazardous" convoy escort missions across the Atlantic.

In the years following the armistice, Capt. Upham was chief of staff to the commander, Battleship Force, Atlantic Fleet—Rear Admiral Hilary P. Jones—before serving successive tours of shore duty: in Paris as naval attache and in Washington assigned to the Office of Naval Intelligence. He commanded the battleship Tennessee from September 1924-March 1926 and subsequently filled the billet of commandant of the naval air station at Pensacola, Florida. He capitalized on this assignment to earn his naval aviation observer's wings. Reaching flag rank in June 1927, Upham successively commanded Battleship Division 3 and Submarine Divisions, Control Force, and served as Chief of the Bureau of Navigation.

Given the temporary rank of admiral on 18 August 1933, Upham returned to the Far East as lllCommander in lllChief, Asiatic Fleet, and broke his flag in the heavy cruiser Augusta commanded by then-captain Chester W. Nimitz. Relieved by Admiral Orin G. Murfin in October 1935, Upham returned to the U.S. to serve as chairman of the General Board from 20 December 1935 to 30 September 1936.

Placed on the retired list on 1 October 1936, Rear Admiral Upham died in San Francisco, California. He was buried at Arlington National Cemetery.

== Namesake ==
- During World War II, the U.S. Navy destroyer escort USS Upham (DE-283) was named for Admiral Upham. She was converted during construction into the high-speed transport USS Upham (APD-99) and was in commission as such from 1945 to 1946.
- SS President Wilson was intend to be named USS Admiral F.B. Upham.

Military offices
| Preceded by Montgomery Taylor | Commander-in-Chief, United States Asiatic Fleet; 18 August 1933–4 October 1935 | Succeeded by Orin G. Murfin |
