= Bernard L. Austin =

United States Navy Vice Admiral

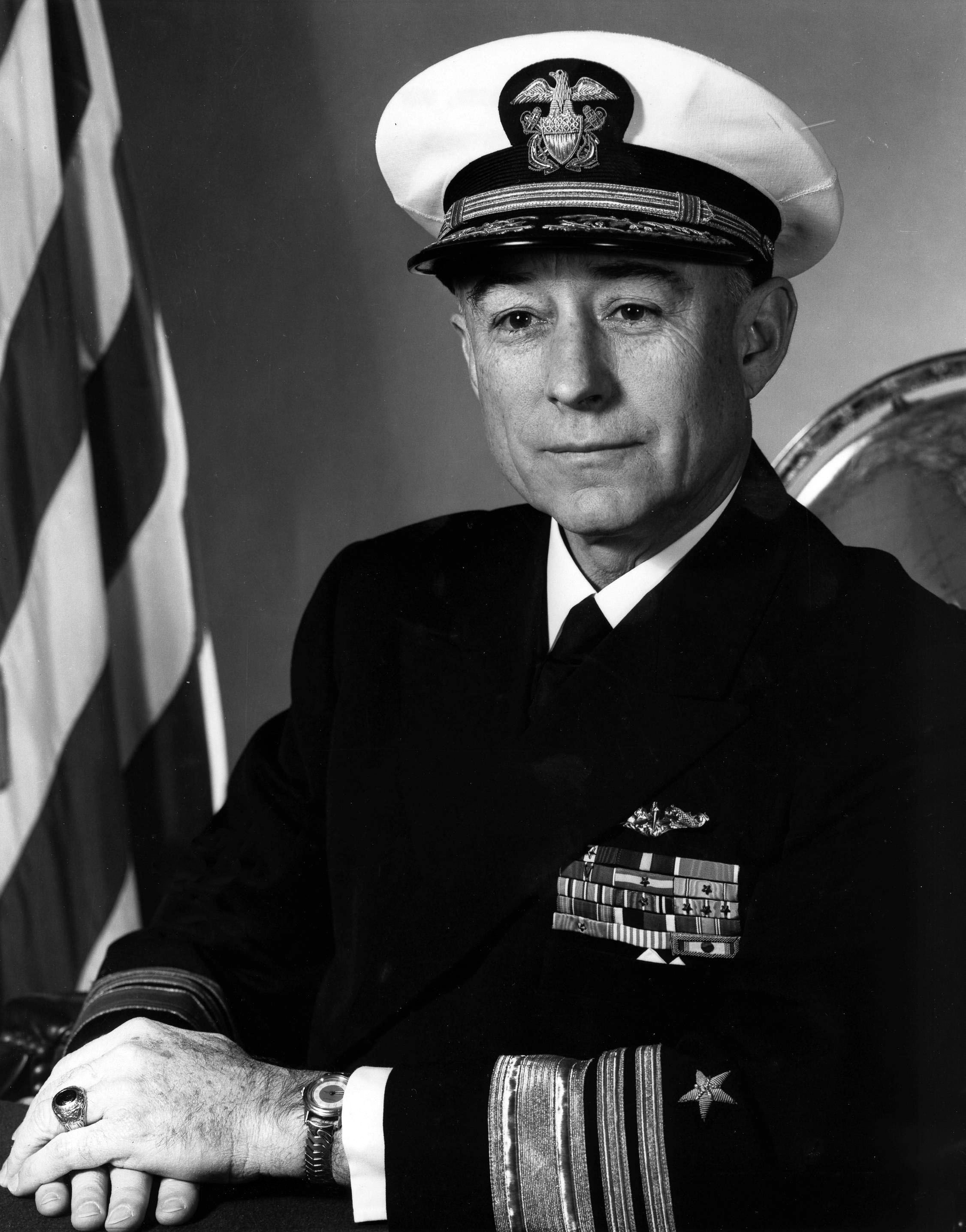
- Born: 15 December 1902; Wagener, South Carolina, U.S.
- Died: 21 September 1979 (aged 76); Bethesda, Maryland, U.S.
- Burial place: United States Naval Academy Cemetery, Annapolis, Maryland
- Military career
- Allegiance: United States of America
- Branch: United States Navy
- Service years: 1924–1967, 1968
- Rank: Vice Admiral
- Nickname: "Count"
- Commands: USS R-11 (SS-88); USS Woolsey (DD-437); USS Foote (DD-511); Destroyer Division 46; Destroyer Squadron 14; Destroyer Division 27; Service Squadron 1; Service Squadron 3; Cruiser Division 2; United States Second Fleet; Strike Fleet, Atlantic; Naval War College
- Conflicts: World War II; Battle of the Atlantic; Operation Torch; Pacific War; Solomon Islands Campaign; Battle of Empress Augusta Bay; Battle of Cape St. George; Korean War; Cold War
- Awards: Navy Cross (two awards); Silver Star Medal; Distinguished Service Medal; Legion of Merit with Valor device; Bronze Star with Combat "V"; Ribbon for the Presidential Unit Citation; American Defense Service Medal (two awards) with Fleet Clasp; European-African-Middle Eastern Campaign Medal (two awards); Asiatic-Pacific Campaign Medal (five awards); World War II Victory Medal; Navy Occupation Service Medal; Korean Service Medal; Republic of Korea Presidential Unit Citation; United Nations Medal; Inter-American Defense Board Medal; Cross of Naval Merit (Grand Officer), Distinctivo Blanco (Peru)

Bernard Lige Austin (15 December 1902 – 21 September 1979) was a Vice Admiral of the United States Navy. His career included service in World War II, the Korean War, and the Cold War and command of submarines and surface ship forces, during which he became a distinguished combat commander of destroyers. He also commanded the United States Second Fleet, held numerous diplomatic, educational, and administrative staff positions, and a served a lengthy tour of duty as President of the Naval War College.

== Naval career ==
Bernard Lige Austin was born on 15 December 1902 in Wagener, South Carolina, the son of Elijah Andrew Austin and Loula Ola Austin nee Gantt. He attended The Citadel in Charleston, South Carolina, from 1918 to 1920 before his appointment to the United States Naval Academy on 17 July 1920. As a midshipman, he participated in creating the U.S. Naval Academy yearbook, Lucky Bag. He was commissioned as an ensign upon graduation on 4 June 1924.

=== Early career ===
Austin's first assignment was to temporary duty at the Bureau of Ordnance at the United States Department of the Navy in Washington, D.C., during which he was under instruction at the Naval Gun Factory at the Washington Navy Yard in Washington, the Naval Proving Ground at Dahlgren, Virginia, and the Naval Powder Factory at Indian Head, Maryland. He completed this assignment in August 1924 and reported aboard the battleship USS New York (BB-34), upon which he served for two years. From July to December 1926, he underwent instruction at the Naval Torpedo Station at Newport, Rhode Island. He then trained until June 1927 on board the minesweeper USS Chewink (AM-39), which was the station ship at Submarine Base New London, Connecticut. In June 1927 he reported aboard the submarine USS R-10 (SS-87), based in Pearl Harbor, Territory of Hawaii. In June 1929, he transferred to the submarine USS R-6 (SS-83), serving on board her until May 1931.

During the next three years, Austin was an instructor in the Department of Electrical Engineering and Physics at the U.S. Naval Academy, teaching physics and chemistry. He returned to sea in May 1934 as the commanding officer of the submarine USS R-11 (SS-88), serving aboard her until June 1937 when he became executive officer of the presidential yacht USS Potomac (AG-25).

In December 1937, Austin became Press Relations Officer for the Department of the Navy. The position lent itself to his interest in oral communications and allowed him to develop it as a professional skill, and during his tour he delivered speeches written for him by United States Secretary of the Navy Charles Edison and Chief of Naval Operations Admiral Harold R. Stark. He also wrote articles on submarine warfare for Encyclopædia Britannica and the World Book Encyclopedia. Austin believed that this tour played a large role in his eventual achievement of flag rank.

Austin remained in the press relations assignment until August 1940, when he was sent to the United States Embassy in London, England, as deputy to Rear Admiral Robert L. Ghormley who, as Special Naval Observer there, was charged with negotiating the operational and technical details of cooperation between the Royal Navy and U.S. Navy in the event that the United States entered World War II. Austin was the only member of Ghormley's mission other than Ghormley himself to attend every meeting with the United Kingdom's political and naval leadership, including Winston Churchill and Admiral Sidney Bailey. During his tour at the embassy, the United States entered World War II on 7 December 1941.

=== World War II ===
==== Atlantic and North Africa ====
Austin became commanding officer of the destroyer USS Woolsey (DD-437) on 12 February 1942. A lieutenant commander by August 1942, he commanded her until December 1942. While he was in command, Woolsey operated in the Atlantic Ocean, escorting convoys from North America to Iceland, the British Isles, and Puerto Rico. She also took part in Operation Torch, the Allied amphibious invasion of North Africa in November 1942, by which time Austin was a commander. During Torch, Woolsey detected and assisted the destroyers USS Quick (DD-490) and USS Swanson (DD-443) in sinking the German submarine U-173 off Casablanca, French Morocco, on 16 November 1942. For meritorious achievement in command of Woolsey that day, Austin received the Bronze Star Medal with Combat Distinguishing Device “V.”

==== Pacific ====
On 22 December 1942, Austin assumed command of the newly commissioned destroyer USS Foote (DD-511), and took her to the Pacific Theater, where in May 1943 he became Commander, Destroyer Division 46, which along with Destroyer Division 45 made up Captain Arleigh Burke's Destroyer Squadron 23, the famed "Little Beavers." Seeing action in the Solomon Islands campaign, Austin – with the destroyer USS Spence (DD-512) as his flagship – commanded Destroyer Division 46 in two battles off Bougainville Island, the Battle of Empress Augusta Bay on 2 November 1943 and the Battle of Cape St. George on 25 November 1943. In recognition of his service in command of Destroyer Division 46 he was awarded the Navy Cross and, in lieu of a second Navy Cross, a Gold Star. He also received the Silver Star Medal for gallantry while in command during November 1943, and was awarded the Ribbon for the Presidential Unit Citation given to Destroyer Squadron 23 – the only destroyer squadron to receive a Presidential Unit Citation during World War II – for "extraordinary heroism in action against enemy Japanese forces during the Solomon Islands Campaign from November 1, 1943 to February 23, 1944."

In December 1943, Austin took command of Destroyer Squadron 14, with additional duty as Commander, Destroyer Division 27.

Promoted to commodore after his exploits in the Solomons, Austin became the youngest flag officer in the U.S. Navy at the time. On 15 April 1944 he became Assistant Chief of Staff for Operations and Training on the staff of Commander, Destroyers, United States Pacific Fleet. On 9 June 1944, he became Assistant Chief of Staff for Administration to the Commander-in-Chief, Pacific Fleet and Pacific Ocean Areas, Admiral Chester W. Nimitz, remaining in the position through the end of World War II in August 1945. He was awarded the Legion of Merit for his service during this assignment.

=== Post-World War II ===
On 25 October 1945, Austin was ordered to duty in the Office of the Chief of Naval Operations at the Department of the Navy in Washington, D.C.. In December 1945, he became Navy secretary of the State-War-Navy Coordinating Committee. Following this he became a member of the first class of the National War College at Fort Lesley J. McNair in Washington, D.C. In June 1947, he was detached to duty as the Special Assistant to the Assistant Chief of Naval Operations for Politico-Military Affairs at the Department of the Navy, serving in that position until October 1949. During this period, he performed a one-year special-duty assignment at the Office of the Naval Attaché, London, England, as a student at the British Imperial Defence College. completing his studies there in 1949.

In January 1950, Austin was designated Commander, Service Squadron 1. In July 1950, immediately after the outbreak of the Korean War, he was sent to the Western Pacific to organize Service Squadron 3 and command it in logistics operations in support of the United Nations combat effort in Korea. In May 1951 he was assigned to the International Affairs Division of the Office of the Chief of Naval Operations, serving as that division's assistant director until February 1952, when he was advanced to director, serving in that position until May 1954. During this tour he served as the first U.S. Navy member of the National Security Council staff. He then became Commander, Cruiser Division 2. In April 1955 he joined the staff of the Supreme Headquarters Allied Powers Europe (SHAPE).

On 15 March 1956, Austin was promoted to the rank of vice admiral and became Director of the Joint Staff for the Joint Chiefs of Staff in Washington, D.C., remaining in that position until 31 March 1958. In May 1958, he assumed command of the United States Second Fleet with additional duty as Commander, Strike Fleet, Atlantic. Beginning in March 1959, Austin served as Deputy Chief of Naval Operations (Plans and Policy).

On 30 June 1960, Austin became the 32nd President of the Naval War College at Newport, Rhode Island. He served as president until 31 July 1964, his four-year term being the longest presidency in the college's history at the time. During his presidency, he played a key role in creating the Naval Command College for senior foreign naval officers. He received a Gold Star in lieu of a second award of the Distinguished Service Medal for service during his college presidency, the citation saying that "Vice Admiral Austin drew upon his great wealth of wisdom and experience in a dedicated effort to enrich the postgraduate education of students at the Naval War College in the field of maritime strategy and its relationship to overall national and allied objectives and strategy” and praising his role in developing a program of annual conferences of presidents and directors of the war colleges of the Americas, saying they were "highly beneficial to professional and diplomatic relationships among the participants.? While at the war college, he served in 1963 as president of a board of inquiry looking into the 10 April 1963 loss of the submarine USS Thresher (SSN-593).

On 1 August 1964, Austin officially retired from the Navy as a vice admiral, but instead of entering retirement he was retained on active duty as chairman of the Inter-American Defense Board in Washington, D.C. He received a second Gold Star in lieu of a third award of the Distinguished Service Medal for his service on the board. He then was assigned to the Bureau of Naval Personnel at the Department of the Navy in August 1967, serving there until 17 October 1967, when he was released from active duty and entered retirement.

Ordered to return to active duty in June 1968, Austin was attached until 15 August 1968 and again from November to December 1968 to the staff of the Commander in Chief, United States Atlantic Fleet, to serve as president of a board of inquiry investigating the May 1968 disappearance of the submarine USS Scorpion (SSN-589) in the North Atlantic Ocean. He returned to retirement on 14 December 1968.

== Personal life ==
Austin married the former Isabella Murray Leith (d. 20 May 1983) in 1925. They had three daughters, Alexandra, Jane, and Leith.

== Death ==
Austin died on 21 September 1979 in Bethesda, Maryland. He is buried with his wife at the United States Naval Academy Cemetery.

== Awards ==
- Navy Cross with Gold Star
- Silver Star Medal
- Distinguished Service Medal
- Legion of Merit with Valor device
- Bronze Star with Combat "V"
- Presidential Unit Citation
- American Defense Service Medal (two awards) with Fleet Clasp
- European-African-Middle Eastern Campaign Medal (two awards)
- Asiatic–Pacific Campaign Medal (five awards)
- World War II Victory Medal
- Navy Occupation Service Medal
- Korean Service Medal
- Republic of Korea Presidential Unit Citation
- United Nations Medal
- Inter-American Defense Board Medal

== Gallery ==
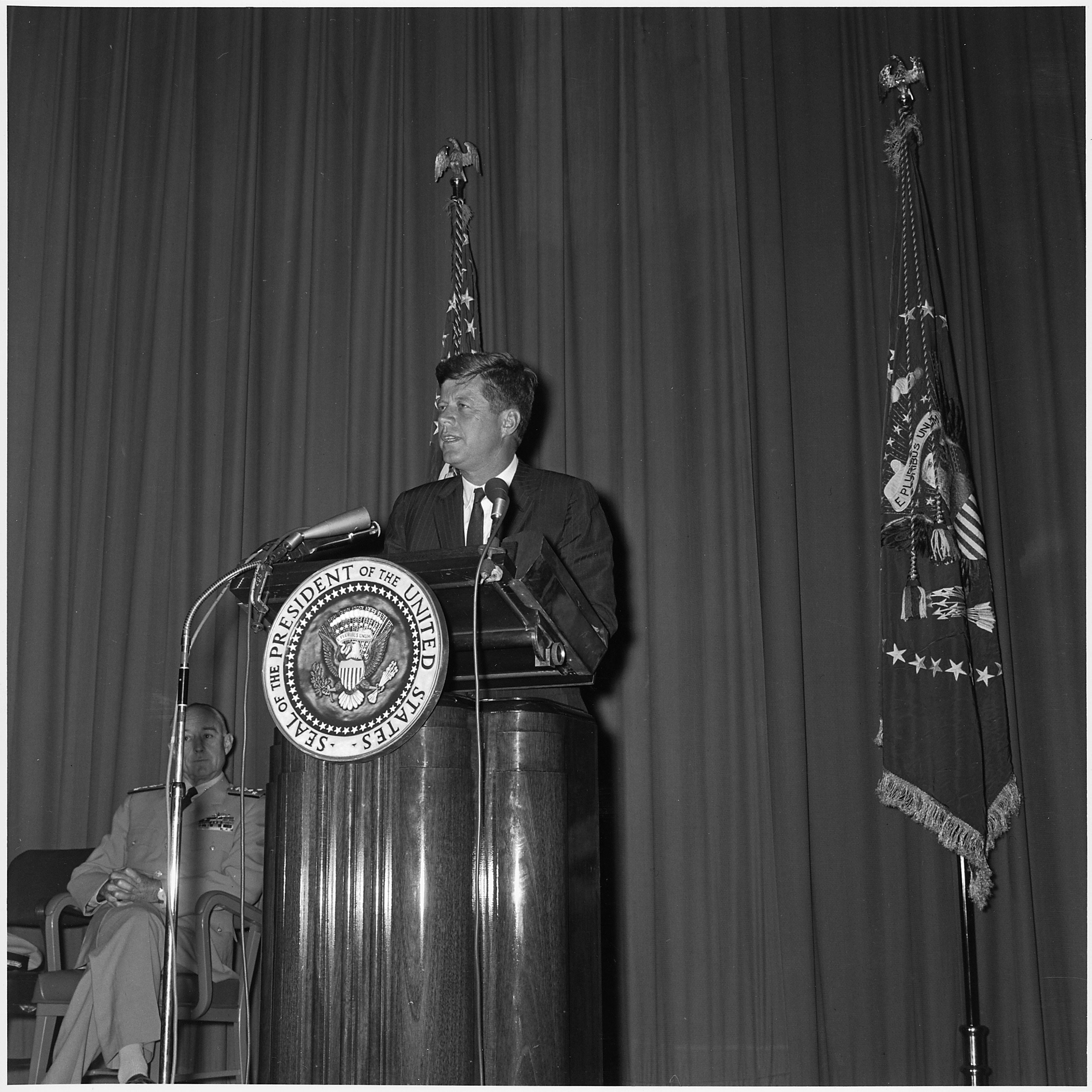
Austin (left) listens to President John F. Kennedy speak at the Naval War College on 27 September 1961.

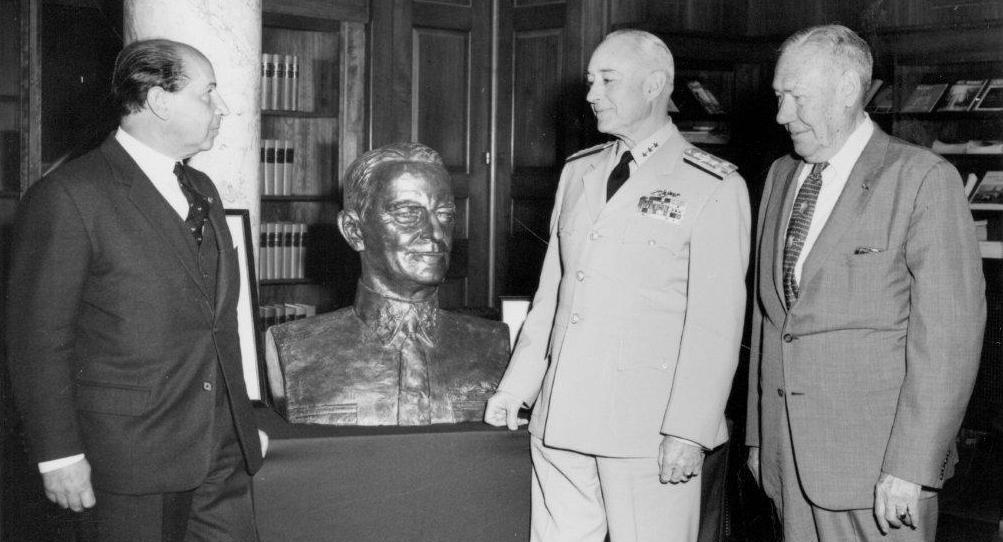
Sculptor Felix de Weldon (left) presents his bust of Fleet Admiral Chester W. Nimitz to the Naval War College on 5 June 1964. Austin (center) and retired U.S. Marine Corps Lieutenant General Keller E. Rockey (right) look on.

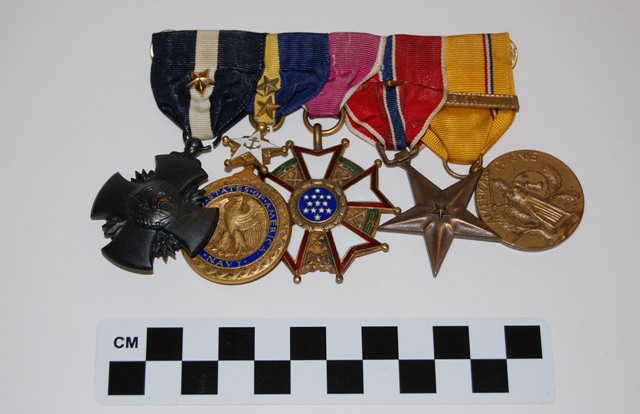
Bar of medals worn by Austin, now in the collection of the Naval War College Museum

== Attribution ==
- This article includes public domain text from "Papers of Vice Admiral Bernard L. Austin 1943-1967" at the Naval History and Heritage Command Web site

Military offices
Preceded by Stuart H. Ingersoll	President of the Naval War College; 30 June 1960–31 July 1964	Succeeded by Charles L. Melson
