= Quickly (disambiguation) =

Quickly is one of the largest tapioca milk tea franchises in the world.

Quickly may also refer to:

- Mistress Quickly, two characters in plays by William Shakespeare
- Tommy Quickly (born 1943), Liverpool rock and roll singer
- Quickly (software), a developed by Canonical to make building of new apps easier
- NSU Quickly, a moped manufactured by NSU Motorenwerke AG of Germany from 1953 to 1963.
- quickly, quickly (born 2000), American musician and record producer

== See also ==
- Quick (disambiguation)
- Quicken
- Quickening (disambiguation)
- Quickie (disambiguation)
