= USS Wilkes (DD-441) =

Gleaves-class destroyer

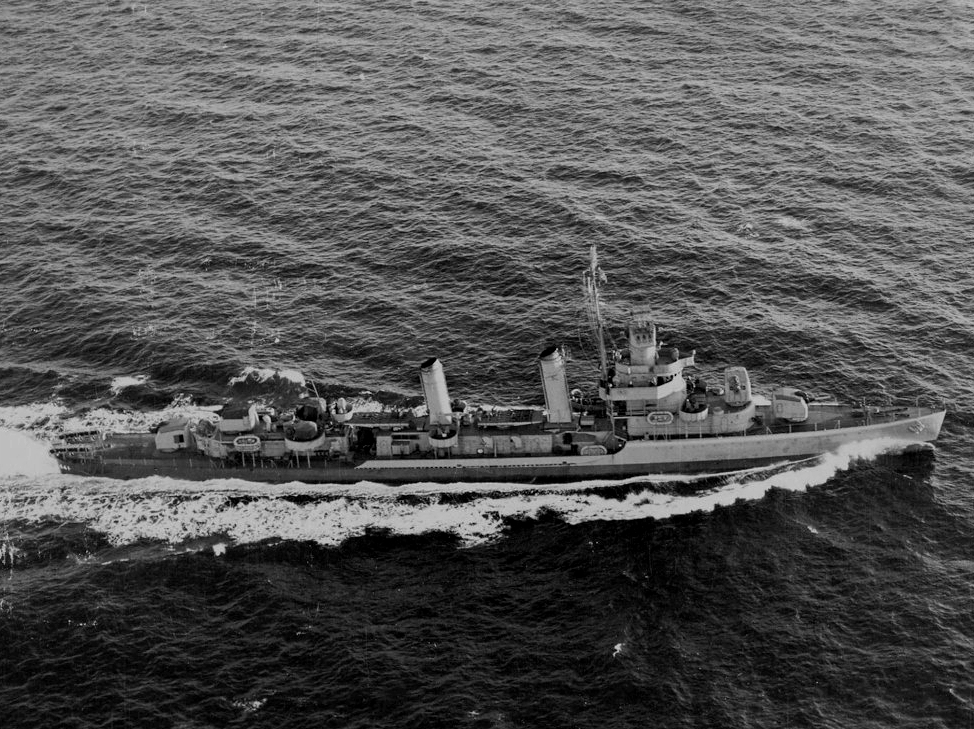
- USS Wilkes (DD-441) underway in May 1943.

History

United States
- Name: Wilkes
- Namesake: Charles Wilkes
- Builder: Boston Navy Yard
- Laid down: 1 November 1939
- Launched: 31 May 1940
- Commissioned: 22 April 1941
- Decommissioned: 4 March 1946
- Stricken: 16 September 1968
- Fate: Sold for scrap, 29 June 1972

General characteristics
- Class & type: Gleaves-class destroyer
- Displacement: 1,630 tons
- Length: 348 ft 3 in (106.15 m)
- Beam: 36 ft 1 in (11.00 m)
- Draft: 11 ft 10 in (3.61 m)
- Propulsion: 50,000 shp (37,000 kW); 4 boilers; 2 propellers
- Speed: 37.4 knots (69 km/h)
- Range: 6,500 nmi (12,000 km; 7,500 mi) at 12 kn (22 km/h; 14 mph)
- Complement: 16 officers, 260 enlisted
- Armament: 5 × 5 in (127 mm) DP guns, 6 × 0.5 in (12.7 mm) guns, 6 × 20 mm AA guns, 10 × 21 in (533 mm) torpedo tubes, 2 × depth charge tracks

USS Wilkes (DD-441) was a Gleaves-class destroyer commissioned in the United States Navy from 1941 to 1946. After spending several decades in the reserve fleet, the destroyer was scrapped in 1972.

== History ==
=== Construction ===
Wilkes was the third ship of the U.S. Navy to be named for Charles Wilkes, who was an American naval officer and explorer. She was laid down on 1 November 1939 by the Boston Navy Yard, launched on 31 May 1940; sponsored by Mrs. Bessie Wilkes Styer; and commissioned on 22 April 1941.

=== Initial operations ===
Wilkes was ready for sea on 1 June 1941 and then conducted shakedown training off the New England coast. The destroyer arrived in Bermuda on 24 August and helped to screen the battleships North Carolina and Washington on their shakedown cruises in the Caribbean. She departed Bermuda on 9 September and, two days later, arrived back in Boston for a brief availability, setting sail on 25 September for Guantanamo Bay, Cuba, and four days of training. Wilkes left Cuban waters and, on 2 October, arrived at Hampton Roads, Virginia, three days later. During the remainder of October, Wilkes visited Gravesend Bay, New York, Casco Bay, Maine; and Provincetown, Massachusetts.

On 2 November, the destroyer arrived at NS Argentia, Newfoundland, briefly escorted Yukon, and made rendezvous with Salinas, which had just survived two torpedo hits, and escorted the damaged oiler to Cape Sable, Nova Scotia.

On 28 November, Wilkes departed Cape Sable escorting Convoy HX 162. During the destroyer's passage to Iceland, Japanese naval aircraft attacked the Pacific Fleet's base at Pearl Harbor, pushing the United States into full participation in World War II. The convoy reached its destination the next day, and Wilkes spent the rest of December escorting convoys from Argentia, Newfoundland, to Hvalfjörður and Reykjavík, Iceland. Wilkes returned to Boston where she refueled, took on provisions, and remained through the holiday season.

=== 1942 ===
On 1 January 1942, the destroyer got underway and the following day arrived at Casco Bay, Maine, where she conducted exercise runs. On 5 January, Wilkes departed Casco Bay in company with Madison, Roper, and Sturtevant, bound for Naval Station Argentia, Newfoundland. She arrived two days later and, on the 10th, made rendezvous with Convoy HX 169, accompanying it for the next eight days. On 18 January, she was relieved as escort, and she set course for Northern Ireland with Madison, Roper, and Sturtevant. Three days later, she moored at Derry. On 25 January, Wilkes got underway and soon made contact with Convoy ON 59, taking station and relieving the British escort vessels. She arrived at Boston on 8 February, requiring docking.

On 12 February 1942, Wilkes received orders to depart Boston on 15 February and to proceed to Casco Bay, Maine, on a routine "milk run" in company with Truxtun and to join Pollux en route. Truxtun was delayed, so Wilkes went ahead and met Pollux according to schedule on 15 February; Truxtun joined up the following day.

While en route to Argentia, Newfoundland, at about 03:50 on 18 February 1942, Wilkes's commanding officer was awakened by the navigator and informed that the ship was believed to be northward of the plotted track. Visibility was poor, and weather conditions prevented obtaining radio direction finder bearings. Continuous depth soundings were taken, and all were in excess of 30 fathoms (55 m) except one sounding of 15 fathoms (27 m) which was obtained just prior to grounding. The signal, "Emergency stop", to warn the other vessels was immediately given by searchlight, and the message. "Wilkes aground do not know which side" was broadcast on the TBS. The words, "Wilkes aground", were also broadcast on the distress frequency. However, no message was received from Pollux or Truxtun until after these ships had also grounded. Wilkes found herself stranded to port of Pollux, Truxtun to starboard. About 07:00, Wilkes succeeded in backing clear of the beach. After seeing that Pollux had received help from George E. Badger, she left the scene. However, Pollux and Truxtun were totally lost, along with the 205 men who went down with them. The casualty list from the two lost ships was the Atlantic Fleet's largest list of the war up to that time.

No deaths occurred on Wilkes. She remained at Argentia for six days before beginning a voyage to Boston for repairs.

On 1 April 1942, Wilkes was assigned to Task Force 21 (TF 21) at the Boston Navy Yard where she conducted post repair trials and underwent a three-day availability. On 6 April, Wilkes got underway for Casco Bay, Maine, escorting Augusta.

On 8 April, the destroyer sighted the British oil tanker SS Davila. One minute later, the two ships collided — Davila's bow struck Wilkes on the port side abreast of her number one fireroom. After the two ships separated, the destroyer returned to Boston where she entered the navy yard for restricted availability which continued until 3 June. The next day, she conducted post-repair trials.

Following gunnery and antiaircraft practice and antisubmarine exercises at Casco Bay, Wilkes made a short escort mission screening Convoy BX-26. Three days later, she got underway for New York in company with Buck and Swanson arrived the following day, and anchored at the New York Navy Yard. On 1 July 1942, the destroyer sailed for Little Placentia Harbor, Newfoundland, where she performed escort and patrol duty before returning to New York where she remained until the 12th.

The next day, Wilkes got underway and joined Convoy AS-4, nine ships of American, British, Norwegian, and Dutch registry. On the 16th, the second ship of the first column of the convoy, SS Fairport was torpedoed forward and aft and sank. Survivors got clear in four boats and several rafts. Kearny made depth charge attacks and rescued the survivors while Wilkes continued a sound search and released nine depth charges with no visible results.

At 16:00 on 17 July, the destroyer made an underwater sound contact. Three minutes later, she delivered a modified "intermediate depth charge attack." Large amounts of air were seen to emerge at the scene of the attack in the center of which appeared the bow of a submarine, which then rolled over and disappeared, apparently out of control. At 16:14, Wilkes delivered a deep attack, including three 600-pound charges at the scene of the air blows. More air broke the surface, and the whole area was covered with dark brown liquid and oil.

Three days later, Wilkes was detached from the formation and proceeded to Trinidad, where she refueled before sailing for the Virginia capes and arrived at Norfolk on 25 July. The destroyer then made two coastal runs to New York before getting underway from that port on 19 August and steaming for Halifax harbor, Nova Scotia, where she arrived on 21 August. She remained moored off Greenoch until 5 September. At that time, she proceeded to sea to escort USAT Siboney to New York. She then spent the remainder of September conducting various exercises in Casco Bay, Maine.

Wilkes sailed for Virginia on 30 September 1942 and, two days later, arrived at Hampton Roads. For the greater part of October, the destroyer conducted various drills and maneuvers, including amphibious operations with TF 33. On 24 October, Wilkes got underway from Norfolk and took station in a convoy steaming for North Africa.

==== Convoys escorted ====
Convoy	Escort Group	Dates	Notes
ON 29		28 Oct-11 Nov 1941	from Iceland to Newfoundland prior to US declaration of war
HX 162		29 Nov-7 Dec 1941	from Newfoundland to Iceland prior to US declaration of war
HX 169		10–18 Jan 1942	from Newfoundland to Iceland
ON 59		29 Jan-2 Feb 1942	from Iceland to Newfoundland
AT 17		1–12 July 1942	troopships from New York City to Firth of Clyde
UGF 1	Task Force 34	24 Oct-8 Nov 1942	from Chesapeake Bay to Morocco

=== Operation Torch ===
On 8 November 1942, Wilkes participated in the assault on Fedhala, French Morocco, and the resulting Naval Battle of Casablanca. Operating with TF 34, she was assigned duty as a control vessel during the first phase and as a fire support vessel during the second. The ship made radar contact on the surface, and a short while later her fire control party reported a dark object in the water. Wilkes dropped a standard nine-charge pattern. Thereafter, sound conditions were unfavorable due to the depth charge turbulence which was extreme in the shallow water 40 fathoms (73 m). After 16 minutes, the search was abandoned. No casualties or hits resulted from enemy action.

The next day, while steaming off Fedhala Point, Wilkes sighted a French destroyer emerging from Casablanca. She left her patrol station and proceeded toward the enemy ship. However, the shore battery on Pointe d'Oukach opened fire, and Wilkes was forced to discontinue her chase as the destroyer retreated back to Casablanca.

On 11 November, Wilkes received news that Casablanca had capitulated; and the destroyer then resumed patrolling the area around the convoy anchorage. At 19:58, a rocket burst near the convoy area; and, one minute later, Winooski reported being torpedoed. At 20:00, Joseph Hewes reported the same fate and sank in less than one hour. Bristol illuminated to open fire on a surfaced submarine and also made a depth charge attack with negative results.

The next day, Wilkes escorted Augusta into Casablanca. She then returned toward the patrol area and resumed patrolling her assigned station. Wilkes picked up a submarine contact at 2,300 yards (2,100 m) and made a shallow depth charge attack, expending four 300-pound and two 600-pound charges without success. Wilkes then abandoned her search and continued her patrol. Little more than an hour later, two ships in the convoy anchorage area were torpedoed. A U-boat hit a third ship after 26 more minutes had passed. The convoy was ordered to weigh anchor and proceed to sea. Wilkes got underway and took station in the convoy's antisubmarine screen off its starboard bow. The convoy changed base course 20 degrees every 15 minutes for almost two hours to avoid detection.

On 15 November 1942, Electra, a cargo ship in another convoy, was torpedoed. Wilkes made a submarine contact at 1,800 yards (1,600 m) and made a depth charge attack with negative results. The destroyer then screened the damaged ship as she was being towed into Casablanca.

Two days later Wilkes rejoined the convoy as it steamed homeward and, on 30 November 1942, arrived at Norfolk. She spent the month of December conducting short escort and patrol missions in waters in New York and Casco Bay, Maine.

=== 1943 ===
Wilkes began the new year 1943 with two voyages from New York to Casablanca and back, taking place between 14 January and 14 February and between 6 March and 5 April. The destroyer then made runs between New York and Norfolk through 14 May 1943.

The next day, she got underway escorting a convoy to the Panama Canal and arrived on 21 May at Cristóbal, Canal Zone. Four days later, Wilkes returned to Hampton Roads. From 29 May through 9 June, the destroyer visited ports along the northeast coast of the United States and then devoted the remainder of 1943 escorting convoys to North Africa, making three round trips from 10 June until Christmas Day when she returned to New York.

=== 1944 ===
On 7 January 1944, Wilkes got underway for the Canal Zone along with Swanson and Marshall transited the canal and arrived at Balboa on 12 January. A week later, Wilkes escorted troop-laden SS Mormacdove, via the Galápagos, Bora Bora, and Nouméa to Milne Bay, New Guinea, where they arrived on 20 February 1944. Five days later, the destroyer got underway for Cape Gloucester, New Britain, made rendezvous with an LST convoy en route, and escorted them to Borgen Bay, Cape Gloucester, Megin Island, Cape Cretin, and the Tami Islands.

On 1 March 1944, Wilkes was anchored in Oro Bay, Buna, New Guinea. Two days later, she embarked American Army troops, complete with equipment, and got underway with eight other destroyers and three high-speed transports and sailed for Los Negros Island of the Admiralty group in order to reinforce elements of the 1st Cavalry Division who were then holding the beachhead.

On 4 March, Wilkes arrived off Hayne Harbor, Los Negros Island, and disembarked all troops and equipment without incident. The destroyer remained there to operate as a fire support ship and received on board casualties evacuated from the combat areas. The next day, Wilkes bombarded Lemondrol Creek, just south of Momote air strip, and targets on the western end of Hayne Harbor. She continued performing such duty through 7 March when Wilkes proceeded to Seeadler Harbor, at Manus Island, Admiralty Group, to assist in the landings there.

After a two-day round trip to Cape Sudest and a brief patrol in Seeadler Harbor, Wilkes returned to Cape Sudest on 24 March for availability. On 9 April, she steamed back to Seeadler Harbor to escort a convoy from Los Negros Island to LanFemak Bay, New Guinea. On the 11th, the destroyer anchored in Oro Bay and underwent availability.

Wilkes arrived at Cape Cretin on 17 April and took on board Lieutenant General Walter Krueger, Commander, Sixth Army, and his staff for transportation to combat areas to observe the landings in the Wakde–Sarmi area of New Guinea. Three days later, Wilkes made rendezvous with TF 77 and took station as a radar picket. On 22 April 1944, the destroyer participated in the landings at Tanahmerah Bay, New Guinea, and, after the troops had gone ashore, continued operations in that area.

D day for the landings at Wakde Island was 17 May 1944. Wilkes contributed fire support and served in the antisubmarine screen. On 26 May, after refueling and repair, the destroyer proceeded toward Biak Island and participated in the landings there.

On 5 June, Wilkes helped to escort a convoy consisting of nine LSTs, three LCIs, four LCTs and escorts through the dangerous waters between the Schouten Islands. The destroyer then continued operations in the Humboldt Bay area and spent the latter part of June bombarding targets ashore on Aitape and Toem, New Guinea. During July, Wilkes participated in the landings at Noemfoor Island on the 1st and at Cape Sansapor on the 30th.

On 19 August, Wilkes departed the New Guinea area and set a course for the Marshall Islands, arriving at Eniwetok on 25 August. Three days later, she joined TF 38 and acted as a screen while the mighty flattops launched air strikes on Iwo Jima, Chichi Jima, Saipan, Yap, Ulithi, Peleliu, and Formosa. On 14 October, Wilkes accompanied the task force to the Philippines and that day made strikes against Luzon. She also screened them during a raid on Leyte on 17 October and during an attack against Samar Island on 24 October.

The next day, the destroyer as part of Task Group 38.4 (TG 38.4) acted as a communication link between two task groups en route to intercept the Japanese Northern Force off Cape Engaño. On 26 October, Wilkes and Swanson were detached and proceeded to Ulithi Atoll for upkeep and repairs.

On 3 November, Wilkes got underway with Nicholson for Apra Harbor, Guam, and arrived there the next day. After a brief round trip to Manus, Admiralty Islands, Wilkes and Nicholson escorted Convoy GE-29 to Eniwetok, arriving on 26 November.

Wilkes set sail for Pearl Harbor on 1 December and arrived seven days later. On 15 December, the destroyer arrived at the Puget Sound Navy Yard. Two days later, she entered Todd's Pacific Shipbuilding Co. yard at Seattle for an overhaul.

=== 1945 ===
On 28 January 1945 after completing her availability and post-repair trials Wilkes made rendezvous with the aircraft carrier Franklin and proceeded to San Francisco. Three days later, she was underway again with Franklin for Pearl Harbor where she arrived on 13 February. She then conducted routine operations and participated in various exercises and drills with Shangri-La.

On 9 March, Wilkes got underway in company with New Mexico and Nicholson for Ulithi, Caroline Islands. After a brief refueling at Eniwetok, the destroyer arrived on 19 March at Ulithi. Three days later, she formed in the van of De Grasse and proceeded to Guam. While en route, Wilkes rescued four survivors of a PBM Mariner which had run out of fuel. On 26 March, she entered Apra Harbor, Guam, and was drydocked for repairs to the underwater sound equipment. On 1 April, Wilkes proceeded singly to Saipan. This was the first of two consecutive trips which lasted until 27 April.

At that time, Wilkes received orders to escort a six-ship convoy to Okinawa and arrived at Hagushi anchorage on 1 May. Three days later, she sighted a red flare fired from a downed PBM. Wilkes took PBM 93 V464 under tow to Kerama Retto and resumed patrol duty. On 6 May, the destroyer was ordered to return to Kerama Retto for limited availability and logistics. Four days later, she got underway and patrolled off the southern entrance to Kerama Retto. Between 12 and 22 May, Wilkes covered carriers for routine flight operations and strikes on Nansei Shoto.

On 22 May 1945, Wilkes escorted the aircraft carrier Makin Island to Kerama Retto for provisions and ammunition replenishment. They departed the following day and, after making mail deliveries, Wilkes returned to her patrol station covering the carrier strikes on Nansei Shoto.

On 24 June, Wilkes and her task unit set course for Leyte and arrived at San Pedro Bay three days later. That day, she sailed for Ulithi, and she arrived there on 30 June for limited availability.

Wilkes sortied from Ulithi on 9 July 1945 and spent more than a month supporting TF 38. On 15 August, Wilkes received an official notice telling her that Japan had capitulated. Five days later, Wilkes was anchored at Ulithi Atoll, Caroline Islands, undergoing voyage repairs and routine upkeep. On 24 August, Wilkes got underway as part of the autosubmarine screen with Task Unit 30.8.9 (TU 30.8.9) patrolling off the Mariana and Bonin Islands.

=== Post war ===
Wilkes proceeded to Okinawa, arriving on 3 September. She then made rendezvous with TG 70.6 on the 7th in the Yellow Sea. On 10 September, the destroyer set her course for the outer transport anchorage at Jinsen (now Inchon), Korea, and arrived the next day. Three days later, she conducted fueling exercises, then spent the remainder of September and October, through 20 October, in the Ito-Jinsen area, delivering passengers and undergoing availability.

On 21 October 1945, Wilkes got underway from Jinsen, bound for the Marianas, and arrived at Saipan on 27 October. That same day, she pushed on toward Hawaii and reached Pearl Harbor on 4 November. Three days later, she headed for the west coast of the United States and arrived at San Diego on the 13th. Wilkes departed the west coast on 16 November transited the Panama Canal, and reached Charleston, South Carolina, on 2 December.

The destroyer reported for duty in the Inactive Fleet, Atlantic, on 3 December. She was moored in the navy yard from 4 to 31 December undergoing preservation. Wilkes was placed out of commission, in reserve, on 4 March 1946. Her name was struck from the Navy List on 16 September 1968, and she was sold to the Southern Scrap Material Co., Ltd., New Orleans, on 29 June 1972.

== Awards ==
Wilkes received ten battle stars for her World War II service.
