= USS Penn =

USS Penn may refer to more than one United States Navy ship:

- USS Pennsylvania R. R. No. 9 (SP-679), also referred to as USS Penn R. R. No. 9, a tug and minesweeper in commission from 1917 to 1919
- USS John Penn (APA-23), an attack transport commissioned in 1942 and sunk in 1943
