= Quick =

Quick, as an adjective, refers to something moving with high speed.

Quick may also refer to:

== In business ==
- Quick (restaurant), a Belgian fast-food restaurant chain
- Quick (sportswear), a Dutch manufacturer of sportswear
- Quick (automobile), an early American automobile

== Music ==
- The Quick (American band), a rock band from Los Angeles
- The Quick (British band), a pop band from England
- Quick (dance group), a hip hop dance group
- Quick (album), a 1994 independently released album by Far

== Films ==
- Quick (1932 film), a German film starring Lilian Harvey
- Quick, a 1993 American crime film starring Teri Polo
- Quick (2011 film), a South Korean film
- Quick (2019 film), also known as The Perfect Patient, a Swedish film

== Publications ==
- Quick (German magazine), published 1948–1992
- Quick (newspaper), a defunct free weekly tabloid in the Dallas-Fort Worth area from 2003 to 2011

== In sports ==
- AHC Quick, also known as Quick Amsterdam, a baseball and softball club based in Amsterdam, the Netherlands
- Quick 1888, also known as Quick Nijmegen, an amateur sporting club from Nijmegen, the Netherlands
- Colloquial term for a fast bowler in cricket

== People and fictional characters ==
- Quick (surname), a list of people and fictional characters
- James Murphy (gridiron football) (born 1959), retired Canadian Football League player nicknamed "Quick"
- James "Quick" Parker (1958–2018), Canadian Football League player
- James Tillis (born 1957), American boxer nicknamed "Quick"

== Places in the United States ==
- Quick, Nebraska, an unincorporated community
- Quick, West Virginia, an unincorporated community

== Other uses ==
- Quick, an informal name for the hyponychium, a sensitive region of skin between the fingertip and the free edge of the fingernail
- USS Quick, a US Navy ship during World War II
- QUICK scheme (Quadratic Upstream Interpolation for Convective Kinematics), in computational fluid dynamics
- Quiz for Improving Crew Knowledge, used in railway crew management in India for evaluation of crew knowledge

== See also ==
- Quickening (disambiguation)
- Quarter-inch cartridge (QIC, pronounced quick), a magnetic tape data storage format
- Quik (disambiguation)
- QUIC, Internet protocol
