= USS Woolsey (DD-437) =

Gleaves-class destroyer

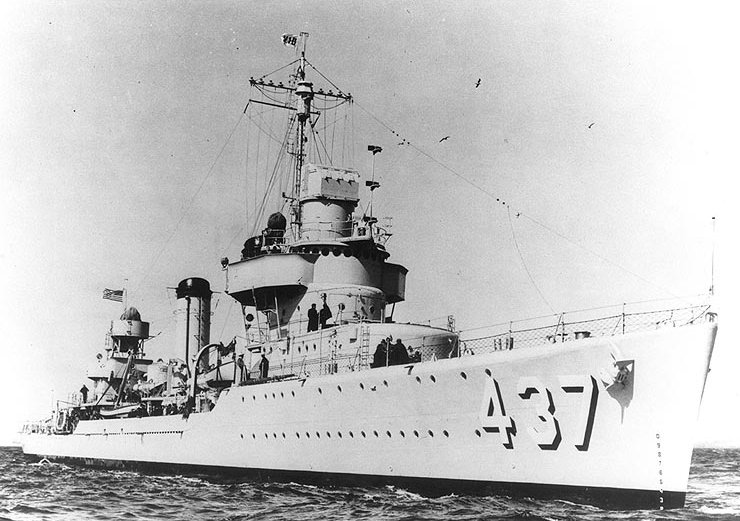
- USS Woolsey (DD-437)

History

United States
- Name: Woolsey
- Builder: Bath Iron Works
- Laid down: 9 October 1939
- Launched: 12 February 1941
- Commissioned: 7 May 1941
- Decommissioned: 6 February 1947
- Stricken: 1 July 1971
- Fate: Sold to Andy International, Inc., for scrapping on 29 May 1974

General characteristics
- Class & type: Gleaves-class destroyer
- Displacement: 1,630 tons
- Length: 348 ft 3 in (106.15 m)
- Beam: 36 ft 1 in (11.00 m)
- Draft: 11 ft 10 in (3.61 m)
- Propulsion: 50,000 shp (37,000 kW); 4 boilers; 2 propellers
- Speed: 37.4 knots (69 km/h)
- Range: 6,500 nmi (12,000 km; 7,500 mi) at 12 kn (22 km/h; 14 mph)
- Complement: 16 officers, 260 enlisted
- Armament: 5 × 5 in (127 mm) DP guns, 6 × 0.5 in (12.7 mm) guns, 6 × 20 mm AA guns, 10 × 21 in (533 mm) torpedo tubes, 2 × depth charge tracks

USS Woolsey (DD-437), a Gleaves-class destroyer, was the second ship to be named Woolsey in the United States Navy. It is the first to be named for both Commodore Melancthon Brooks Woolsey and his father Commodore Melancthon Taylor Woolsey.

Woolsey was laid down on 9 October 1939 at Bath, Maine by the Bath Iron Works and launched on 12 February 1941, sponsored by Mrs. Irving Spencer. The ship was commissioned on 7 May 1941.

== Service history ==
Following a shakedown cruise in the Caribbean Sea, Woolsey joined the Atlantic Fleet at the beginning of the second week in September in 1941. Initially, she served on the Neutrality Patrol, established by President Franklin D. Roosevelt to keep the war in Europe from spreading to the western hemisphere. For a time, she also served as a unit in the screen of the newly commissioned battleship North Carolina. As the year 1941 waned and the United States approached closer and closer to active belligerency, Woolsey began escorting convoys between the United States and Iceland.

The attack on Pearl Harbor and America's entry into World War II found the destroyer in Iceland completing the first leg of one such round-trip voyage. War brought a change to Woolsey's range of duties. Her convoy escort work was broadened to include voyages to the British Isles and Puerto Rico. That duty occupied her energies until the fall of 1942 when she participated in her first invasion operation.

=== Operation Torch ===
For Operation Torch, the invasion of Vichy French-controlled North Africa, Woolsey was assigned to Destroyer Squadron 13 (DesRon 13) which served as antisubmarine screen for the Center Attack Group, the Fedhala landing force. That task organization sortied from Hampton Roads, Virginia, on 24 October and, four days later, rendezvoused with the other units which comprised Task Force 34 (TF 34). After a meandering and mercifully uneventful crossing, the ships reached the vicinity of the Moroccan coast, and each of the three task groups went their separate ways. Woolsey arrived off Fedhala with the Center Attack Force just before midnight on 7 November. Between 05:00 and 06:00 the next morning, the troops landed at Fedhala and consolidated their beachhead quickly. Resistance soon dissipated, and Woolsey seems not to have participated actively in this phase of the operation other than to conduct antisubmarine patrols against a menace which, at that juncture, failed to materialize.

Later, however, U-boats began attacking the transports. On 11 November, U-173 sank Joseph Hewes. Between then and 16 November, several other attacks occurred. On 16 November, U-173 returned to the area. That time though, the U-boat failed to make good her escape. Woolsey, still on antisubmarine patrol, at noon off the harbor mouth caught the submarine's reflection with her sonar and, joined by Swanson and Quick, charged to the attack. The three destroyers made a coordinated depth charge assault that destroyed U-173. The following day, Woolsey departed the Moroccan coast to return to Hampton Roads, where she arrived on 30 November.

=== Escort duty ===
After a series of training operations along the eastern seaboard primarily off the New England coast the destroyer began duty escorting transatlantic convoys in mid-January 1943. On 14 January, she departed New York with Convoy UGF-4. The convoy reached Casablanca on 25 January, and, after a week in port, Woolsey escorted the return convoy, GUF-4, back to New York, arriving there on 13 February. At the beginning of March, she helped shepherd Convoy UGF-6 to Casablanca, then made a brief round-trip voyage from Casablanca to Gibraltar and back before returning to the east coast with GUF-6 early in April. The warship then plied the waters of the eastern seaboard until mid-May, conducting antisubmarine patrols and screening coastwise convoys between Norfolk and New York. On 14 May, Woolsey put to sea from New York with her last transatlantic convoy, UGS-8. She and her charges reached Casablanca on 1 June, and the destroyer remained there a fortnight. On 15 June, she departed Morocco, but, instead of returning to the United States as she had done in the past, she headed via Gibraltar to Algiers on the Mediterranean coast of North Africa.

=== Mediterranean operations ===
When Woolsey reached Gibraltar the next day, an Atlantic phase of her wartime career ended, and the Mediterranean phase began. She reported for duty with the 8th Fleet just in time to participate in the invasion of Sicily, and operations in Italian waters consumed the bulk of her time and energy during the ensuing eight months. For the Sicily assault, she drew duty as a fire-support ship for one of three sectors into which the Licata landing beaches were divided. Save for one brief round-trip voyage to Algiers in mid-July, Woolsey provided gunfire support for the troops operating ashore on Sicily and helped to defend Allied shipping from German air attacks. Though she appears not to have accounted for any Luftwaffe aircraft, she did succeed in destroying an enemy railroad battery with gunfire.

By mid-August, with Sicily secured, she began preparations for the landings on the Italian mainland at Salerno. For that invasion, the destroyer was assigned to the Southern Attack Force fire support group which consisted of five cruisers – four American and one British – and the four destroyers of Woolsey's DesRon 13. In that capacity, she supported the landings on the southern sector of the Gulf of Salerno shoreline. During the assault on 9 September, however, she received only one call for fire support. That event occurred just after 16:30 when her shore fire control party called upon her to join Bristol in shooting up an enemy tank formation.

After completing her mission at Salerno the next day, Woolsey returned to more routine missions. She made voyages between Naples and North African ports escorting supply echelons to the expanding Italian campaign. While operating outside Oran, Algeria, on 16 December, she encountered U-73. After forcing the U-boat to surface with a full pattern of depth charges, Woolsey's gunners went to work and completed the destruction of U-73. The destroyer rescued and made prisoners 23 of the U-boat's survivors.

Late in January 1944, the destroyer returned to amphibious operations, this time as a unit of the Fire Support Group for the Anzio landings. Arriving off the beachhead on 22 January 1944, she delivered call fire support for the troops as they landed. The relative ease experienced during the opening phase at Anzio however, belied the actual complexion of the campaign. Failing to break out of the beachhead early, the Army forces were soon surrounded on three sides by German forces which threatened to push them into the sea until a link-up was made with the Salerno forces in May. During the first month of the battle Woolsey provided gunfire support for the troops ashore. Late in February, however, she departed the Italian campaign to return to the United States for necessary repairs. After a stop at Gibraltar on 11 February, she headed via Horta, Azores to Boston, Massachusetts, where she arrived on 25 February.

Completing her repairs at Boston in mid-March, she conducted refresher training at Casco Bay, Maine, before heading back to the Mediterranean at the end of the third week in April. She stopped at Gibraltar on the last day of that month and arrived at Oran on May Day. The ensuing three months saw her operating out of Oran conducting antisubmarine patrols of the approaches to that port. While operating with a hunting group composed of Benson, Ludlow, and Niblack in mid-May, Woolsey experienced her third and last encounter with a German U-boat. A report of torpedo tracks from a newcomer to the Mediterranean, U-960, brought DesDiv 25 to the area between Oran and Cartagena early on 17 May to commence a two-day search and destroy mission. During the night of 18 and 19 May, the four destroyers split themselves into two search groups and began searching a possible submarine track 10 miles to each side of it. About an hour and 40 minutes into the mid-watch, the four warships received word that a plane had spotted the submarine some 10 miles ahead of Niblack and Ludlow. Those two ships charged to the attack; and, by the time Woolsey arrived on the scene with Benson and Madison, the two destroyers had succeeded in forcing the U-boat to surface after delivering 11 depth charge attacks over the space of four hours. Immediately, all five destroyers opened fire on the submarine while a British Wellington bomber dropped depth bombs from a low altitude near U-960. The German submarine suffered a number of 5-inch (127 mm) hits before submerging again. Niblack responded with more depth charges. That attack evidently rang the death knell for U-960 for she immediately resurfaced, and her crew scrambled off just as she made her final plunge at about 07:15 on 19 May. The destroyers picked up the U-boat's captain and 21 of her crew. Niblack and Ludlow received official credit for sinking the enemy submarine.

Following that action, Woolsey continued relatively routine patrols until the end of July when she began preparations for the invasion of southern France. For that operation, Woolsey was assigned to the Bombardment Group attached to Camel Force. In that capacity, she supported the landings on the right flank of the assault area near Saint-Raphaël. During the 15 August invasion her guns destroyed two German tanks.

Very soon after the initial invasion Woolsey shifted to supporting the 1st Airborne Task Force's drive along the coast toward Italy. She fired upon enemy lines of communication along the coast particularly roads and supported the liberation of Cannes on 24 August. The destroyer continued her operations along the Franco–Italian coast until late October. At that time, she headed for Naples for a visit before returning to Oran, where she arrived on 29 November. The warship was back off the southern coast of France in mid-December and resumed her interdiction duties until mid-January 1945. At that time, she bade farewell to the Mediterranean and the 8th Fleet. Following a brief tour of duty patrolling in the Azores, Woolsey returned to the United States, arriving in New York on 23 February.

=== Convoys escorted ===
Convoy	Escort group	Dates	Notes
HX 161		23 Nov-3 Dec 1941	from Newfoundland to Iceland prior to US declaration of war
ON 43		11-15 Dec 1941	from Iceland to Newfoundland
HX 168		4-10 Jan 1942	from Newfoundland to Iceland
ON 57		24 Jan-7 Feb 1942	from Iceland to Newfoundland
SC 75		24 March 1942	Iceland shuttle
ON 83		5–15 April 1942	from Northern Ireland to Newfoundland
AT 17		1–12 July 1942	troopships from New York City to Firth of Clyde
UGF 1	Task Force 34	24 Oct-8 Nov 1942	from Chesapeake Bay to Morocco
UGF 4		14-27 Jan 1943	from Chesapeake Bay to North Africa
GUF 4		31 Jan-13 Feb 1943	from North Africa to Chesapeake Bay
UGF 6		5–19 March 1943	from Chesapeake Bay to North Africa
GUF 6		24 March-7 April 1943	from North Africa to Chesapeake Bay
UGS 8		28 April-21 May 1943	from Chesapeake Bay to North Africa

=== Pacific operations ===
After operating along the New England coast until late April and escorting a convoy to Great Britain in May, the warship returned home to receive a reinforced antiaircraft battery preparatory to her impending transfer to the war in the Pacific. Late in June, she steamed south to conduct refresher training out of Guantánamo Bay, Cuba. Completing that duty on 7 July, she transited the Panama Canal two days later and reported for duty with the Pacific Fleet. She stopped at San Diego, California, from 18 July to 3 August. A week later, while she was still at Pearl Harbor, Japan capitulated. Late in August, she escorted a convoy carrying occupation troops to Japan. She stopped at Sasebo until 26 September and then began a voyage during which she made a series of port visits at Manila, Shanghai, Okinawa, and Saipan.

From the last-named place, Woolsey got underway on 3 November to return home. After stops at Pearl Harbor and San Diego, the destroyer ended her brief interlude with the Pacific Fleet on 29 November when she retransited the Panama Canal. She arrived in Charleston, South Carolina on 4 December and began preparations for inactivation. On 8 March 1946, the destroyer was placed in commission, in reserve. Eleven months later, on 6 February 1947, she was placed out of commission. Berthed with the Charleston Group, Atlantic Reserve Fleet, for 10 years, Woolsey was towed to Boston in late October 1957. Her name was struck from the Navy list on 1 July 1971, and she was sold to Andy International, Inc., for scrapping on 29 May 1974.

Woolsey earned seven battle stars during World War II.
