= Quik =

Quik may refer to:

- DJ Quik (born 1970), American MC and record producer
- Nesquik (formerly known as Nestlé Quik in some countries), a family of milk beverage products made by the Nestlé corporation
- Pegasus Quik, a British flying wing ultralight trike
- quik (boot loader), a boot loader designed to start Linux on Apple Macintosh PowerPC systems
- Quik Internet (NZ) Ltd, a former New Zealand based ISP
- Charlotte Quik (born 1982), German politician
- Serge Quik, Belgian drag queen

== See also ==
- QUIC, network protocol
- Quick (disambiguation)
