= Electra (star) =

Blue-white giant star in the constellation of Taurus

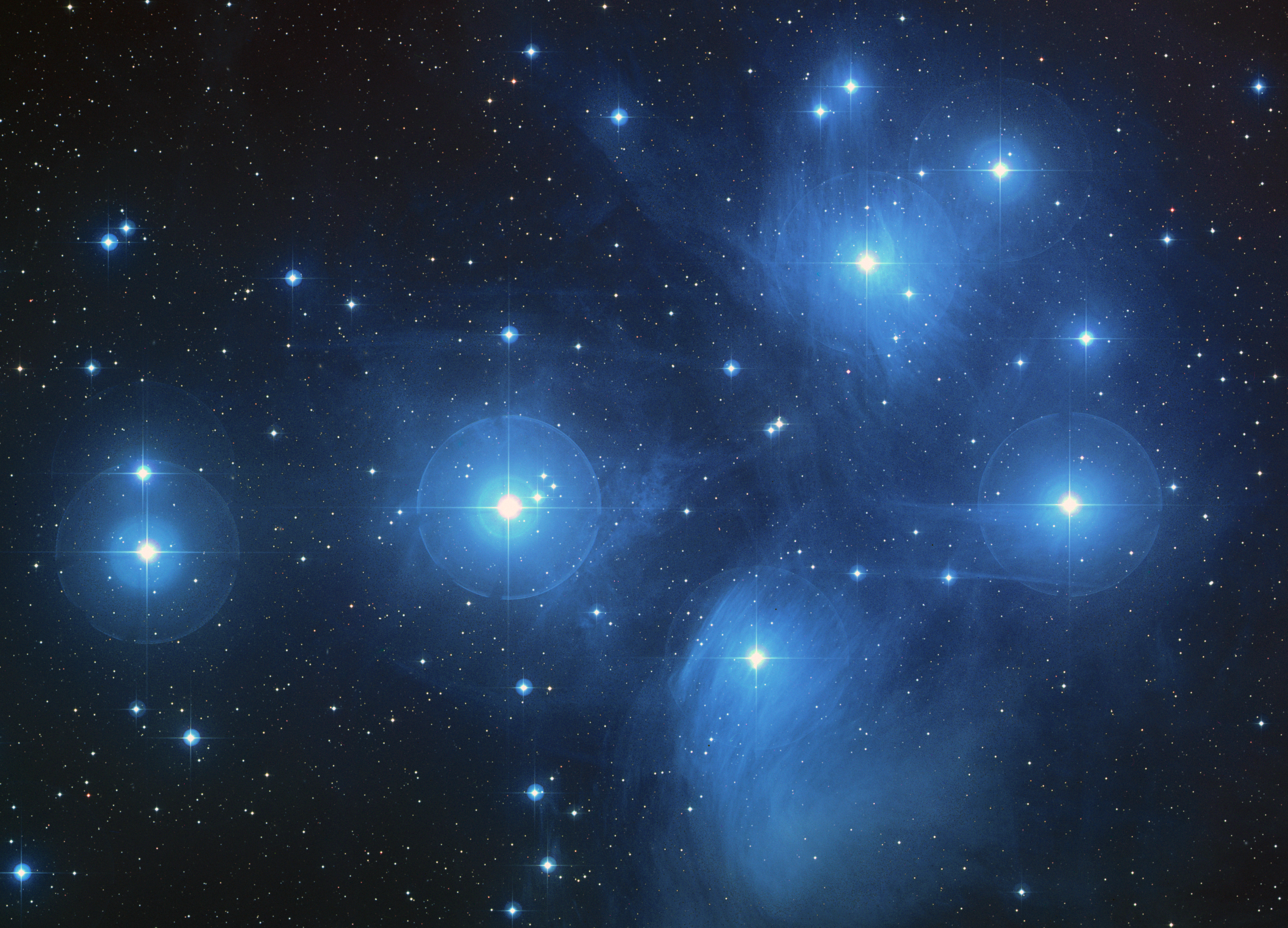
- Electra in the Pleiades cluster (circled)

Observation data Epoch J2000 Equinox ICRS
- Constellation: Taurus
- Right ascension: 03^{h} 44^{m} 52.53688^{s}
- Declination: +24° 06′ 48.0112″
- Apparent magnitude (V): 3.70

Characteristics
- Spectral type: B6 IIIe
- U−B color index: −0.40
- B−V color index: −0.12

Astrometry
| Radial velocity (R_{v}) | +10.9 km/s |
| Proper motion (μ) | RA: +20.84 mas/yr Dec.: −46.06 mas/yr |
| Parallax (π) | 8.06±0.25 mas |
| Distance | 444 ly (136 pc) |
| Absolute magnitude (M_{V}) | −1.77 |

Details
| Mass | 4.6-4.7 M_{☉} |
| Radius | 6.06+0.14 −0.15 R_{☉} |
| Luminosity | 940 L_{☉} |
| Surface gravity (log g) | 3.412±0.047 cgs |
| Temperature | 13,484±293 K |
| Rotational velocity (v sin i) | 181 km/s |
| Age | 115 Myr |

Other designations
- 17 Tauri, BD+23 507, FK5 136, GC 4477, HD 23302, HIP 17499, HR 1142, SAO 76131, NSV 15755

Database references
| SIMBAD | data |

Electra (/əˈlɛktrə/ ə-LEK-trə), designated 17 Tauri, is a blue-white giant star in the constellation of Taurus located approximately 440 light years away. It is the third-brightest star in the Pleiades open star cluster (M45), visible to the naked eye with an apparent magnitude of 3.7. Like the other bright stars of the Pleiades, it is named for one of the Seven Sisters of Greek mythology.

== Properties ==
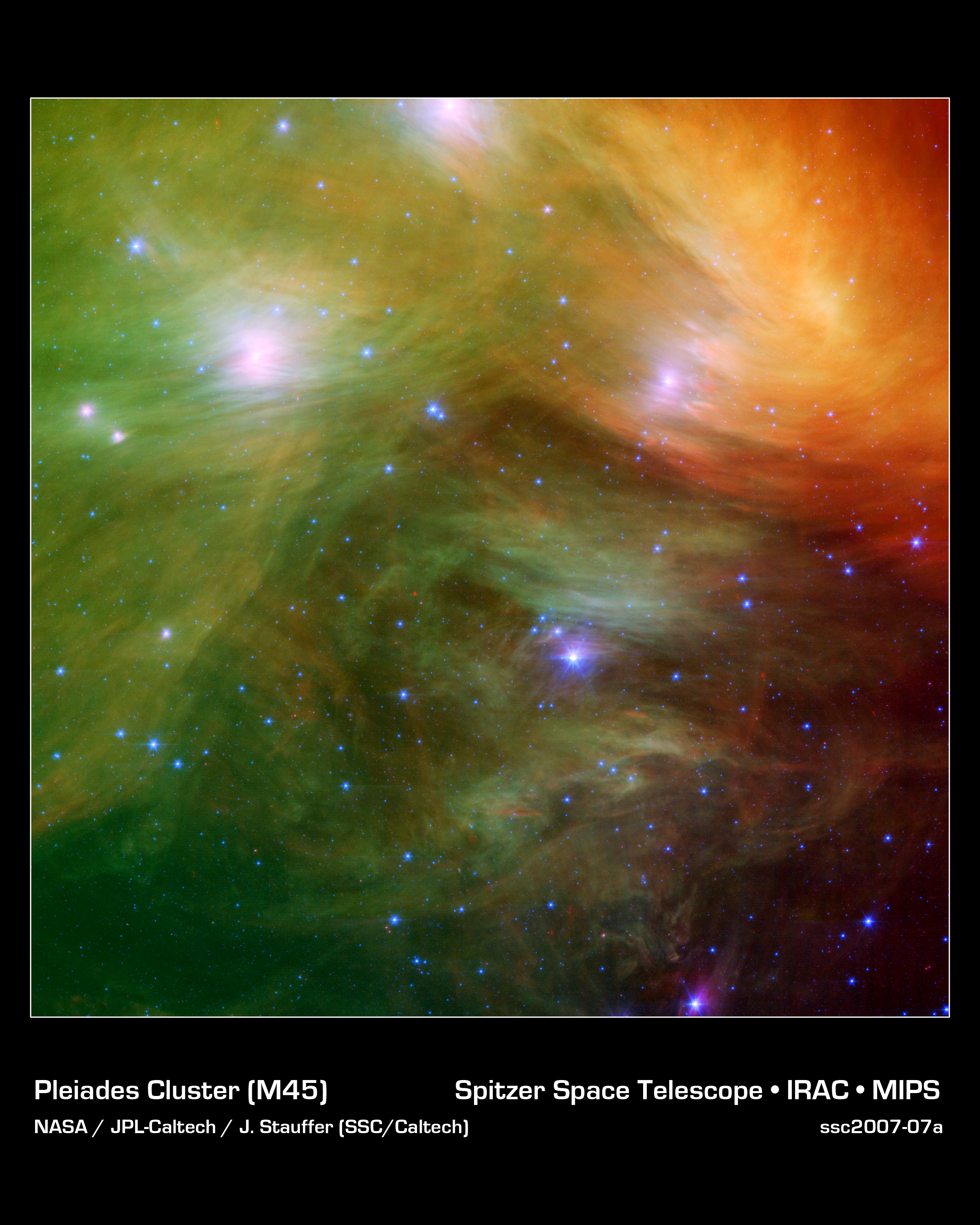
The Pleiades Cluster in infrared with Electra at the very top of the frame

Electra has an apparent brightness of 3.72, the third-brightest of the stars in the group. It belongs to the spectral class B6 IIIe and is approximately 440 light-years from the Sun. A number of papers have reported Electra to be a multiple star, but these have been contradictory and never confirmed.

The projected rotational velocity of this star is 181 km/s, making it a fast rotator. This is the velocity component of the star's equatorial rotation along the line of sight to the Earth. The estimated inclination of the star's pole is 46.8°±1.6°, giving it a true equatorial rotational velocity of 320±18 km/s. The rapid rotation rate of this star flattens the poles and stretch the equator. This makes the surface gravity of the star non-uniform and causes temperature variation. This effect is known as gravity darkening, because it results in a variation of radiation by latitude. The rapid rotation extends the life span of the star by increasing the core density and reducing the radiation output.

This is classified as a Be star, which is a B-type star with prominent emission lines of hydrogen in its spectrum. The Be stars have a rotation rate that is 1.5–2 times the rotation of normal B-type stars. This high rate of rotation may allow mass loss during even minor prominences. Changes in the radial velocity measurements indicate that this star may have a companion, which would make Electra a spectroscopic binary. However, follow-up studies including interferometry have failed to confirm any companion star(s), so it is likely a single star.

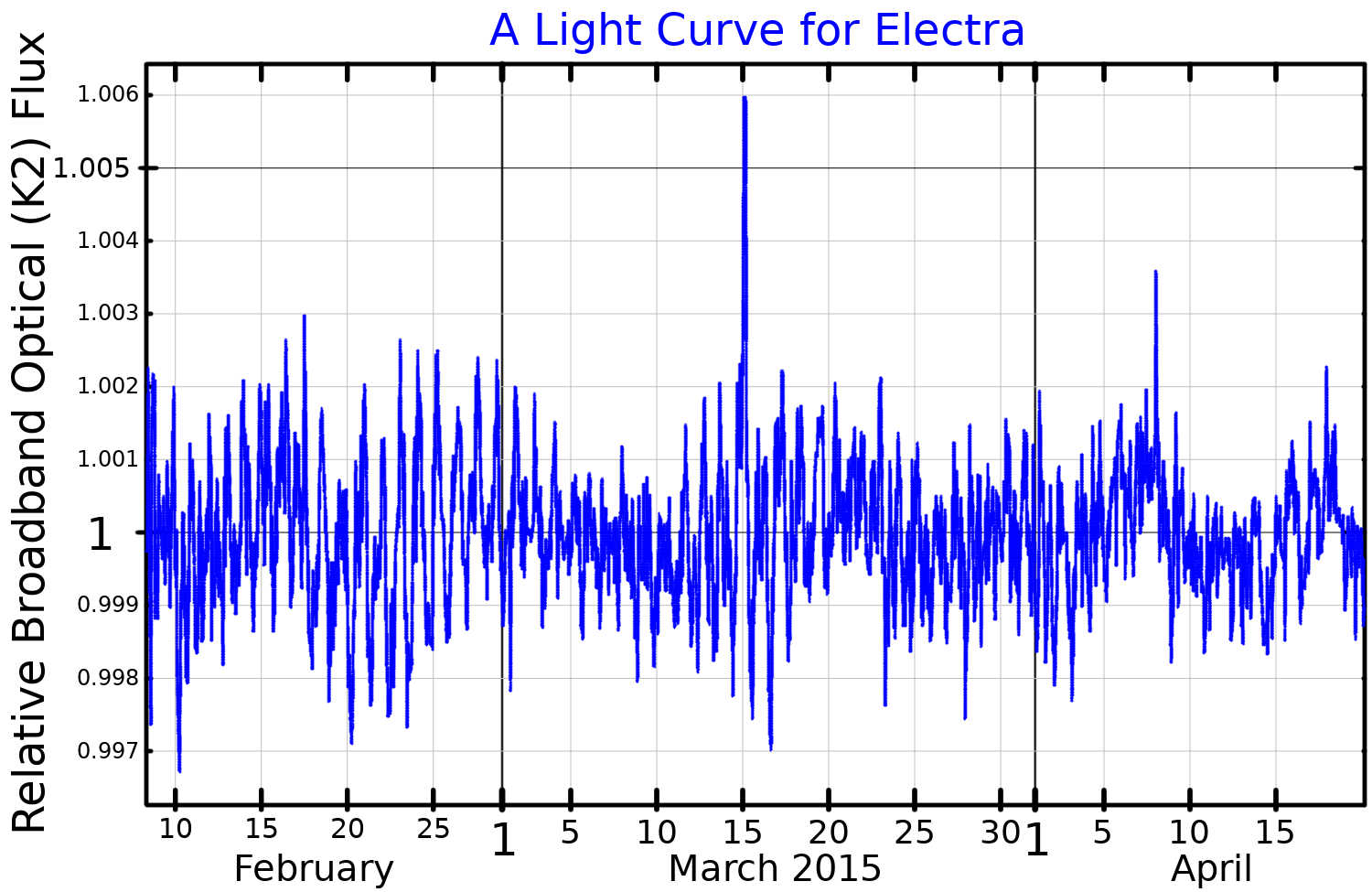
A light curve for Electra, adapted from White et al. (2017)

Electra may be a variable star, and it appears in the New Catalogue of Suspected Variable Stars as NSV 15755. Low amplitude variability of the brightness of Electra was detected by Kepler/K2, and Fourier analysis of the star's light curve shows several periods of oscillation, the strongest being 1.107 and 1.165 days. The International Variable Star Index classifies it as a slowly pulsating B star.

Infrared observations of this star showed an excess level of radiation equal to about 0.5 magnitudes. This emission is probably from a gaseous disk created by radiation-driven mass loss and rapid rotation of the star. These disks are created by an ejection of material roughly every ten years, which then settles into the equatorial plane about the star. However, the bright nebulosity that surrounds this star makes the observation uncertain.

== Nomenclature ==
17 Tauri is the star's Flamsteed designation.

It bore the traditional name Electra. Electra was one of the Pleiades sisters in Greek mythology. In 2016, the International Astronomical Union organized a Working Group on Star Names (WGSN) to catalogue and standardize proper names for stars. The WGSN approved the name Electra for this star on 21 August 2016 and it is now so entered in the IAU Catalog of Star Names.

=== Military namesakes ===
USS Electra (1843) and USS Electra (AK-21/AKA-4), were both ships of the United States Navy.
