= USS Swanson =

Gleaves-class destroyer

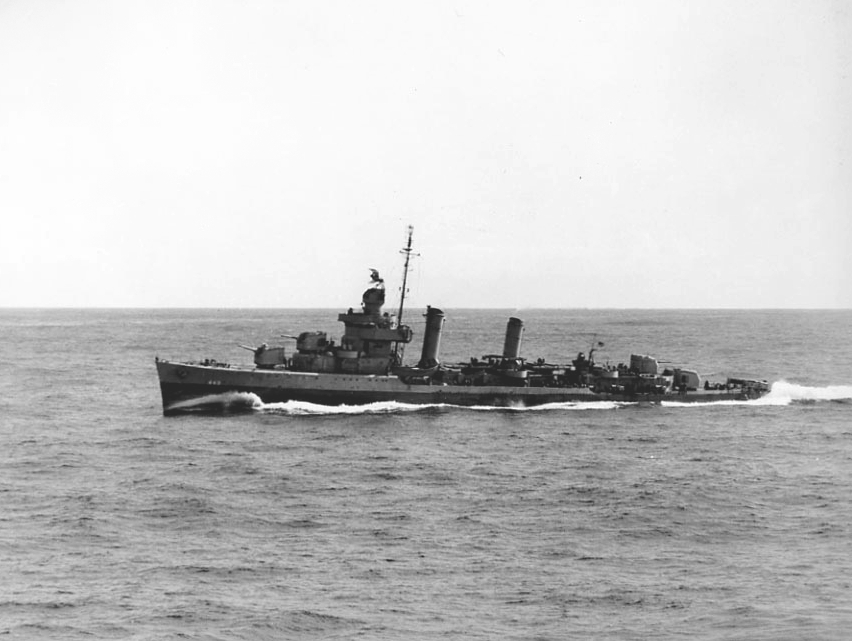
- USS Swanson (DD-443) underway in November 1942.

History

United States
- Name: Swanson
- Namesake: Claude A. Swanson
- Builder: Charleston Navy Yard
- Laid down: 15 November 1939
- Launched: 2 November 1940
- Commissioned: 29 May 1941
- Decommissioned: 10 December 1945
- Stricken: 1 March 1971
- Fate: Sold for scrap, 29 June 1972

General characteristics
- Class & type: Gleaves-class destroyer
- Displacement: 1,630 tons
- Length: 348 ft 4 in (106.17 m)
- Beam: 36 ft 1 in (11.00 m)
- Draft: 17 ft 6 in (5.33 m)
- Propulsion: 50,000 shp (37,000 kW); 4 boilers; 2 propellers
- Speed: 35 knots (65 km/h)
- Range: 6,500 nmi (12,000 km; 7,500 mi) at 12 kn (22 km/h; 14 mph)
- Complement: 216
- Armament: 4 × 5 in (127 mm) DP guns, 6 × 0.5 in (12.7 mm) guns, 6 × 20 mm AA guns, 10 × 21 in (533 mm) torpedo tubes, 2 × depth charge tracks

USS Swanson (DD-443) was a Gleaves-class destroyer of the United States Navy, named for Secretary of the Navy Claude A. Swanson (1862–1939).

She participated in, Operation Torch, Operation Husky, the Pacific theatre, escorted nine convoys and earned eight battle stars for her service.

== Service history ==
Swanson was laid down on 15 November 1939 by the Charleston Navy Yard, launched on 2 November 1940; sponsored by Mrs Claude A. Swanson, widow of Secretary Swanson; and commissioned on 29 May 1941.

After her initial shakedown cruise, Swanson began convoy escort duties between New England, Bermuda, and Iceland. She escorted the battleships Washington and North Carolina, and aircraft carrier Hornet, on their trial runs in late 1941. After the Attack on Pearl Harbor on 7 December 1941, her convoy duties were extended to include three runs to Scotland and single trips to Nova Scotia and Greenland.

=== Operation Torch ===
In October 1942, after amphibious training in Chesapeake Bay, Swanson joined the invasion fleet sailing for French North Africa. In the early morning of 8 November 1942, she lay close inshore to guide the landing craft to the beach at Fedhala. As she began to move further offshore at daybreak, the French shore batteries opened fire and, for the next two hours, Swanson returned fire to protect the transports.

Shortly after 08:00, seven French destroyers sortied from Casablanca to attack the transports and opened fire on the nearest ships, destroyers Ludlow, Wilkes and Swanson. Ludlow was hit and withdrew. Swanson and Wilkes were join by cruisers Augusta and Brooklyn, which were steaming up to engage the French.

The covering force, led by battleship Massachusetts, took over the action from the Augusta group; but, at 10:00, Swanson was once again in action, engaging three French destroyers and the shore batteries before being ordered seaward to protect the convoy.

German U-boats had not been present during the landings but, on 11 November 1942, U-130 and U-173 arrived and sank four transports, damaged a destroyer and a tanker. On 16 November, the destroyer Woolsey gained sonar contact; and, after making several attacks which brought up oil and air bubbles, turned the contact over to Swanson and Quick, which made further attacks. The contact was evaluated at that time as a wreck but subsequent information revealed that it was U-173, destroyed at (33°40′N 7°35′W) with all hands.

=== Operation Husky ===
After the Casablanca landings, Swanson returned to Atlantic convoy duty until July 1943, when she joined the Sicily invasion force. She and Roe were assigned as fire support ships for the landings at Licata, Sicily. On 10 July, the night before the landings, she collided with Roe while investigating radar contacts and went dead in the water with a flooded fire room. She was able to control further flooding and retired to Malta for temporary repairs before proceeding to the Brooklyn Navy Yard in July.

=== Convoys escorted ===
Convoy	Escort Group	Dates	Notes
HX 158		5-13 Nov 1941	from Newfoundland to Iceland prior to US declaration of war
ON 37		22-30 Nov 1941	from Iceland to Newfoundland prior to US declaration of war
HX 165		17-24 Dec 1941	from Newfoundland to Iceland
ON 51		2-11 Jan 1942	from Iceland to Newfoundland
HX 172		28 Jan-4 Feb 1942	from Newfoundland to Iceland
ON 65		12-19 Feb 1942	from Iceland to Newfoundland
AT 17		1–12 July 1942	troopships from New York City to Firth of Clyde
ON 115		24 July-8 Aug 1942	from Northern Ireland to Boston
UGF 1	Task Force 34	24 Oct-8 Nov 1942	from Chesapeake Bay to Morocco

=== Pacific Theater ===
With repairs complete, Swanson resumed escort duties in the Atlantic until sailing on 7 January 1944 to join the 7th Fleet off New Guinea. She provided gunfire support for landings in Seeadler Harbor between 3 and 7 March. She then acted as command ship for the Hollandia landings on 22 April, with both US Army and Navy commanders on board. After providing gunfire support during the Noemfoor assault on 2 July, she acted as command ship for the Sansapor landings on 30 July.

On 19 August 1944, the destroyer left New Guinea and joined Fast Carrier Task Force (TF 38). She screened the carriers Franklin, Enterprise, and San Jacinto, while they launched airstrikes on Bonins, Ulithi, Yap, Palau, Okinawa, Taiwan, and while they provided air support for the Philippine landings on 20 October. As the Japanese launched a three-pronged naval attack on the United States forces at Leyte, Swanson's task group first assisted in turning back the Japanese central force in San Bernardino Strait during the day of 24 and then moved north to intercept a Japanese decoy force of carriers off Cape Engaño, Luzon.

=== Air-sea rescue duty ===
On 26 October, Swanson was detached from the carrier force and assigned to the escort patrol group based at Saipan. For the rest of 1944 and early 1945, she was engaged in air-sea rescue, antisubmarine, and radar picket patrols between Iwo Jima and Saipan and served as the headquarters for the commander of the group. She was detached in April 1945 for overhaul at the Puget Sound Navy Yard. After refresher training at San Diego, California, Swanson resumed her patrol and escort duties around Iwo Jima.

=== Decommissioning ===
On 9 September 1945, USS Swanson began the trip back to the United States for inactivation. The destroyer was decommissioned on 10 December 1945 and placed in reserve at Charleston, South Carolina. She was stricken from the Navy list on 1 March 1971 and scrapped in 1972.

== Awards ==
Swanson received eight battle stars for her service.

- Algeria-Morocco landings 8-11 Nov. 1942
- Sicilian occupation 9-15 Jul. 1943
- Sinking German submarine U-173
- Cape Gloucester, New Guinea, New Britain Island 21 Feb-1 Mar 1944; Admiralty Islands 11, 14-22 Mar 1944
- Hollandia operation 21-26 Apr, 1–9 May 1944
- Biak Island operation 27 May- 7 June 12–17 Jun 1944. Noemfoor Island operation 2–7, 12-19 Jul 1944. Cape Sanapor operation 30 July-2 Aug. 1944
- Raids on Volcano-Bonin Island and Yap 31 Aug-Sept 1944. Capture and occupation of Southern Palau Islands 6 Sept. 14 Oct. 1944. Assaults on the Philippine Islands 9-24 Sep.
- Battle of Surigao Strait 24-26 Oct. 1944 3rd Fleet Supporting operations, Okinawa attack 10 Oct. 1944. North Luzon and Formosa attacks 11-14 Oct 1944. Luzon attacks 15, 17-19 Oct 1944.

USS Swanson was awarded the Navy Occupation Service Medal for the period of 8 Sept to 23 Oct 1945
