= USS Edward Rutledge =

American transport vessel

Coordinates: 33.798°N 7.410°W

History

United States
- Ordered: as SS Exeter
- Laid down: 1931
- Launched: 4 April 1931
- Acquired: 7 January 1942
- Commissioned: USS Edward Rutledge (AP-52), 18 April 1942
- Stricken: 7 December 1942
- Fate: Sunk, 12 November 1942

General characteristics
- Displacement: 14,330 t
- Length: 475 ft (145 m)
- Beam: 62 ft (19 m)
- Draught: 26 ft (7.9 m)
- Propulsion: steam turbine
- Speed: 16 knots (30 km/h)
- Complement: unknown
- Armament: one single 5 in (127 mm)/38 dual-purpose gun mount; four single 3 in (76 mm) dual-purpose gun mounts; eight single 20 mm guns AA gun mounts

USS Edward Rutledge (AP-52/APA-24) was an Edward Rutledge-class troop transport (AP), later re-designated as an attack transport (APA). She was acquired by the U.S. Navy for use in World War II, and was assigned the task of transporting troops to and from battle areas. Operating in dangerous Mediterranean waters on 12 November 1942, she was sunk after being struck by a German submarine’s torpedo at Fedala Bay, Morocco.

== Construction history ==
Edward Rutledge (AP-52) was built in 1931 by New York Shipbuilding Corp., Camden, New Jersey, for the American Export Lines as the SS Exeter; one of American Export Lines "4 Aces" - sister ships, SS Excalibur, SS Exeter, SS Excambion and SS Exochorda — she provided regular service between New York and Europe; transferred to the Navy from the Maritime Commission 7 January 1942; converted by Tampa Shipbuilding Co., Tampa, Florida; and commissioned 18 April 1942.

== North Africa operations ==
Edward Rutledge sailed from Tampa, Florida, in convoy 13 May 1942 to Norfolk, Virginia. She operated in Chesapeake Bay training soldiers for the invasion of North Africa. Departing Hampton Roads 24 October, she landed troops at Fedhala, French Morocco, on 8 November, and lay off the beach unloading her cargo with two lifeboats, the only boats remaining after the Naval Battle of Casablanca.

=== Sinking ===
On 12 November she was torpedoed by U-130 commanded by Ernst Kals, who slipped past the escort screen to sink three transports. Edward Rutledge's crew attempted to beach her but all power had been lost; she settled rapidly by the stern and sank with the loss of 15 men.

== Military honors and awards ==
Edward Rutledge received one battle star for World War II service:

North African occupation (Algeria-Morocco landings, 8 November to 11 November 1942).
