= USS John Penn =

Attack transport

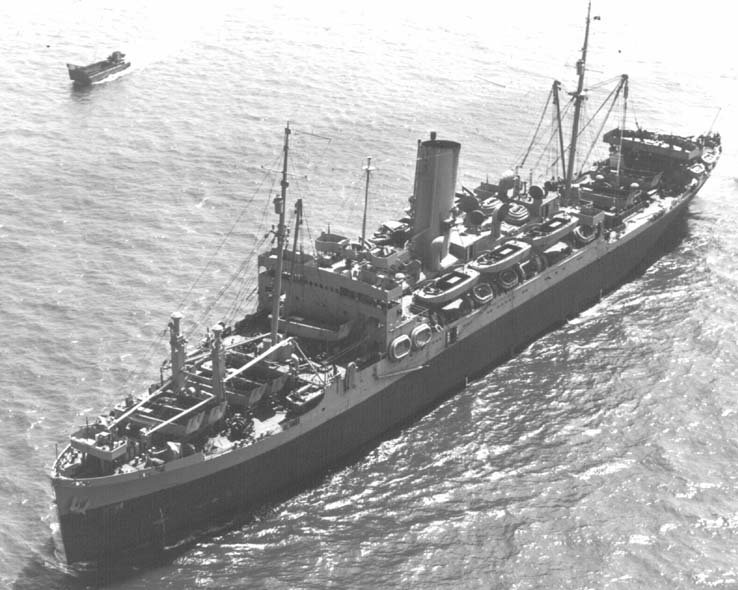
- USS John Penn under way, 13 September 1942

History

United States
- Name: Excambion (1931–1942); John Penn (1942–1943)
- Namesake: John Penn, signatory to the American Declaration of Independence
- Builder: New York Shipbuilding
- Laid down: 25 October 1930
- Launched: 28 May 1931
- Acquired: 8 January 1942
- Commissioned: 6 April 1942
- Reclassified: AP-51 to APA-23, 1 February 1943
- Honours and awards: One battle star for World War II service
- Fate: Sunk by enemy action, 13 August 1943

General characteristics
- Class & type: none
- Displacement: 9,360 tons (lt)
- Length: 475 ft 4 in (144.88 m)
- Beam: 62 ft (19 m)
- Draft: 26 ft (7.9 m)
- Propulsion: Steam turbine
- Armament: 1 × 5"/38 caliber dual-purpose gun; 4 × 3"/50 cal. dp guns; 8 × 20mm guns

USS John Penn (APA-23) was an attack transport that served with the US Navy during World War II. Named after Founding Father John Penn, a signatory to the American Declaration of Independence, she was the only ship in her class.

The ship was initially launched as Excambion in 1931 by the New York Shipbuilding Company of Camden, New Jersey as one of American Export Lines's original "Four Aces", SS Excalibur, SS Exeter, SS Excambion and SS Exochorda. She was acquired by the Navy 8 January 1942; and commissioned 6 April 1942.

== World War II ==
=== Invasion of North Africa ===
After fitting out and training, John Penn began preparations for what was to be one of the largest overseas expeditions ever undertaken, Operation Torch, the North African Invasion. From 4 to 16 October 1942, John Penn loaded Army equipment, cargo, and troops, then topped off with fuel. She sortied from Hampton Roads 23 October with Admiral Hewitt's Western Naval Task Force.

As a unit of Rear Admiral Monroe Kelly's Northern Attack Group she arrived 8 November in the transport area off Mehdia, Western Morocco, where she began landing troops and putting cargo ashore. Although hampered by heavy surf and fire from enemy shore batteries, she unloaded with efficiency and dispatch. At 1053 an enemy aircraft attacked John Penn, but her after batteries quickly splashed the intruder. On 15 November she departed for Casablanca, arrived that same day, and unloaded the remainder of her cargo. She sailed for Norfolk, Virginia 17 November arriving 30 November.

Two of her fellow Aces, USS Joseph Hewes (AP-50) (formerly Excalibur) and USS Edward Rutledge (AP-52) (formerly Exeter) were sunk by U-boats during Operation Torch.

=== Guadalcanal campaign ===
John Penn departed Norfolk 17 December for deployment to the Pacific, arriving New Caledonia via the Canal Zone 18 January 1943. She departed New Caledonia 24 January; and touching at Espiritu Santo three days later, got under way to pick up survivors from USS Chicago (CA-29), sunk off Guadalcanal 29 January. In all, she received 1,003 men and 63 officers, including Captain R. C. Davis, the lost cruiser's commanding officer. After debarking her grateful passengers at Noumea, New Caledonia, she spent the next six months delivering supplies, equipment, and troops to Guadalcanal from the New Hebrides, the Fiji Islands and New Zealand. Reclassified APA-23 on 1 February 1943, she continued to bring supplies and troops into this bitterly contested island.

==== Torpedoed and sunk ====
On 13 August John Penn had just finished unloading a cargo of 155-mm ammunition off Lunga Point, Guadalcanal. At 2120 she came under attack by enemy torpedo planes. Three minutes later, when the transport took one of the planes under fire, the plane burst into flames and crashed into her mainmast. About that same instant a torpedo from another plane hit the ship's starboard quarter. Despite vigorous efforts to save her, John Penn went down stern first at 2150. Some 35 survivors were rescued by a United States Navy coastal transport vessel, the USS APc-25, whose commanding officer was Navy Lieutenant John D. Cartano. At the time of the torpedoing, Captain Harry William Need (later Rear Admiral) commanded USS John Penn.

In her naval service, the transport had played a key role in the assault and occupation of French Morocco and contributed greatly to the struggle for Guadalcanal. John Penn's crew, reassigned to other ships, took part in later decisive naval victories.

=== Awards ===
John Penn received one battle star for World War II service.

=== Diving the Wreck ===
John Penn is a popular dive site in Honiara. The wreck lies on its starboard side with the port hull in about 36 metres of water. The sand under the starboard side is about 56 metres. Strong currents often make the diving difficult.
