= USS Foote (DD-511) =

Fletcher-class destroyer

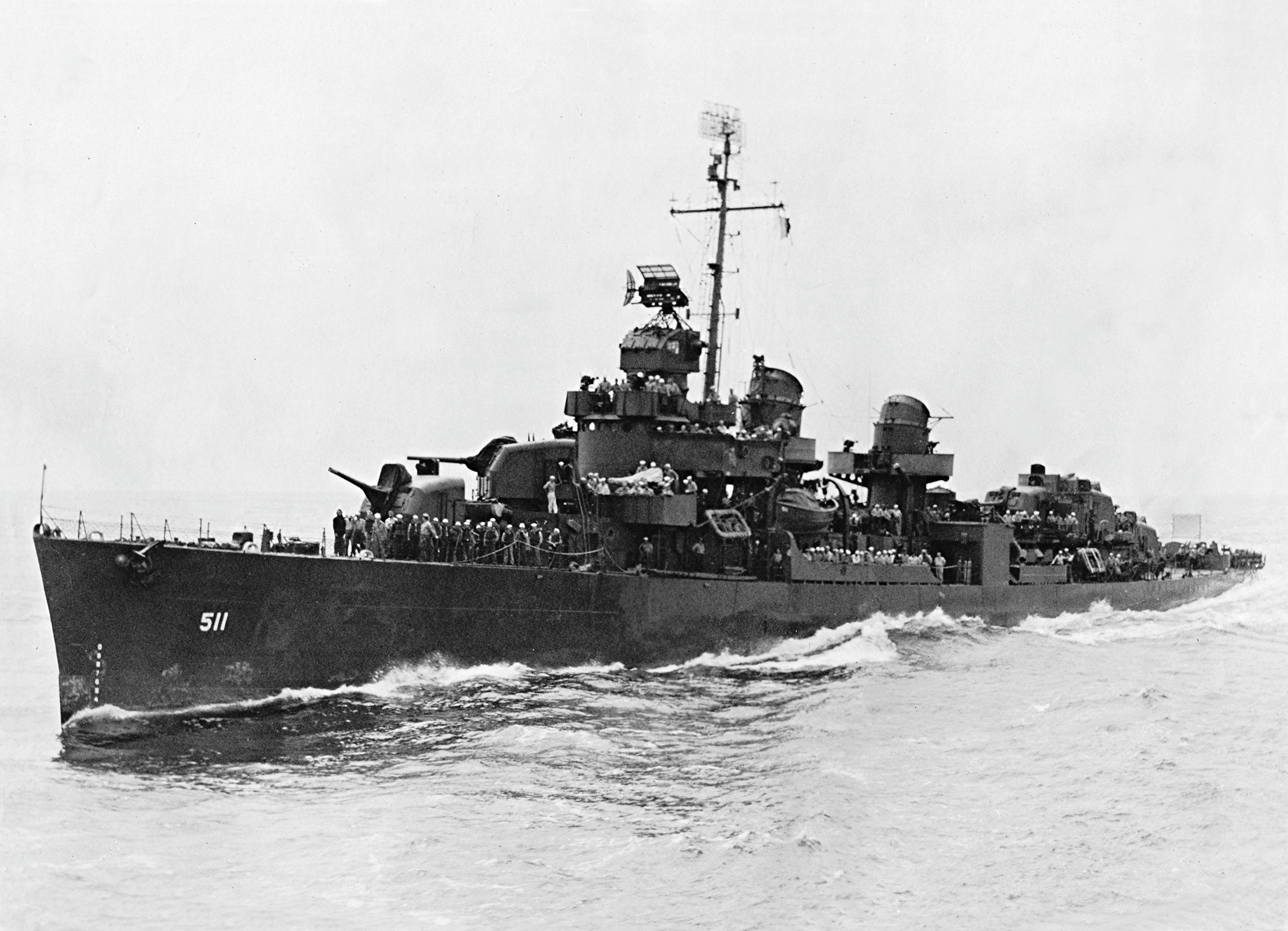
- USS Foote

History

United States
- Namesake: Andrew Hull Foote
- Builder: Bath Iron Works
- Laid down: 14 April 1942
- Launched: 11 October 1942
- Commissioned: 22 December 1942
- Decommissioned: 18 April 1946
- Stricken: 1 October 1972
- Fate: Sold for scrap, 2 January 1974

General characteristics
- Class & type: Fletcher-class destroyer
- Displacement: 2,050 tons
- Length: 376 ft 6 in (114.7 m)
- Beam: 39 ft 8 in (12.1 m)
- Draft: 17 ft 9 in (5.4 m)
- Propulsion: 60,000 shp (45 MW); 2 propellers
- Speed: 35 knots (65 km/h; 40 mph)
- Range: 6500 nmi. (12,000 km) at 15 kt
- Complement: 336
- Armament: 5 × single Mk 12 5 in (127 mm)/38 guns; 5 × twin 40 mm (1.6 in) Bofors AA guns; 7 × single 20 mm (0.8 in) Oerlikon AA guns; 2 × quintuple 21 in (533 mm) torpedo tubes; 6 × single depth charge throwers; 2 × depth charge racks

USS Foote (DD-511), a Fletcher-class destroyer, was the third ship of the United States Navy to be named for Rear Admiral Andrew Hull Foote (1806–1863), who served during the Civil War.

Foote was launched on 11 October 1942 by Bath Iron Works, Bath, Maine; sponsored by Mrs. J. C. Aspinwall, granddaughter of Admiral Foote; and commissioned 22 December 1942, Commander Bernard L. Austin in command.

== Service history ==
=== 1943 ===
In April Foote received a new skipper, CDR Alston Ramsay. After escorting a convoy to Casablanca between 1 April and 9 May, Foote prepared for Pacific duty, and on 28 June arrived at Nouméa, New Caledonia, to join Destroyer Squadron 23. Through the next 3 months, she escorted convoys from Nouméa to Guadalcanal, Efate, Espiritu Santo, Vella Lavella, and Rendova. From 27 to 29 September, she hunted Japanese barges evacuating troops from Kolombangara, and on the last night, attacked such a group, probably sinking two. While McCalla was working to correct steering trouble that night, Foote drove off a lone Japanese aircraft, then stood by McCalla and Patterson after the two collided, until a tug arrived on the scene.

Putting into Vella Lavella on 1 October with an LST convoy which she had joined at sea, Foote joined in fighting off an enemy air attack later that day, splashing at least one plane. She escorted the LSTs back to Guadalcanal, returning to convoy duty until covering the landings on the Treasury Islands on 26–27 October. She put out from Purvis Bay on 31 October to bombard Buka Island and the Shortlands, neutralizing enemy airfields to prevent air opposition to the Bougainville landings. Alerted to the movement of an enemy task force, Foote made contact by radar in the early morning of 2 November, and in the Battle of Empress Augusta Bay which followed, she was hit by an enemy torpedo which blew off her stern, as the other ships of her division launched the torpedo attacks which helped sink two Japanese ships and turned back the planned assault by the Japanese task force on the shipping off Bougainville. With 19 killed and 17 wounded, Foote's men kept their ship afloat despite the fact that both engines were stopped, steering control lost and the main deck awash aft. They also manned their guns to splash at least one wave of Japanese planes which attacked the American ships the next morning. She was towed into Purvis Bay on 4 November for repairs.

=== 1944-1946 ===
Returning to San Pedro, California on 4 March, towed by Gulf Star, Foote was repaired and modernized. Between 6 August and 24 October, she served as a training ship for precommissioning crews of new destroyers, sailing out of San Francisco. Bound for action once more, she crossed the Pacific to Kossol Roads, where she arrived 13 November to join the screen of an aircraft carrier force providing air cover for convoys from Manus Island reinforcing troops at Leyte. Foote replenished at Manus from 27 November to 9 December, then sailed for Leyte, arriving 13 December.

Foote put to sea on 19 December to guard a convoy to Mindoro, which was attacked several times by kamikazes. The destroyer splashed at least one of these, as well as rescuing survivors from two LSTs which were hit. Returning to Leyte on 24 December, she prepared for the Lingayen invasion, for which she sailed screening amphibious forces on 4 January 1945. Before the landings of 9 January, she fired in several enemy air attacks, and bombarded the beaches. After a fast voyage to Leyte to escort a resupply convoy, Foote took up screening and patrol duty in Lingayen Gulf until returning to Leyte 31 March.

The destroyer had escort and training duty between Leyte, Manus, and Morotai through 13 May 1945, when she got underway from Leyte for picket duty off Okinawa. During the numerous enemy air attacks while she was on station, she was credited with knocking down at least one plane, and suffered two men wounded from the effect of a near miss on 24 May. She took part in the landings of 3–6 June at Iheya Shima, and those of 9 June at Aguni Shima, and patrolled off Okinawa until sailing 10 September for the east coast of the United States. Arriving at New York 17 October 1945, Foote was decommissioned on 18 April 1946.

Foote was stricken from the Naval Vessel Register 1 October 1972; she was sold 2 January 1974 and broken up for scrap.

== Honors ==
Foote received four battle stars for World War II service.
