= The Quickening =

The Quickening may refer to:

== Music ==
=== Albums ===
- The Quickening (The Vandals album)
- The Quickening (Kathryn Williams album)
- The Quickening (Jim White and Marisa Anderson album)
- The Quickening, an album by Adelaide hip-hop group Funkoars
- The Quickening, an album by American record producer David Leonard

=== Songs ===
- "The Quickening", a song by Latyrx on their album The Album
- "The Quickening", a song by Bad Religion on their album The Empire Strikes First
- "The Quickening", a song by Cinematrik for the game Hacknet

== Film and television ==
- "The Quickening" (Star Trek: Deep Space Nine), an episode of the science fiction TV series Star Trek: Deep Space Nine
- Highlander II: The Quickening, the second installment to the Highlander film series

== Literature ==
- The Quickening: Today's Trends, Tomorrow's World, a book written by Art Bell
- The Quickening (series), a fantasy novel series by Fiona McIntosh
- "The Quickening" (short story), a short story by Michael Bishop

== See also ==
- Quickening (disambiguation)
