= German submarine U-173 =

German World War II submarine

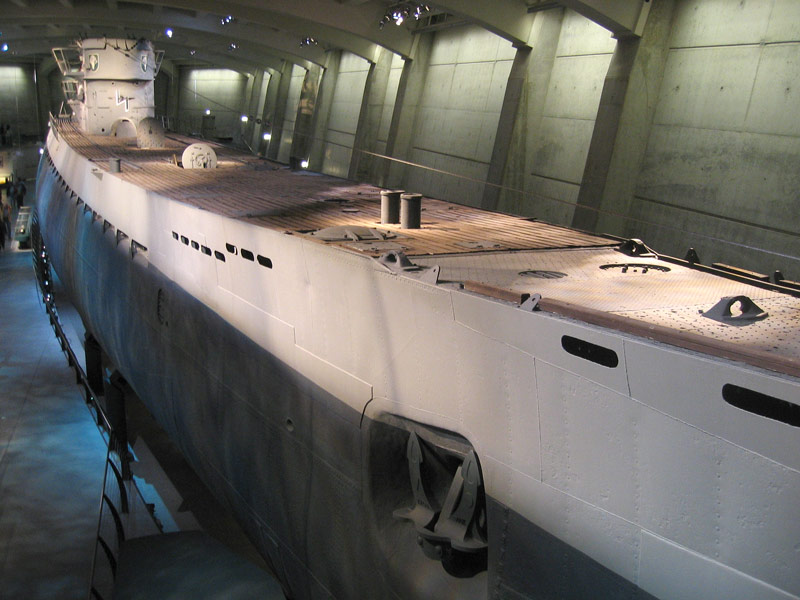
- U-505, a typical Type IXC boat

History

Nazi Germany
- Name: U-173
- Ordered: 23 December 1939
- Builder: DeSchiMAG AG Weser, Bremen
- Yard number: 1013
- Laid down: 21 December 1940
- Launched: 11 August 1941
- Commissioned: 15 November 1941
- Fate: Sunk, 16 November 1942

General characteristics
- Class & type: Type IXC submarine
- Displacement: 1,120 t (1,100 long tons) surfaced; 1,232 t (1,213 long tons) submerged
- Length: 76.76 m (251 ft 10 in) o/a; 58.75 m (192 ft 9 in) pressure hull
- Beam: 6.76 m (22 ft 2 in) o/a; 4.40 m (14 ft 5 in) pressure hull
- Height: 9.60 m (31 ft 6 in)
- Draught: 4.70 m (15 ft 5 in)
- Installed power: 4,400 PS (3,200 kW; 4,300 bhp) (diesels); 1,000 PS (740 kW; 990 shp) (electric)
- Propulsion: 2 shafts; 2 × diesel engines; 2 × electric motors
- Speed: 18.3 knots (33.9 km/h; 21.1 mph) surfaced; 7.3 knots (13.5 km/h; 8.4 mph) submerged
- Range: 13,450 nmi (24,910 km; 15,480 mi) at 10 knots (19 km/h; 12 mph) surfaced; 64 nmi (119 km; 74 mi) at 4 knots (7.4 km/h; 4.6 mph) submerged
- Test depth: 230 m (750 ft)
- Complement: 4 officers, 44 enlisted48 to 56
- Armament: 6 × torpedo tubes (4 bow, 2 stern); 22 × 53.3 cm (21 in) torpedoes; 1 × 10.5 cm (4.1 in) SK C/32 deck gun (180 rounds); 1 × 3.7 cm (1.5 in) SK C/30 AA gun; 1 × twin 2 cm FlaK 30 AA guns

Service record
- Part of: 4th U-boat Flotilla; 15 November 1941 – 30 June 1942; 2nd U-boat Flotilla; 1 July – 16 November 1942
- Identification codes: M 41 495
- Commanders: F.Kapt. Heinz-Ehler Beucke; 15 November 1941 – October 1942; Oblt.z.S. Hans-Adolf Schweichel; October 1942 – 16 November 1942
- Operations: 2 patrols: 1st patrol: 15 June – 20 September 1942; 2nd patrol: 1 – 16 November 1942
- Victories: 1 auxiliary warship sunk (9,359 GRT); 2 auxiliary warships damaged (18,285 GRT); 1 warship damaged (1,630 tons)

German submarine U-173 was a Type IXC U-boat of Nazi Germany's Kriegsmarine during World War II.

She was laid down at the DeSchiMAG AG Weser yard in Bremen as yard number 1013, launched on 11 August 1941 and commissioned on 15 November with Fregattenkapitän Heinz-Ehler Beucke in command.

U-173 began her service career with training as part of the 4th U-boat Flotilla. She was reassigned to the 2nd flotilla for operations on 1 July 1942.

== Design ==
German Type IXC submarines were slightly larger than the original Type IXBs. U-173 had a displacement of 1,120 tonnes (1,100 long tons) when at the surface and 1,232 tonnes (1,213 long tons) while submerged. The U-boat had a total length of 76.76 m (251 ft 10 in), a pressure hull length of 58.75 m (192 ft 9 in), a beam of 6.76 m (22 ft 2 in), a height of 9.60 m (31 ft 6 in), and a draught of 4.70 m (15 ft 5 in). The submarine was powered by two MAN M 9 V 40/46 supercharged four-stroke, nine-cylinder diesel engines producing a total of 4,400 metric horsepower (3,240 kW; 4,340 shp) for use while surfaced, two Siemens-Schuckert 2 GU 345/34 double-acting electric motors producing a total of 1,000 metric horsepower (740 kW; 990 shp) for use while submerged. She had two shafts and two 1.92 m (6 ft 4 in) propellers. The boat was capable of operating at depths of up to 230 metres (750 ft).

The submarine had a maximum surface speed of 18.3 knots (33.9 km/h; 21.1 mph) and a maximum submerged speed of 7.3 knots (13.5 km/h; 8.4 mph). When submerged, the boat could operate for 63 nautical miles (117 km; 72 mi) at 4 knots (7.4 km/h; 4.6 mph); when surfaced, she could travel 13,450 nautical miles (24,910 km; 15,480 mi) at 10 knots (19 km/h; 12 mph). U-173 was fitted with six 53.3 cm (21 in) torpedo tubes (four fitted at the bow and two at the stern), 22 torpedoes, one 10.5 cm (4.13 in) SK C/32 naval gun, 180 rounds, and a 3.7 cm (1.5 in) SK C/30 as well as a 2 cm (0.79 in) C/30 anti-aircraft gun. The boat had a complement of forty-eight.

== Service history ==
=== First patrol ===
The boat departed Kiel on 15 June 1942, moved through the North Sea and negotiated the gap between Iceland and the Faroe Islands. She crossed the Atlantic Ocean and entered the Caribbean Sea. She entered Lorient, on the French Atlantic coast, on 20 September.

=== Second patrol ===
The submarine attempted the disruption of the Operation Torch landings (the invasion of North Africa) on 11 November 1942. She attacked convoy UGF-1 which was at anchor in Fedhala Roads. She hit three ships, sinking USS Joseph Hewes and damaging two more. One of the damaged vessels, the destroyer USS Hambleton, was towed to nearby Casablanca where Seabees cut the ship in two, removed about forty feet (12 m) of hull, then joined the two halves together again; she survived the war.

A few days later and further north, U-173 torpedoed but did not sink USS Electra, on 15 November. This vessel also survived the war, not being broken up until 1974.

=== Loss ===
The boat was sunk by depth charges from the American destroyers Woolsey, Swanson, and Quick in the Atlantic Ocean off Casablanca (33°40′N 7°35′W) on 16 November 1942. All fifty-seven hands were lost.

== Summary of raiding history ==
Date	Name	Nationality	Tonnage (Note: Merchant ship tonnages are in gross register tons. Military vessels are listed by tons displacement.)	Fate
11 November 1942	USS Hambleton	United States Navy	1,630	Damaged
11 November 1942	USS Joseph Hewes	United States Navy	9,359	Sunk
11 November 1942	USS Winooski	United States Navy	10,172	Damaged
15 November 1942	USS Electra	United States Navy	8,113	Damaged

== Bibliography ==
- Gröner, Erich; Jung, Dieter; Maass, Martin (1991). U-boats and Mine Warfare Vessels. German Warships 1815–1945. Vol. 2. Translated by Thomas, Keith; Magowan, Rachel. London: Conway Maritime Press. ISBN 0-85177-593-4.
- Kemp, Paul (1999). U-Boats Destroyed - German Submarine Losses in the World Wars. London: Arms & Armour. ISBN 1-85409-515-3.
