= Quick (automobile) =

Defunct American motor vehicle manufacturer

Quick Manufacturing Company
- Industry: Automotive
- Founded: 1899; 127 years ago
- Defunct: 1900; 126 years ago
- Fate: Sold to Remington Arms
- Headquarters: Patterson and Newark, New Jersey, United States
- Key people: H. M. Quick, E.M. Rodrock, R.E. Horton, F. A. Phelps, Jr.
- Products: Automobiles, Bicycles Engines
- Production output: unknown (1900)

The Quick was a Veteran Era American automobile produced from 1899 to 1900 in Patterson and Newark, New Jersey.

== History ==
H. M. Quick developed the two-seat runabout over a two-year period. F. A. Phelps, Jr. developed the horizontal two-cylinder, chain-driven overhead camshaft engine rated at 4 horsepower. Although in most ways a conventional runabout, it is memorable for being the first American car to use an overhead camshaft unit.

In 1899 production was planned for 1 car per day, but actual production is not known. In 1900 the Quick Manufacturing Company was set-up to build gasoline engines, a patented steering device, the Quick bicycle and the Quick automobile. Burdened by debts, in 1900 the factory was moved from Patterson to Newark. The company sold out to Remington of Ilion, New York in October 1900 - in a deal that was later declared fraudulent.
