= Quickening (disambiguation) =

Quickening is the earliest perception of fetal movement by a mother during pregnancy (both a medical and legal term)

Quickening may also refer to:

- Quickening (Final Fantasy), Final Fantasy XII's incarnation of "Limit Breaks"
- Quickening (Highlander), the transfer of an immortal's life force in the Highlander universe
- Quickening (Angel), a 2001 episode of the television series Angel
- "Quickening" (Movie), the third film in the Rebuild of Evangelion series
- The Quickening (Star Trek: Deep Space Nine), an episode of science fiction television series Star Trek: Deep Space Nine
- Quickening (MacMillan), a 1998 cantata for countertenor, two tenors, two baritones, children's choir, chorus, and orchestra by the Scottish composer James MacMillan.
- Quickening (film), a 2021 film directed by Haya Waseem

== See also ==
- The Quickening (disambiguation)
- Quick (disambiguation)
