= Quickie =

Quickie may refer to:

- Quickie (sexual act), a brief or spontaneous episode of sexual activity
- Quickie (divorce), a divorce obtained in a jurisdiction with few requirements

== Arts and entertainment ==
- The Quickie (film), a 2001 crime film
- The 8TV Quickie, a 15-minute variety show
- The Quickie (novel), a novel by James Patterson
- "Quickie" (Miguel song), 2011
- "Quickie" (Moneybagg Yo song), 2022
- Quickies (album), a 2020 album by The Magnetic Fields

== Brands ==
- Quickie Convenience Stores, an Ottawa-based grocery chain
- Quickie Aircraft, an aircraft manufacturer of the United States
- Rutan Quickie, a light single seat homebuilt aircraft

== People ==
- Vincent Van Quickenborne (born 1973), Belgian politician with that nickname
- "Quickie", common nickname of Donald Driver, American football player

== Other uses ==
- Quickie (joke), a short joke that is used between segments on the children's television series Garfield and Friends
- Daily Quickie, a former column on ESPN.com by Dan Shanoff

== See also ==
- Quicky, rabbit mascot of Nesquik
- Qwiki
- CWCki, pronounced "Quickie"
