= USS Joseph Hewes (AP-50) =

WWII troop ship of the US Navy

Coordinates: 33°40′N 7°30′W

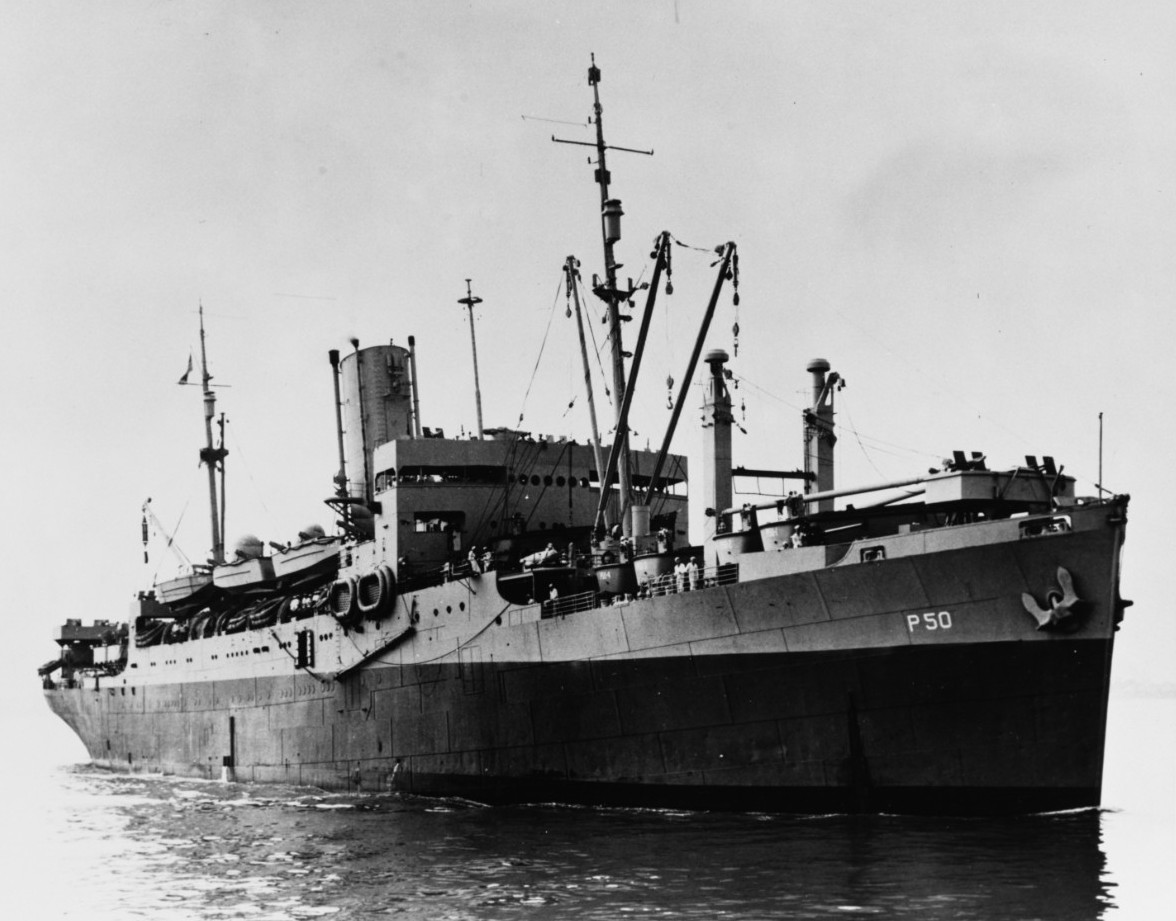
- Joseph Hewes in 1942

History

United States
- Name: Joseph Hewes
- Namesake: Joseph Hewes
- Ordered: as SS Excalibur
- Builder: New York Shipbuilding Co., Camden, New Jersey
- Laid down: 4 November 1929
- Launched: 5 August 1930
- Completed: 18 December 1930
- Acquired: 8 January 1942
- Commissioned: USS Joseph Hewes (AP-50) 1 May 1942
- Stricken: 7 December 1942
- Fate: Sunk 11 November 1942

General characteristics
- Displacement: 14,100 t.
- Length: 450 ft (140 m)
- Beam: 61 ft 6 in (18.75 m)
- Draft: 26 ft 4 in (8.03 m)
- Propulsion: steam turbines
- Speed: 15 knots (28 km/h; 17 mph)
- Complement: 358
- Armament: 1 × single 5 in (130 mm) dual purpose gun mount; 4 × single 3 in (76 mm) gun mounts; 8 × single 20 mm gun mounts

USS Joseph Hewes (AP-50/APA-22), formerly SS Excalibur, was a troop transport for the United States Navy during World War II commanded by Captain Robert McLanahan Smith Jr. A part of the Center Attack Group of Admiral Hewitt's Western Naval Task Force, Operation Torch, Joseph Hewes was sunk on November 11, 1942 by the German submarine U-173 in Fedala Roads off French Morocco coast during the Naval Battle of Casablanca.

== Pre-war history ==
She was built by the New York Shipbuilding Corporation, and launched in 1930 in Camden, New Jersey as the combination passenger-cargo luxury liner SS Excalibur. One of American Export Lines "4 Aces" sister ships — SS Excalibur, SS Exeter, SS Excambion and SS Exochorda — she provided regular service between New York and Europe. SS Excalibur departed on her maiden voyage on January 24, 1931, sailing from New York City to Marseille, Naples, Alexandria, Jaffa, Haifa, Beirut, and then turning back and stopping at Alexandria, Naples, Leghorn, Genoa, Marseille and finally reaching New York. In August 1940, Excalibur diverted from its New York route to carry the Duke and Duchess of Windsor from Lisbon to their Bahamas governorship. On October 3rd, the ship was intercepted by the Royal Navy and H. Montgomery Hyde in Bermuda to confiscate over 500 paintings from the Paris Vollard/Fabiani collection.

On January 8, 1942, Excalibur was acquired by the U.S. Navy and assigned the task of transporting troops to and from battle areas as an AP-class troop transport. She was commissioned on May 1, 1942 as USS Joseph Hewes (AP-50). Her sister ships were also converted for war purposes; out of all original "4 Aces" only the SS Exochorda survived the war.

== World War II ==
After conversion and fitting out, Joseph Hewes sortied from Hampton Roads on October 24, 1942, as part of the Center Attack Group of Admiral Hewitt's Western Naval Task Force en route to French Morocco as part of Operation Torch. She was carrying 80 officers and 1,074 men of the reinforced 3rd Infantry Division, U.S. Army, plus ammunition and supplies.

The transport arrived off Fedhala on November 8, by 0705 hours, landed all troops, and then commenced unloading ammunition and supplies. By November 11, Joseph Hewes had completed cargo unloading and had received 30 casualties from the beach fire.

=== Sinking ===
At 1950 hours she took a torpedo hit in No. 2 hold from U-173. The ship settled by the bow and began filling rapidly with water. Captain Smith endeavored to pick up anchor or slip chain but, as the entire forecastle was under water, this was not possible. He then attempted to beach the ship by backing engines but her propeller was out of the water, so the order was given to abandon ship.

Joseph Hewes went down at 2032 hours, taking Captain Smith and approximately 100 seamen with her. U-173 was sunk five days later off Casablanca by American destroyers.

== Recognition ==
USS Joseph Hewes received for her World War II service Combat Action Ribbon (retroactive, 11 November 1942), American Campaign Medal, Europe-Africa-Middle East Campaign Medal with a battle star, as well as World War II Victory Medal. Prior to her loss, Joseph Hewes had been designated for reclassification in early 1943 as an APA-class attack transport, USS Joseph Hewes (APA-22). Her assigned hull numerical sequence, APA-22, was never reissued to another transport ship. In the 1956 Universal International production Away All Boats, the USS Randall (APA-224) wore hull number APA-22 while standing in as the motion picture's fictional USS Belinda.

Captain Robert Mclanahan Smith Jr., U.S. Naval Academy class of 1919, was posthumously awarded with the Silver Star Medal, the third-highest military decoration for valor awarded to members of the United States Armed Forces. His citation read:

The President of the United States of America takes pride in presenting the Silver Star (Posthumously) to Captain Robert McLanahan Smith, Jr. (NSN: 0-34537), United States Navy, for conspicuous gallantry and intrepidity in action as Commanding Officer of the U.S.S. JOSEPH HEWES (AP-50), when that ship was torpedoed and sunk off Fedala, French Morocco, on 11 November 1942. Captain Smith's remarkable display of command and his exceptional heroism and outstanding devotion to duty at a time when efficient direction and control of the existing situation meant the saving of many lives, were inspirational. The cool, forceful, commanding manner in which he acted and maintained order in an extremely dangerous situation, and the calm inspiring way in which he spoke to his men as he ordered them overboard, gave them confidence, courage and hope. The exemplary conduct of Captain Smith, at the cost of his own life, was in keeping with the highest traditions of the United States Naval Service.

== Namesake ==
The USS Joseph Hewes was named after Joseph Hewes (1730–1779), signer of the Declaration of Independence, who acted as Navy Secretary at the time and supported Navy Captain John Paul Jones, one of the founders of the U.S. Navy.
