= USS Electra (AKA-4) =

Cargo ship of the United States Navy

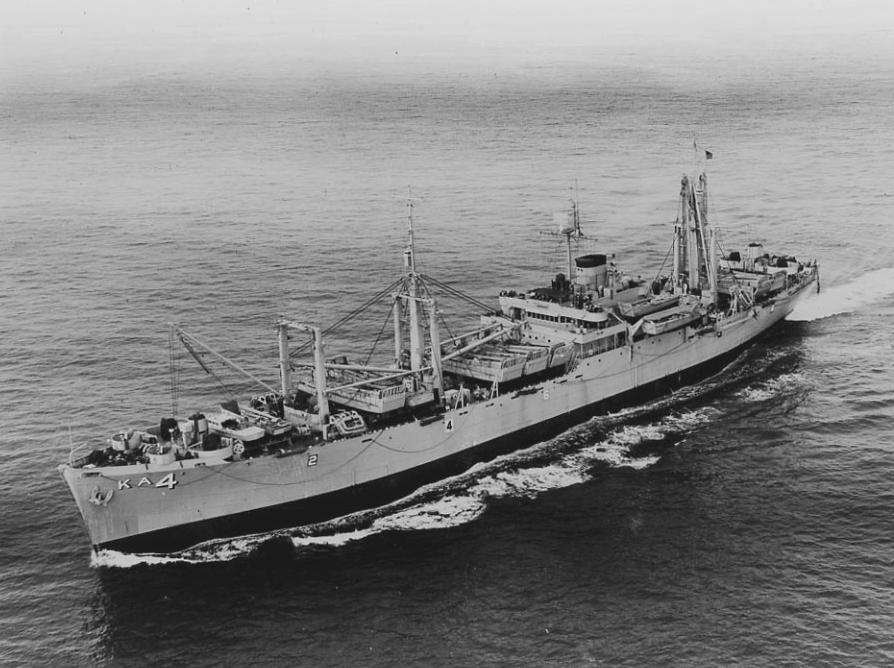
- USS Electra (AKA-4)

History

United States
- Name: USS Electra
- Namesake: Electra, a star in the Pleiades star cluster in the constellation Taurus
- Builder: Tampa Shipbuilding Company, Tampa, Florida
- Laid down: as MV Meteor
- Launched: 18 November 1941
- Acquired: 16 April 1941
- Commissioned: 17 March 1942, as USS Electra (AK-21)
- Decommissioned: 19 March 1946
- Reclassified: AKA-4 (attack cargo ship), 1 February 1943
- Recommissioned: 3 May 1952
- Decommissioned: 13 May 1955
- Honours and awards: 6 battle stars (World War II)
- Fate: Sold for scrap, 7 June 1974

General characteristics
- Class & type: Arcturus-class attack cargo ship
- Type: Type C2 ship
- Displacement: 14,225 long tons (14,453 t)
- Length: 459 ft 1 in (139.93 m)
- Beam: 63 ft (19 m)
- Draft: 20 ft 1 in (6.12 m)
- Speed: 16 knots (30 km/h; 18 mph)
- Complement: 267
- Armament: 1 × 5"/38 caliber gun mount; 4 × 3 in (76 mm) gun mounts

USS Electra (AKA-4) was an Arcturus-class attack cargo ship named after Electra, a star in the Pleiades star cluster in the constellation Taurus. She served as a commissioned ship for seven years.

Electra (AK-21) was launched 18 November 1941 as Meteor by Tampa Shipbuilding Co., Tampa, Fla., under a Maritime Commission contract; sponsored by Mrs. C. O. Andrews, wife of the Senator from Florida; transferred to the Navy 16 April 1941; and commissioned 17 March 1942. She was reclassified AKA-4, 1 February 1943.

== Service history ==
=== World War II ===
After a fast voyage from Norfolk, Va., to Wellington, New Zealand, between 10 May and 18 July 1942, to deliver men of the 1st Marines, Electra, upon her return trained in the Chesapeake Bay with troops assigned to the initial north African landings. On 23 October she sailed for French Morocco and saw action during the invasion landings off Safi on 8 November. Although several of her landing boats were lost under intensive fire from the beach, she unloaded her cargo by the 14th and got underway with wounded soldiers on board. Bound for Fedhala, she was torpedoed on the starboard side by German U-boat U-173 . USS Cole (DD-155) took off all of Electra's crew and passengers except for a ship's salvage party, and with the assistance of several ships, Electra was beached at Casablanca two days later. Her remaining cargo was discharged, and her ship's company with the aid of salvage facilities ashore performed a herculean repair job which enabled her to return to Charleston 30 April 1943.

Following an overhaul and permanent repairs, Electra carried out amphibious training in Chesapeake Bay until the end of the year, then sailed from Norfolk on 11 December 1943 for the Pacific. She departed Pearl Harbor 23 January 1944 for the invasion of the Marshalls, and during the capture of Kwajalein furnished her boats for the occupation of the small islands north of the atoll, and refueled minecraft and small craft of the invasion force. After discharging part of her cargo, she sailed to Eniwetok where she supplied boats and equipment for the initial landings 18 February. After unloading the remainder of her cargo, Electra returned to Pearl Harbor 8 March.

In June 1944, Electra served in the assault landings on Saipan, debarking her troops 15 June and unloading cargo and embarking casualties for return to Pearl Harbor until 26 June. She arrived at Guadalcanal in August to stage for the invasion of the Palaus, and on 15 September took part in the feint assault on Babelthuap to divert attention from the main landings on Peleliu. Two days later she was engaged as control boat for the initial assault on Angaur, remaining there to unload cargo until the 23d.

After a brief respite at Manus, Electra sortied for the invasion of the Philippines, landing her troops and cargo at Tacloban, Leyte, 20 October 1944, sailing 2 days later for the Palaus. She lifted troops from Guam for support landings on 23 November, then sailed to Hollandia, New Guinea, to prepare for the next invasion. On 9 January 1945, Electra arrived at Lingayen Gulf, Luzon for the initial assault, made under air attack, and successfully offloaded her troops and cargo by the 17th. She returned to New Guinea briefly to embark Army troops for transfer to support operations at Mindoro, then sailed to Ulithi, arriving 19 February.

On 18 March 1945, Electra arrived off Iwo Jima to embark men of the fighting 5th Marines for transportation to Pearl Harbor, arriving 15 April. The transport then continued on to the West Coast of the United States for overhaul. When the war ended, Electra was back at Pearl Harbor. She carried occupation troops to Wakayama and Hiro Wan from Pearl Harbor and the Philippines, then embarked returning veterans for the States, arriving at San Francisco 10 November 1945. She was placed out of commission in reserve 19 March 1946, and returned to the Maritime Commission 1 July 1946.

=== Korea ===
Reacquired from the Maritime Commission 16 October 1951 as a result of the Korean War, Electra was recommissioned 3 May 1952. She operated along the West Coast of the United States, taking part in amphibious exercises and acting as a submarine target vessel. In June 1953 she loaded cargo at Long Beach for a supply mission in the Arctic, then sailed from Seattle 10 July with TF 9 to arrive at Icy Cape on the 21st. Electra furnished provisions, fuel, and water to other ships in the force, as well as unloading cargo for northern bases. She returned to San Diego 2 September, and except for a supply mission to the Pribilof Islands from 10 July to 7 September 1954, Electra continued training and upkeep along the west coast until placed out of commission in reserve again 13 May 1955. Electra was sold for scrap on 7 June 1974 to Van Komodo International Inc.

Electra received six battle stars for World War II service.
