= USS Joseph Hewes =

USS Joseph Hewes may refer to the following ships of the United States Navy:

- USS Joseph Hewes (AP-50), was acquired by the US Navy 8 January 1942 and sunk 11 November 1942
- USS Joseph Hewes (FF-1078), was a Knox-class frigate launched 7 March 1970 and transferred to Taiwan in 1999
