= USS Quick =

Gleaves-class destroyer

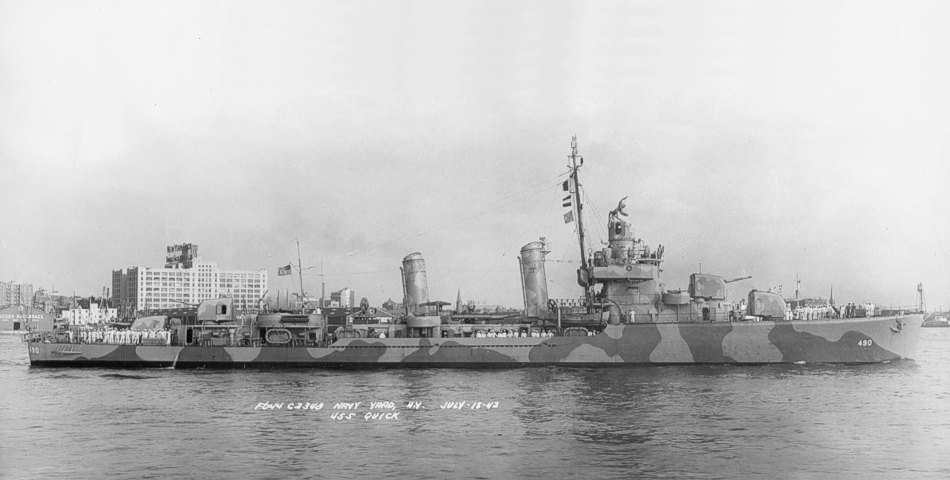
- USS Quick (DD-490)

History

United States
- Name: Quick
- Namesake: John H. Quick
- Builder: Federal Shipbuilding and Drydock Company
- Laid down: 3 November 1941
- Launched: 3 May 1942
- Commissioned: 3 July 1942
- Identification: DD-490
- Reclassified: DMS-32, 23 June 1945
- Decommissioned: 28 May 1949
- Stricken: 15 January 1972
- Fate: Sold 27 August 1973 for scrapping

General characteristics
- Class & type: Gleaves-class destroyer
- Displacement: 1,630 tons
- Length: 348 ft 3 in (106.15 m)
- Beam: 36 ft 1 in (11.00 m)
- Draft: 11 ft 10 in (3.61 m)
- Propulsion: 50,000 shp (37,000 kW); 4 boilers; 2 propellers
- Speed: 37.4 knots (69 km/h)
- Range: 6,500 nmi (12,000 km; 7,500 mi) at 12 kn (22 km/h; 14 mph)
- Complement: 16 officers, 260 enlisted
- Armament: 4 × 5 in (127 mm) dual purpose guns, 4 × Bofors 40 mm guns, 6 × Oerlikon 20 mm cannons, 5 × 21 in (533 mm) torpedo tubes, 2 × depth charge tracks

USS Quick (DD-490/DMS-32), a Gleaves-class destroyer, was a United States Navy warship named for Sergeant Major John H. Quick (1870–1922), who received the Medal of Honor "for gallantry in action" at Guantanamo Bay, Cuba, 14 June 1898, during the Spanish–American War.

Quick was laid down by the Federal Shipbuilding and Dry Dock Co., Kearny, New Jersey on 3 November 1941. The ship was completed and launched on 3 May 1942; sponsored by Mrs. William T. Roy, niece of Sergeant Major Quick. She was commissioned on 3 July 1942.

== Service history ==
Following her initial shakedown off the coast of New England and the Maritime Provinces, Quick departed New York, 6 September 1942, for the Caribbean Sea and the Gulf of Mexico. Assigned to escort work, she accompanied United States Army transports and merchantmen as they plied the Gulf and West Indian shipping lanes — lanes which in preceding months had suffered the greatest losses to U-boat activities in the eastern Atlantic Ocean.

In October, Quick left the Gulf and steamed to Norfolk, Virginia where she joined Task Force 34 (TF 34) on 23 October and steamed east. Just before midnight on 7 November, she arrived off the coast of Safi, Morocco, and took up station in the transport area for the Southern Attack Group of Operation TORCH the invasion of North Africa. During the landings the following day, she provided gunfire support, then resumed anti-aircraft and anti-submarine duties. On 14 November, she shifted to Casablanca and two days later assisted in sinking U-173. On the 17th, she got underway for the United States and at the end of the month anchored in New York Harbor. She resumed escort work and for the next six months guarded coastal and trans-Atlantic convoys.

On 8 June 1943, Quick departed the east coast with TF 65, bound for North Africa. Arriving at Mers-el-Kebir on 22 June, she joined TF 85 and on 5 July sailed for Sicily and Operation HUSKY. From 10 to 13 July, she cruised off Scoglitti and along the Camerina plain, providing fire support for the U.S. 7th Army's assault troops. She then returned to escort work in the North Atlantic until May 1944, and on Mediterranean runs until the end of the war in Europe.

The war in the Pacific Ocean continued, however, and, as Allied forces pushed closer to the Japanese home islands, their need for minesweepers increased, doubly so with the toll among that type in the Ryukyus. Quick, no longer needed for escort work in the Atlantic, was designated to help fill the need, and on 13 June 1945, she entered the Charleston Naval Shipyard where she became a destroyer-minesweeper. Emerging from conversion on 2 August as DMS-32 (effective 23 June 1945), she sailed for the west coast, arriving at San Diego after the cessation of Pacific hostilities.

Toward the end of September, she sailed for Pearl Harbor, thence to Eniwetok for abbreviated operations after which she returned to Hawaii. On 2 December 1946, she headed west again, arriving at Sasebo on 16 December for a nine-month tour during which she operated off the China coast and off Okinawa in addition to working in Japanese waters. Spending a little over a month on the west coast, she operated in the Marianas from December 1946 to February 1947, then returned to Japanese waters. In April 1947 she resumed operations in the Trust Territories and in August returned to the west coast. The following spring she deployed to the Marshall Islands and Marianas for another three months, returning to San Diego on 4 June.

Eight months later she was designated for inactivation and, on 1 March 1949, she reported to Commander, Pacific Reserve Fleet, decommissioning 28 May 1949. Reclassified DD-490 on 15 July 1955, Quick was stricken from the Naval Vessel Register on 15 January 1972, sold on 27 August 1973 and broken up for scrap.

== Awards ==
Quick earned four battle stars during World War II.
