= List of Empire ships (Th–Ty) =

== Suffix beginning with T ==
=== Empire Thackeray ===
Empire Thackeray was a 2,865 GRT cargo ship built by Sir J Laing & Sons Ltd, Sunderland. Launched on 1 July 1942 and completed in August 1942. Sold in 1945 to Rodney Steamship Co Ltd and renamed Thackeray. Operated under the management of Anglo-Danubian Transport Co Ltd, London. She ran aground on 27 December 1946 near Outer Cat Island, Argentia, Newfoundland. Refloated on 24 May 1947 and repaired at St John's, Newfoundland. Sold in 1948 to M S Polemis, Greece and rename Theokeetor. Operated under the management of Goulandris Brothers Ltd, Greece. Sold in 1953 to Compagnia Commercial Tansatlantica SA, Panama and renamed Mozart. Operated under the management of S Polemis & Sons Ltd, New York. Sold in 1954 to Compagnia Navigazione Micaela SA and renamed Micaela. Operated under the management of Società Armamento Marittimo, Italy. Renamed Onorato Secondo in 1960. Sold in 1962 to Polska Zegluga Morska, Poland and renamed Jelcz. Scrapped in May 1968 at Ystad Sweden.

=== Empire Thames ===
Empire Thames was a 5,825 GRT ocean liner built by Blohm & Voss, Hamburg. Completed in 1920 as Urundi for Deutsche Ost Afrika Linie, Hamburg. Requisitioned in 1939 by the Kriegsmarine. Between February and May 1945, she carried 32,716 people from the Eastern Baltic and East Prussia. Seized in May 1945 at Copenhagen. To MoWT and renamed Empire Thames. Chartered in 1945 to the Greek Government and renamed Kalamai. Returned to MoT in 1946 and renamed Empire Thames. Sold in 1947 to Goulandris Bros, London. Sold in 1948 to Compagnia Maritima de Este, Panama and renamed Valparaiso. Renamed Empire Thames in 1949, scrapped in March 1949 at Antwerp, Belgium.

=== Empire Thane ===
Empire Thane was an 8,120 GRT tanker built by Lithgows Ltd, Port Glasgow. Launched on 26 October 1939 as Desmoulea for Anglo-Saxon Petroleum Co Ltd and completed in December 1939. Torpedoed on 31 January 1941 in the Mediterranean Sea (35°31′N 02°34′E) and abandoned. Reboarded and towed to Souda Bay, Crete where most of her cargo was discharged. Towed to Port Said, Egypt in April 1941 and then to Suez. Damaged on 5 August 1941 by an aerial torpedo off West Beacon, Suez. Departed Suez on 18 August under tow of Olivia and arrived at Aden on 27 August. Examined and was found to have broken her back, with her engine room full of water and unable to steer. Departed Aden on 30 December under tow of Malda and arrived at Bombay on 12 January 1942 for drydocking. A drydock was unavailable and departed Bombay on 23 April under tow of Ondina. Arrived at Bhavnagar, India on 1 May. Damage was not repairable there and she was beached, with further strained her. Departed under tow of Utsire on 20 November but the tow rope parted on 22 November and she ran aground at Goapnath Point. Refloated on 26 November and towed back to Bombay. Relegated to use as an oil hulk. Finally dry-docked in July 1943, repairs were assessed as possible, but materials were unavailable as two of the ships carrying them had been sunk en route. Temporary repairs were carried out. To MoWT and renamed Empire Thane. Towed to Cochin and used as an oil hulk. Returned to Anglo-Saxon Petroleum Ltd in January 1947 and was renamed Desmoulea. Departed Cochin on 21 April under tow and arrived at Falmouth, Cornwall on 16 July, thus completing in excess of 12,000 nautical miles (22,000 km) under tow. Repaired and returned to service. Scrapped in 1961 in Hong Kong.

=== Empire Thistle ===
Empire Thistle was a 263 GRT tug built by Clelands (Successors) Ltd, Willington Quay-on-Tyne. Launched on 21 October 1941 and completed in February 1942. Sold in 1946 to Clyde Shipping Co Ltd and renamed Flying Hurricane. Sold in 1956 to Britannia Steam Towing Co and renamed Brynforth. Sold in 1962 to Alexandra Towing Co Ltd. Scrapped in August 1965 at Silloth, Cumberland.

=== Empire Thrush ===
Empire Thrush was a 6,160 GRT cargo ship built by Federal Shipbuilding Co, Kearny, New Jersey. Launched on 17 April 1919 as Lorain for United States Shipping Board (USSB). Completed in May 1919. To Cosmopolitan Shipping Co, New York in 1932 and returned to USSB later that year. To MoWT in 1942 and renamed Empire Thrush. Torpedoed on 14 April 1942 and sunk by U-203 off Chesapeake Bay, USA (35°08′N 75°18′W).

=== Empire Thunder ===
Empire Thunder was a 5,965 GRT cargo ship built by William Pickersgill & Sons Ltd, Sunderland. Launched on 6 August 1940 and completed in January 1941. Torpedoed on maiden voyage and sunk by U-124 north-west of the Hebrides (59°14′N 12°43′W).

=== Empire Tide ===
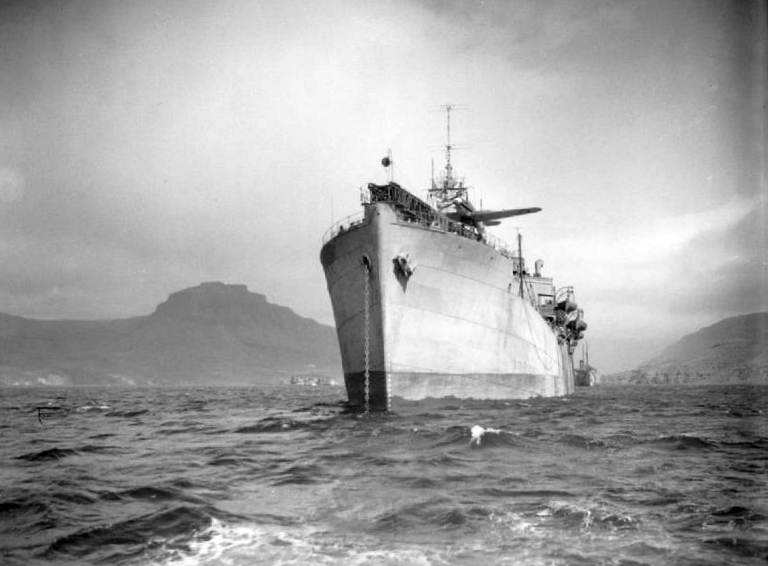
Empire Tide

Empire Tide was a 6,978 GRT CAM ship which was built by Lithgows Ltd, Port Glasgow. Launched on 27 May 1941 and completed in October 1941. Sold in 1945 to Ropner Shipping Co Ltd and renamed Thirlby. Sold in 1956 to Transportes Maritimos Atlas Sa, Panama and renamed Guri. Sold in 1963 to Panamanian Oriental Steamship Corp, Panama and renamed Anto. Operated under the management of World-Wide Shipping Ltd. Sold in 1965 to Eastern Giant Navigation Co Ltd, Bahamas, remaining under World-Wide's management. Sold in 1966 to Apollo Shipping Co SA, Panama. Scrapped in November 1966 at Ikeda, Japan.

=== Empire Tigachi ===
Empire Tigachi was a 685 GRT coastal tanker built by Elsflether Werft AG, Elsfleth, Germany. Completed in 1942 as Flemhude for the Kriegsmarine. Seized in May 1945, to MoWT and renamed Empire Tigachi. She ran aground on 3 January 1946 at Nidingen, Sweden. The wreck stripped by salvors later broke in two and declared a total loss.

=== Empire Tigarth ===
Empire Tigarth was the intended name of a 312 GRT coastal tanker built in 1941 as Swine for the Kriegsmarine. Seized in May 1945 at Copenhagen. To MoWT, intended to be renamed Empire Tigarth but allocated to USSR in 1946. No further trace.

=== Empire Tigaven ===
Empire Tigaven was a 972 GRT tanker built by Deutsche Werft, Hamburg. Completed in 1937 as Algol for Trelleborgs Angfabrik Nya A/B, Sweden. Hit a mine on 13 December 1939 and sank between Trelleborg and Falsterbo. Salvaged in 1940 in two parts, sold and rebuilt. Sold in 1941 to O Wallenius, Stockholm and renamed Soya VII. Sold in 1942 to J T Essberger, Hamburg and renamed Algol. Requisitioned in 1942 by the Kriegsmarine. Seized in May 1945 at Arendal, Norway. To MoWT and renamed Empire Tigaven. Sold in 1947 to Metcalfe Motor Coasters Ltd and renamed Peter M. Sold in 1964 to N E Vernicos Ltd, Greece and renamed Motol 5. Sold in 1969 to D & C Vernicos Ltd, Greece. Scrapped in March 1972 at Perama, Greece.

=== Empire Tigawa ===
Empire Tigawa was the intended name of a 633 GRT coastal tanker which was built by D W Kremer Sohn, Elmshorn, Germany. Completed on 6 April 1940 as Anna for the Kriegsmarine. Seized in May 1945 at Kristiansand, Norway. To MoWT, the name Empire Tigawa was allocated but she was stranded on 27 December 1945 at Bolsax, Kattegat and was badly damaged. Refloated and sailed to Kalundborg, Denmark. Declared a constructive total loss. Towed to Burntisland, Fife and reported sold to a Norwegian buyer. Renamed Ardeche. Removed from shipping registers in 1959.

=== Empire Tigbart ===
Empire Tigbart was a 679 GRT coastal tanker which was built by Danziger Werft AG, Danzig. Completed in 1936 as Poel for the Kriegsmarine. Seized in May 1945 at Kiel. To MoWT and renamed Empire Tigbart. Allocated in 1946 to USSR and renamed Koktebel. On shipping registers until 1970.

=== Empire Tiger ===
Empire Tiger was a 4,886 GRT cargo ship which was built by Todd Drydock and Construction Company, Tacoma, Washington. Completed in 1919 as Orcus for USSB. Sold in 1923 to Grace Steamship Company, New York and renamed Coya. To MoWT in 1940 and renamed Empire Tiger. Last reported on 27 February 1941 in the Atlantic bound for the Clyde.

=== Empire Tigina ===
Empire Tigina was a 638 GRT coastal tanker which was built by D W Kremer Sohn, Elmshorn. Launched in 1940 as Else for the Kriegsmarine and completed on 25 July 1941. Seized in May 1945 at Trondheim, Norway. To MoWT and renamed Empire Tigina. Allocated in 1946 to USSR. Deleted from shipping registers in 1959.

=== Empire Tigity ===
Empire Tigity was a 465 GRT coastal tanker which was built by H Peters, Beidenfleth, Germany. Completed in 1944 as Gohren for the Kriegsmarine. Seized in May 1945, to MoWT as Empire Tigity. Sold in 1947 to Metcalfe Motor Coasters Ltd and renamed Anthony M. New diesel engines fitted in 1953. Sold in 1970 to Effluent Services Ltd, Macclesfield, Cheshire and renamed Kinder. Scrapped in April 1983 at Garston, Merseyside.

=== Empire Tiglas ===
Empire Tiglas was the intended name of a 510 GRT coastal tanker which was built in 1942 as Danisch Wold. Seized in May 1945 in the Channel Islands. To MoWT, intended to be renamed Empire Tiglas but allocated in 1946 to the Dutch Government and renamed Elst. Classed as a lighter in 1947, managed by Van Ommeren NV on behalf of the Dutch Government.

=== Empire Tigness ===
Empire Tigness was a 407 GRT coastal tanker which was built by Greifenwerft AG, Stettin. Completed in 1943 as Georg for the Kriegsmarine. Seized in May 1945 at Flensburg. To MoWT and renamed Empire Tigness. Used as a salvage ship recovering the PLUTO pipeline 1947–49. Sold in 1949 to Risdon, Beazley & Co, Southampton and renamed Topmast No 15. Sold in 1959 to Dutch buyers, renamed Phito in 1959 and converted to a barge.

=== Empire Tigombo ===
Empire Tigombo was a 604 GRT coastal tanker which was built by Greifenwerft AG, Stettin. Completed in 1944 as Howacht for the Kriegsmarine. Seized in May 1945 at Kiel. To MoWT and renamed Empire Tigombo. Allocated in 1946 to USSR and renamed Utrish. Scrapped in 1968.

=== Empire Tigonto ===
Empire Tigonto was a 664 GRT coastal tanker which was built by D W Kremer Sohn, Elmshorn. Completed in 1940 as Dora for the Kriegsmarine. Seized in May 1945 at Flensburg. To MoWT and renamed Empire Tigonto. Allocated in 1946 to USSR, deleted from shipping registers in 1959.

=== Empire Tigoon ===
Empire Tigoon was a 674 GRT coastal tanker which was built by Wilton-Fijenoord, Schiedam, Netherlands. Completed in 1944 as Steingrund for the Kriegsmarine. Seized in May 1945 at Kiel. To MoWT and renamed Empire Tigoon. Allocated in 1946 to the Greek Government and renamed Xanthi. Transferred to the Royal Hellenic Navy in 1956 and renamed Vaviis, pennant number (A-471). Stricken in 1989.

=== Empire Tigosti ===
Empire Tigosti was the intended name of a 638 GRT coastal tanker which was built in 1942 as Hilde for the Kriegsmarine. Seized in May 1945 at Kristiansand, Norway. To MoWT, intended to be renamed Empire Tigosti but allocated in 1946 to USSR.

=== Empire Tigouver ===
Empire Tigouver was a 664 GRT coastal tanker which was built by D W Kremer Sohn, Elmshorn. Completed in 1942 as Grete for the Kriegsmarine. Seized in May 1945, to MoWT and renamed Empire Tigouver. Allocated in 1946 to USSR and renamed Gret. Deleted from shipping registers in 1959.

=== Empire Tilbury ===
Empire Tilbury was a 7,312 GRT cargo ship which was built by William Doxford & Sons Ltd, Sunderland. Launched on 9 July 1945 and completed in December 1945. Sold in 1946 to Hain Steamship Co Ltd and renamed Trevean. Sold in 1957 to Peninsular & Oriental Steam Navigation Co Ltd and resold to Hain's later that year. Sold in 1963 to East Asia Navigation Co, Hong Kong and renamed East Lion. Renamed Kawana in 1964. On 2 June 1966, she caught fire in the Chittagong Roads, East Pakistan and was beached near the Norman Point Light where she broke in two and was declared a total loss.

=== Empire Tintagel ===
Empire Tintagel was a 493 GRT coastal tanker which was built in Japan as JAP No 4000. Seized in 1945, to MoWT and renamed MTS No 12. Renamed Empire Tintagel in 1947. Sold in 1951 to Chan Cheng Kum, Singapore and renamed Hua Li. Sold in 1970 to Compass Agencies Private Ltd, Singapore. Sold in 1974 to Lawrence Shipping Co, Panama and renamed Kim Hua Li. Sank on 28 December 1975 in the South China Sea (02°19′N 109°01′E).

=== Empire Titan ===
Empire Titan was a 244 GRT tug which was built by Henry Scarr Ltd, Hessle, Yorkshire. Launched on 29 June 1942 and completed in October 1942. Sold in 1947 to the Government Railways, Gold Coast and renamed Titan. Sold in 1957 to H P Lenaghan & Sons Ltd, Belfast and renamed Lenadee. Sold in 1959 to C Picciotto fu Giuseppe, Italy and renamed Pionere. Capsized and sank on 30 November 1966 at Messina while assisting Guglielmo Marconi. Refloated on 22 January 1967, repaired and returned to service.

=== Empire Titania ===
Empire Titania was a 258 GRT tug which was built by Scott & Sons, Bowling, West Dunbartonshire. Launched on 21 December 1942 and completed in July 1943. To the Admiralty in 1947 and renamed Vagrant. Sold in 1968 to C Picciotto fu Gillseppe, Italy and renamed Zancle. Scrapped in December 1987 at Spezia.

=== Empire Tobago ===
Empire Tobago was a 7,320 GRT cargo ship which was built by Bartram & Sons Ltd, Sunderland. Launched on 28 May 1945 and completed in October 1945. Sold in 1947 to Counties Ship Management Co Ltd and renamed Crowborough Hill. Sold in 1951 to A Crawford & Co Ltd, Glasgow and renamed Gryfevale. Sold in 1955 to Sterling Shipping Co Ltd and renamed Sterling Valour. Sold in 1958 to G Bozzo, Italy and renamed Madda Primo then Madda Bozzo. Sold in 1963 to Seastar Shipping Corporation, Somali Republic and renamed Kriss. Arrived on 21 February 1968 at Kaohsiung, Taiwan for scrapping.

=== Empire Toby ===
Empire Toby was a 138 GRT tug which was built by Richard Dunston Ltd, Thorne, Yorkshire. Launched on 8 July 1942 and completed in August 1942. Sold in 1947 to Union de Remorquage d'Ocean, St Nazaire and renamed Croisic I. Sold in 1965 to Société Remorquage Mir-Demos, St Nazaire. Sold in 1969 to Société Algero-Provençale de Remorquage, France. Scrapped in December 1973 at Spezia, Italy.

=== Empire Toiler ===
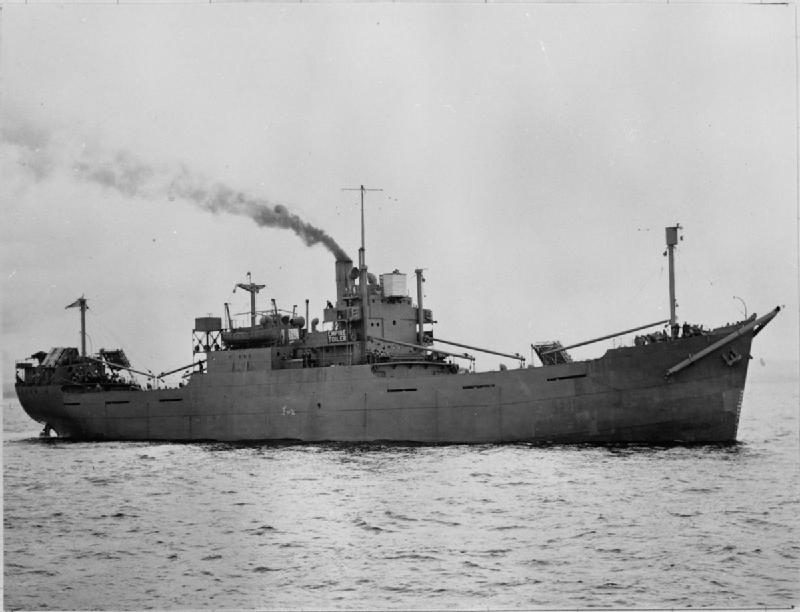
Empire Toiler

Empire Toiler was a 2,932 GRT cargo ship which was built by Ailsa Shipbuilding Co Ltd, Troon, Ayrshire. Launched on 15 April 1942 and completed in June 1942. Allocated in 1943 to the Dutch Government and renamed Van Ostade. Sold in 1947 to Koninklijke Nederlands Stoomboot Maatschappij. Sold in 1950 to Tanfield Steamship Co Ltd, Newcastle upon Tyne and renamed Etal Manor. Sold in 1955 to Pelton Steamship Co Ltd, Newcastle upon Tyne and renamed Moto. Sold in 1960 to Teulada SpA di Navigazione, Italy and renamed Tirso. Operated under the management of O Rosini, Italy. Sold in 1962 to Compagnia Navigazione General SA, Italy and renamed Hamal. Operated under the management of N Patella, Italy. Scrapped in May 1969 at Trieste.

=== Empire Torrent ===
Empire Torrent was a 7,076 GRT cargo ship which was built by Harland & Wolff Ltd, Glasgow. Launched on 29 October 1942 and completed in December 1942. Sold in 1948 to Ernels Shipping Co Ltd and renamed Argos Hill. Operated under the management of Counties Ship Management Co Ltd, London. Sold in 1951 to Queen Line Ltd and renamed Queen Maud. Operated under the management of T Dunlop & Sons, Glasgow. Sold in 1954 to Nueva Valencia Compagnia Navigazione SA, Panama and renamed Scotia. Operated under the management of N J Goulandris Ltd, London. Renamed Skotia in 1960 and reflagged to Greece. Scrapped in July 1962 in Hong Kong.

=== Empire Torridge ===
Empire Torridge was a 4,050 GRT cargo ship which was built by Burntisland Shipbuilding Co Ltd, Burntisland. Completed in 1923 as Asiatic. Sold in 1942 to Hunter Shipping Co, London. She ran aground on 21 January 1942 at North Bay, Tara Co. Down and abandoned. Refloated on 2 April 1942 and temporary repairs carried out. Towed to Belfast on 9 April but declared a constructive total loss. To MoWT in 1943, repaired and renamed Empire Torridge. Sold in 1946 to Fred Hunter (Management) Ltd and renamed Huntress. Sold in 1950 to August Paulin, Finland and rename Modesta. Scrapped in July 1962 at Split, Yugoslavia.

=== Empire Toucan ===
Empire Toucan was a 4,421 GRT cargo ship which was built by Federal Shipbuilding & Drydock Co, Kearny, New Jersey. Completed in 1920 as Freeport Sulphur No 5 for the Freeport Sulphur Transportation Co and sold to William Reardon-Smith Ltd, Cardiff in February 1940. To MoWT in 1940 and renamed Empire Toucan. Torpedoed on 29 June 1940 and sunk by U-47 south west of Ireland (49°20′N 13°52′W).

=== Empire Tourist ===
Empire Tourist was a 7,064 GRT cargo ship which was built by Bartram & Sons Ltd, Sunderland. Launched on 17 July 1943 and completed in October 1943. Torpedoed on 4 March 1944 and sunk by U-703 south-east of Bear Island (73°25′N 22°11′E) while a member of Convoy RA 57.

=== Empire Tower ===
Empire Tower was a 4,378 GRT cargo ship which was built by Burntisland Shipbuilding Co Ltd, Burntisland. Completed in 1935 as Roxburgh. Sold in 1937 to Tower Steamship co and renamed Tower Field. Operated under the management of Counties Ship Management Co Ltd, London. Damaged by bombing on 10 May 1941 off the Outer Dowsing Buoy, Thames Estuary. Repaired, but ran aground on 19 October 1941 in the Workington Channel while entering port at Hull and broke in two. Refloated and repaired, to MoWT in 1942 and renamed Empire Tower. Torpedoed on 5 March 1943 and sunk by U-130 north-west of Lisbon (43°50′N 14°46′W) while a member of Convoy XK 2.

=== Empire Townsman ===
Empire Townsman was a 313 GRT coaster which was built by Richard Dunston Ltd, Thorne. Launched on 26 May 1943 and completed in August 1943. Sold in 1947 to W D Tamlyn & Co Ltd and renamed Roselyne. Sold in 1953 to Fowey Harbour Commissioners, Fowey and renamed Lantyan. Sold in 1964 to Seaborne Aggregate Co Ltd, Southampton. Converted to a suction dredger and renamed Pen Arun. Sold in 1970 to Amey Marine Ltd, Southampton. Sold in 1974 to Dale Sany & Gravel Co Ltd, Guernsey and renamed Sir Cedric. Sold in 1976 to Roselyon Shipping Co, Guernsey. Sold in 1978 to Société Private Derrien-Bichue, France.

=== Empire Towy ===
Empire Towy was a 2,754 GRT cargo ship which was built by Flensburger Schiffbau-Gesellschaft, Flensburg. Launched in 1943, seized in May 1945 in an incomplete state. Completed in 1947 as Empire Towy for MoT, Sold to Fenton Steamship Co subject to condemnation by Prize Court. Renamed Empire Patrai in 1950. Sold in 1953 to Hellenic Lines, Greece and renamed Patrai. Sold in 1981 to Celika Navigation Co, Cyprus. Sold in 1983 to Crystal Breese Corp. Operated under the management of Roussos Bros, Greece. Scrapped in 1984 in Perama, Greece.

=== Empire Trader ===
Empire Trader was a 9,965 GRT cargo ship which was built by Workman, Clark & Co Ltd, Belfast. Completed in 1908 as Tainui for Shaw, Savill & Albion Ltd. Torpedoed on 8 April 1918 and abandoned. Later reboarded and towed to Falmouth. Sold for scrapping in 1939, sale revoked by Government Order. To MoWT in 1940 and renamed Empire Trader. Torpedoed on 21 February 1942 and damaged by U-92 while a member of Convoy ON 166. Escorted towards the Azores by HMCS Dauphin but sunk by her at 48°27′N 29°47′W as a result of orders received from the Admiralty. Crew rescued by convoy rescue ship Stockport, which was sunk by U-604 on 23 February with the loss of all on board.

=== Empire Trail ===
Empire Trail was a 7,038 GRT cargo ship which was built by Shipbuilding Corporation Ltd, Sunderland. Launched on 19 August 1943 and completed in December 1943. Sold in 1947 to Steamship Mombasa Co Ltd and renamed Trail. Operated under the management of Maclay & McIntyre Ltd. Sold in 1951 to Maclay & McIntyre Ltd and renamed Loch Maddy. Sold in 1960 to Panamanian Oriental Steamship Corp and renamed Ocean Glory. Operated under the management of Wheelock, Marden & Co, Hong Kong. Laid up in Hong Kong from 28 August 1962 with propeller damage. On 2 September 1962 she broke free from her moorings in Typhoon Wanda and collided with Grosvenor Navigator. Sold in 1963 to Japanese breakers for scrapping.

=== Empire Traveller ===
Empire Traveller was an 8,201 GRT tanker built by Harland & Wolff Ltd, Belfast. Launched on 29 June 1943 and completed in October 1943. To the French Government in 1946 and renamed Pechelbronn. Sold in 1956 to African Carriers Corporation and renamed Eagle. Operated under the management of J A Galani, Paris. Sold in 1959 to Maritenia Shipping Co Ltd and renamed Jajce. Operated under the management of the Yugoslavian Government. Sold in 1963 to Jugoslavenska Tankerska Plovidba, remaining under Yugoslavian Government management. Scrapped in January 1969 at Valencia, Spain.

=== Empire Treasure ===
Empire Treasure was a 7,022 GRT cargo ship which was built by Lithgows Ltd, Port Glasgow. Launched on 28 December 1942 and completed in March 1943. On 15 January 1944, her stern frame fractured in a storm while she was a member of a convoy. A propeller blade was lost and her rudder rendered inoperative. The other blades were then lost too. She drifted for three days maintaining radio silence before requesting assistance. The tug Bustler was despatched by the Admiralty, and she arrived in the Bristol Channel on 29 January. Sold in 1946 to Donaldson Line Ltd and renamed Gracia. Sold in 1954 to Blue Star Line and renamed Oregon Star. Sold in 1955 to Williamson & Co Ltd, Hong Kong and renamed Inchleana. Sold in 1966 to National Shipping Corporation, Pakistan and renamed Tetulia. Scrapped in 1969 at Chittagong, East Pakistan.

=== Empire Trent ===
Empire Trent was a 5,006 GRT cargo ship which was built by William Gray & Co Ltd, West Hartlepool. Completed in 1927 as Rockpool for Sir R Ropner & Sons. She ran aground on 1 February 1941 on Little Cumbrae Island and declared a constructive total loss. To MoWT in 1941 and renamed Empire Trent. Sold in 1946 to Union Steamship Company of South Africa and renamed General George Brink. Sold in 1947 to Arcturus Steamship Corp, Panama and renamed Africana. Scrapped in November 1959 at Osaka, Japan.

=== Empire Trinidad ===
Empire Trinidad was an 8,130 GRT cargo ship which was built by Blythswood Shipbuilding Co Ltd, Glasgow. Launched on 10 July 1945 and completed in November 1945. Sold in 1946 to Bear Creek Oil & Shipping co Ltd and renamed Regent Lion. Operated under the management of C T Bowring & Co Ltd. Sold in 1950 to Bowring Steamship Co Ltd, remaining under C T Bowring's management. Renamed Camillo in 1955. Arrived on 7 January 1960 at Faslane, Argyllshire for scrapping.

=== Empire Tristram ===
Empire Tristram was a 7,167 GRT cargo ship which was built by J L Thompson & Sons Ltd, Sunderland. Launched on 6 April 1942 and completed in July 1942. Damaged on 23 June 1944 by a V-1 flying bomb at Surrey Commercial Docks, London. Damaged on 12 July 1944 at Surrey Commercial Docks in an air raid, towed to Blyth, Northumberland for repairs. Sold in 1946 to Denholm Line Steamers Ltd and renamed Hollypark. Operated under the management of J & J Denholm Ltd. Sold in 1955 to Buchanan Shipping Co Ltd and renamed Gogovale. Operated under the management of Crawford & Co Ltd, Glasgow. Sold in 1957 to Aviation & Shipping Co Ltd and renamed Avisvale. Operated under the management of Purvis Shipping Co Ltd, London. Sold in 1961 to Compagnia Navigazione Marcasa SA, Panama and renamed St Nicolas. Operated under the management of S Catsell & Co Ltd, London. Arrived on 28 January 1967 at Split, Yugoslavia for scrapping.

=== Empire Trooper ===
Empire Trooper was a 14,106 GRT ocean liner which was built by Vulkan Werke, Hamburg. Completed in 1922 as Cap Norte for Hamburg Südamerikanische Dampfschiffahrts-Gesellschaft. Chartered in 1932 to Norddeutscher Lloyd and renamed Sierra Salvada, returned to Hamburg Süd in 1934 and renamed Cap Norte. When war was declared, she was homeward bound from Pernambuco, Brazil. Her passengers were disembarked in Lisbon. She was painted to represent a Swedish ship, carrying Swedish colours and renamed Ancona. Departed for Germany via a circuitous route but spotted on 9 October 1939 by HMS Belfast north-west of the Faroe Islands in rough weather. Her captain surrendered her and she was escorted to Scapa Flow. Used as a blockship there until HMS Royal Oak was torpedoed there and served that purpose. To MoWT in 1940 and renamed Empire Trooper, converted to a troopship. Damaged on 25 December 1940 by shelling from Admiral Hipper, which was driven off by HMS Berwick. Refitted in 1946, and again in 1950. Arrived on 9 April 1955 at Southampton on her last trooping duty from Hong Kong. Scrapped in September 1955 at Inverkeithing, Fife.

=== Empire Trophy ===
Empire Trophy was a 5,211 GRT tanker which was built by Cantiere Navali Riuniti, Palermo. Completed in 1916 as Giove for the Regia Marina. Scuttled on 8 April 1941 at Massowah, Italian Somaliland. Salvaged on 20 June and later repaired. To MoWT in 1942 and renamed Empire Trophy. Arrived on 2 September 1944 at Bombay with boiler defects and laid up. Beached in March 1947 and stripped of useful materials before scrapping in Bombay.

=== Empire Trotwood ===
Empire Trotwood was a 797 GRT coastal tanker which was built by Grangemouth Dockyard Ltd, Grangemouth. Launched on 29 February 1944 and completed in May 1944. Sold in 1947 to Kuwait Oil Co Ltd and renamed Amir. Operated under the management of Anglo-Iranian Oil Co Ltd. Sold in 1952 to Shell-Mex & BP Ltd and renamed BP Distributor. Scrapped in May 1965 at Willebroek, Belgium.

=== Empire Trumpet ===
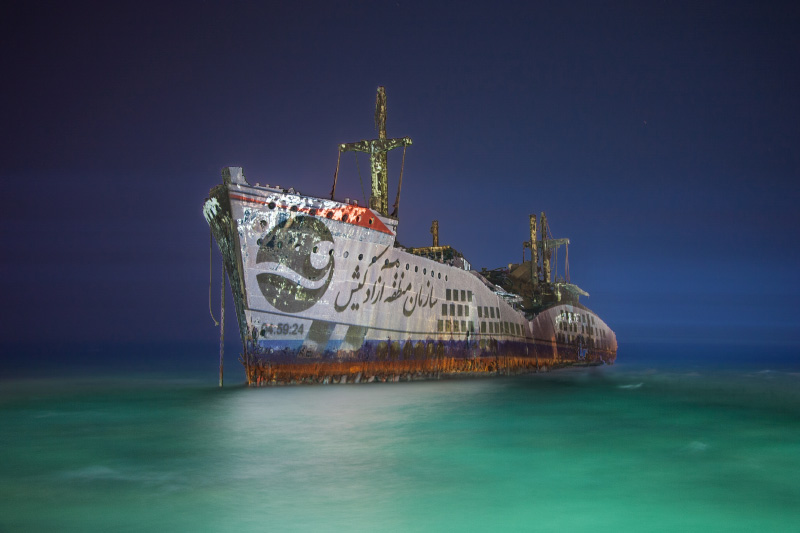
Khoula F

Empire Trumpet was a 7,059 GRT cargo ship which was built by William Hamilton & Co Ltd, Port Glasgow. Launched on 9 March 1943 and completed in April 1943. Sold in 1946 to T & J Harrison Ltd and renamed Naturalist. Sold in 1959 to Iranian Lloyd Co Ltd, Iran and renamed Persian Cyrus. Sold in 1965 to Iranian Shipping Lines SA and renamed Hamadan. Sold in 1966 to P J Frangoulis & A I Cliafas, Greece and renamed Koula F. She ran aground on 25 July 1966 on the coast of Qais Island, Iran and declared a total loss. The wreck is mostly out of the water and a popular tourist sight.

=== Empire Trust ===
Empire Trust was an 8,143 GRT cargo ship which was built by Barclay, Curle & Co Ltd, Glasgow. Launched on 15 November 1940 and completed in February 1941. To the Dutch Government in 1942 and renamed Rembrandt. Sold in 1947 to Vereenigde Nederlandsche Scheepsvaart Maatschappij, The Hague and renamed Amerskerk. Renamed Rijnkerk later that year. Arrived on 21 September 1963 at Hong Kong for scrapping.

=== Empire Tudor ===
Empire Tudor was a 7,087 GRT cargo ship which was built by Shipbuilding Corporation Ltd, Sunderland. Launched on 23 May 1944 and completed in July 1944. Sold in 1948 to Goulandris Bros, London and renamed Grandyke. Sold in 1949 to Ben Line Steamers Ltd and renamed Benvannoch. Sold in 1956 to Helmville Ltd and renamed Medina Princess. Operated under the management of M Alachouzos, London. She ran aground on 3 August 1962 near Djibouti and laid up there. On 1 September 1964, she broke her mooring and ran aground again. Sold in 1967 to Greek shipbreakers.

=== Empire Tugela ===
Empire Tugela was a 6,181 GRT cargo ship which was built by Joh. C. Tecklenborg AG, Wesermünde. Completed in 1921 as Wartenfels for DDG Hansa, Bremen. When war broke out she was in the Red Sea and sought refuge at a port in Italian East Africa and then Madagascar. Seized on 4 May 1942 at Diego Suarez, damaged but most of the scuttling charges failed to detonate. Salvaged by Royal Navy, to MoWT and renamed Empire Tugela. Sold in 1947 to Oceanic Navigation Co, Calcutta and renamed Chitpur. Sold in 1948 to Hwah Sung Steamship Co, Shanghai and renamed Hwah Sung. Sold in 1950 to Wallem & Co, Panama and renamed Navidad. Sold in 1952 to Purple Star Shipping Co, China. Sold in 1953 to Hwah Sung Steamship Co, Shanghai and renamed Hwah Sung. Deleted from shipping registers in 1960. Reported sighting in 1983 as Zhan Dou 75, owned by the Chinese Government but this ship was previously Shen Li (ex-Empire Nile). Possible identity in 1983 was Zhan Dou 46 although not listed in any shipping registers.

=== Empire Tulip ===
Empire Tulip was a 288 GRT coaster which was built by Scheepsvaart Delfzijl v/h Sander, Delfzijl, Netherlands. Completed in 1939 as Pallas for N Engelsman, Delfzijl. Requisitioned in 1940, to MoWT and renamed Empire Tulip. Sold in 1947 to E J & W Goldsmith Ltd, London and renamed Goldgnome. Sold in 1954 to London & Rochester Trading Co Ltd and renamed Insistence. New diesel engine fitted in 1954 and another in 1964. Scrapped in December 1970 at Rochester, Kent.

=== Empire Turnstone ===
Empire Turnstone was a 5,828 GRT cargo ship which was being built by Columbia River Shipbuilding, Portland, Oregon for the Shipping Controller as War Arrow. Requisitioned by the United States Shipping Board and completed after in June 1918 as Western City for USSB. To MoWT in 1941 and renamed Empire Turnstone. Torpedoed on 23 October 1942 and sunk by U-621 at 54°40′N 28°00′W while a straggler from Convoy ONS 136.

=== Empire Tweed ===
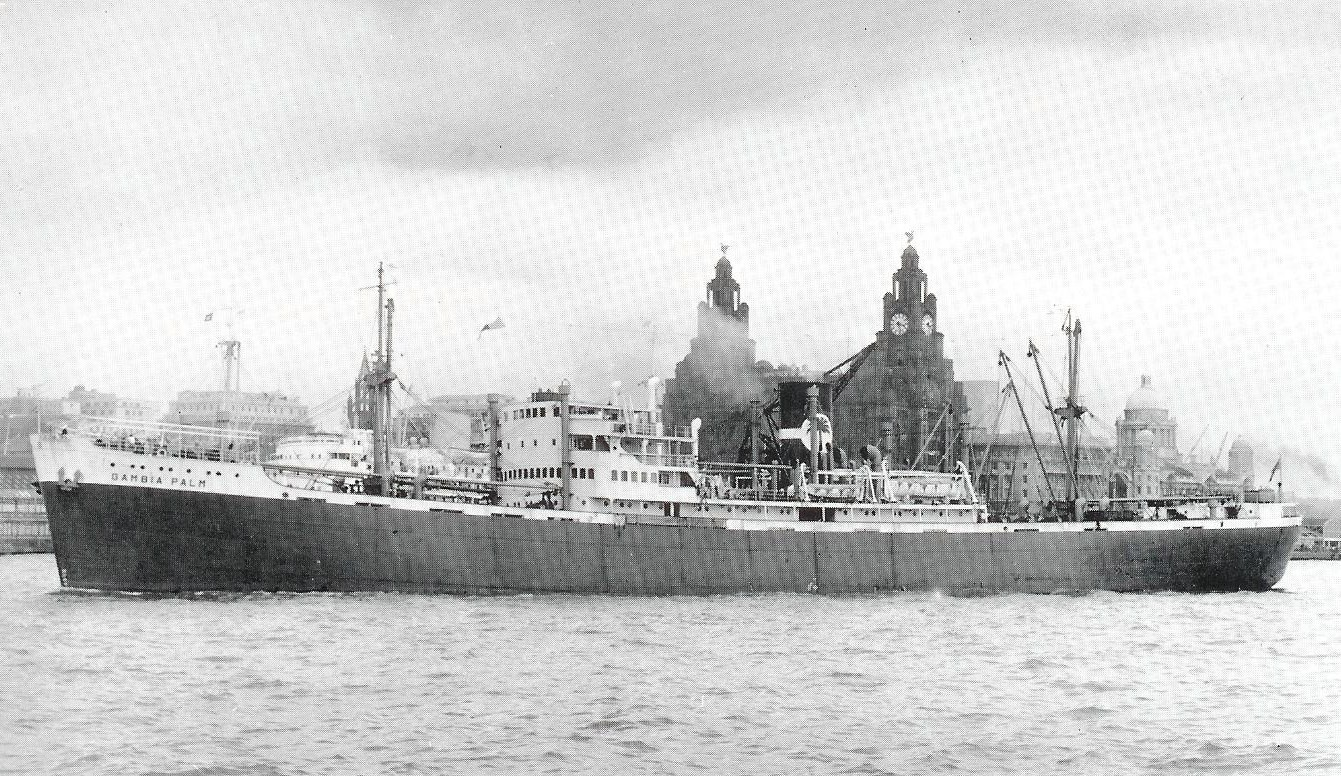
Gambian Palm

Empire Tweed was a 5,452 GRT cargo ship which was built by Deutsche Schiff- und Maschinenbau AG, Wesermünde. Completed in 1937 as Gambian for United Africa Co Ltd. Seized in 1941 by Vichy French forces at Dakar, Senegal. Renamed St Gabriel under the Vichy flag. Returned to Britain in 1943, renamed Gambian, then to MoWT and renamed Empire Tweed. Returned to United Africa Co Ltd in 1946 and renamed Gambian. Sold in 1949 to Palm Line Ltd and renamed Gambian Palm. Sold in 1959 to E N Vernicos Shipping Co, Greece and renamed Irini's Blessing. Scrapped in July 1963 in Hong Kong.

=== Empire Tyne ===
Empire Tyne was a 3,724 GRT cargo ship which was built by Tyne Iron Shipbuilding Co Ltd, Newcastle upon Tyne. Completed in 1923 as Steelville. Sold in 1937 to F C Dawson & Co Ltd and renamed Francis Dawson. Caught fire on 8 March 1941 at Bedford Basin, Halifax, Nova Scotia and extensively damaged. Declared a constructive total loss. Towed to New York and repaired, to MoWT in 1941 and renamed Empire Tyne. Sold in 1947 to Williamson & Co, Hong Kong and renamed Inchcrag. Scrapped in Hong Kong in 1952.

== See also ==
The above entries give a precis of each ship's history. For a fuller account see the linked articles.

== Sources ==
- Mitchell, W H; Sawyer, L A (1990). The Empire Ships (Second ed.). London, New York, Hamburg, Hong Kong: Lloyd's of London Press Ltd. ISBN 1-85044-275-4.
