= List of Empire ships (T) =

There were 121 Empire ships that had a suffix beginning with T. They can be found at

- List of Empire ships - Ta to Te
- List of Empire ships - Th to Ty
