= USS J. Franklin Bell =

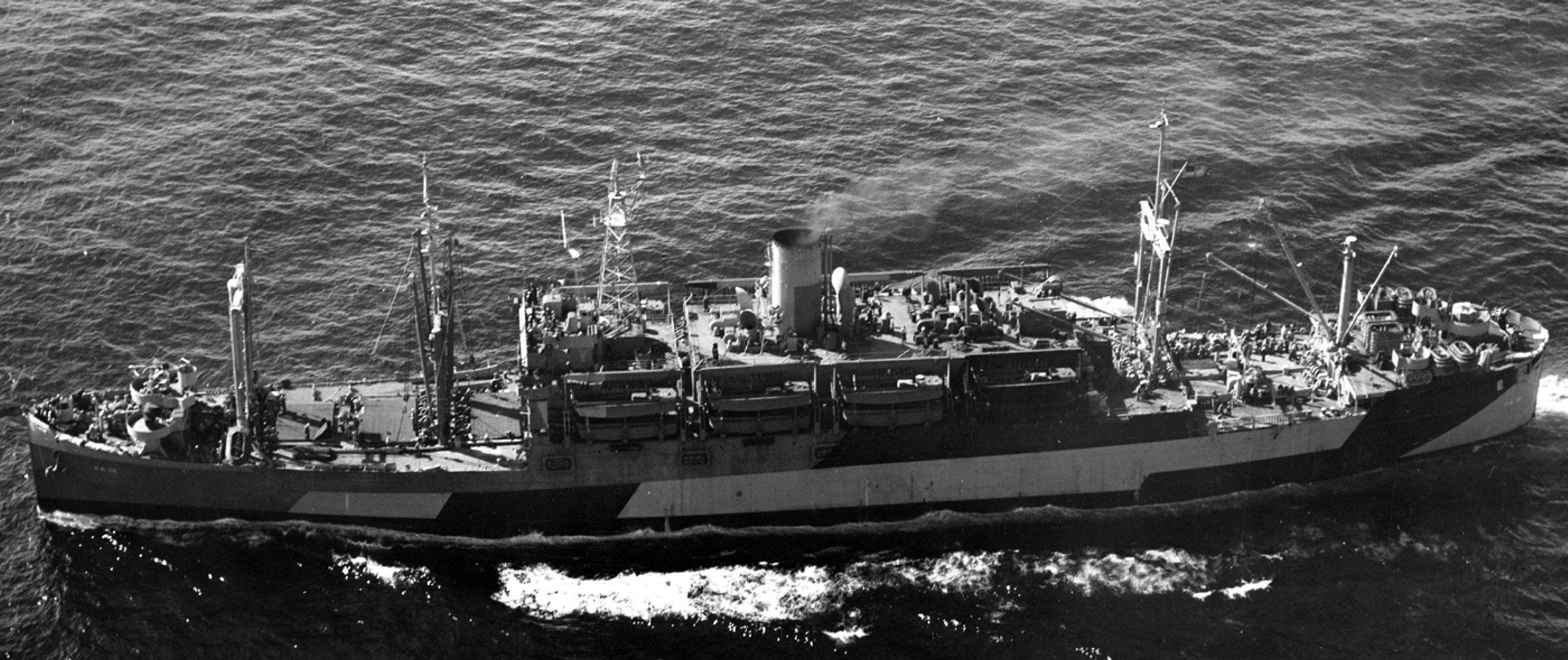
- J. Franklin Bell on 28 April 1944

History

United States
- Name: SS Keystone State (1920–1922); SS President McKinley (1922–1940); USS J. Franklin Bell (1940–1942)
- Namesake: Pennsylvania (1921–22); William McKinley (1922–1940); J. Franklin Bell (1940–1942)
- Builder: New York Shipbuilding Corporation, Camden, New Jersey
- Laid down: 1918
- Launched: 15 May 1920
- Completed: 1 March 1921
- Acquired: for the US Army, 26 October 1940; for the US Navy, 26 December 1941
- Commissioned: as AP-34, 2 April 1942
- Decommissioned: 20 March 1946
- Maiden voyage: 6 August 1921
- Renamed: President McKinley (9 June 1922); J. Franklin Bell (26 October 1940)
- Reclassified: AP-34 to APA-16, 1 February 1943
- Identification: as President McKinley: official number 921314; signal code KDSL
- Honours and awards: 6 battle stars for World War II service
- Fate: Sold for scrap, 3 April 1948

General characteristics
- Class & type: Harris-class attack transport
- Tonnage: 14,127 GRT; tonnage under deck 7,050; 8,400 NRT
- Displacement: 13,529 tons (lt), 21,900 t.(fl)
- Length: 516.5 feet (157.4 m) p/p; 535 feet 2 inches (163.12 m) o/a
- Beam: 72.2 feet (22.0 m)
- Draft: 31 feet 6 inches (9.60 m)
- Depth: 27.8 feet (8.5 m)
- Installed power: 12,000 shp
- Propulsion: 8 × header-type boilers, 4 × steam turbines, 2 × screws
- Speed: 17 kn (20 mph; 31 km/h)
- Capacity: troops: 103 officers, 1,740 enlisted; Cargo: 200,000 cubic feet (5,700 m^{3}); 2,300 tons
- Complement: officers 46, enlisted 637
- Sensors & processing systems: direction finding equipment; gyrocompass
- Armament: * 4 × 3"/50 caliber dual-purpose gun mounts; 2 × twin 40mm gun mounts; 16 × single 20mm gun mounts

USS J. Franklin Bell (APA-16) was a Harris-class attack transport ship. She was built in 1921 and spent 20 years in merchant service as a passenger and cargo liner. She was acquired for the United States Army in 1940 and transferred to the United States Navy shortly after the USA entered the Second World War. She served throughout and after the Pacific War, was decommissioned in 1946 and scrapped in 1948.

== Building ==
The vessel was designed to be an army transport, ordered by the USSB from New York Shipbuilding Corporation, Camden, New Jersey and laid down in 1918. Keystone State was launched on 15 May 1920 sponsored by the wife of the company's president, Mrs. Marvin A. Neeland. The ship was delivered 28 May 1921 and completed on 1 March 1921.

Keystone State was a turbine steamship, with eight Babcock & Wilcox header-type boilers supplying steam to four Bethlehem Steel Curtis type steam turbines. Her four turbines drove twin propeller shafts by single reduction gearing. Her engines developed 12,000 shaft horsepower and gave her a speed of 17 kn (20 mph; 31 km/h) – as fast as many ocean liners of her time.

== Civilian service ==
She was delivered May 28 1921. Pacific Mail Steamship Company operated her as a passenger and cargo ship from 28 May 1921. On 6 August she started her maiden voyage, which was from Seattle to the Far East.

In 1922 she was renamed President McKinley on 9 June and transferred to Admiral Oriental Lines on 21 December. She was transferred to American Mail Line in 1926 and laid up in Seattle in 1938.

=== SS President Hoover ===
Early on the morning of 11 December 1937 a Dollar Steamship Company ocean liner, President Hoover, ran aground in a typhoon on Kasho-to, east of Formosa. Hoover's 330 crew got their 503 passengers and themselves safely ashore without loss, but the 853 people now needed to be taken off the remote island. The task was shared between President McKinley and Dollar Line's SS President Pierce. McKinley, assisted by the Japanese cruiser Ashigara, collected about 630 people from Kasho-to on 14 December. Pierce collected the remaining 200 people on 15 December.

== War service ==
The United States Army acquired her on 26 October 1940 and had her converted into a military transport. She was renamed J. Franklin Bell after General J. Franklin Bell, US Army Chief of Staff 1906–10. She was transferred to the United States Navy on 26 December 1941; and commissioned in ordinary before commissioning in full at San Francisco on 2 April 1942 under the command of Captain H.J. Grassie.

After shakedown, a round-trip voyage to Pearl Harbor, and more than 2 months of amphibious training along the California coast, J. Franklin Bell left San Francisco 13 August and headed via Kodiak, Alaska to Adak. She carried some 1,500 troops and a full load of cargo to strengthen American defenses in the Aleutian Islands, then threatened with invasion.

=== Aleutian landings ===
On returning San Diego 29 September, J. Franklin Bell resumed coastal operations and amphibious training in preparation for taking the offensive in the Aleutians by recapturing Attu Island. Reclassified APA-16 February 1, 1943, she continued rehearsals until sailing to San Francisco 16 April to embark troops and their equipment. She sailed on 24 April for Cold Bay, Alaska. Though hampered by heavy seas, her task force arrived off Attu 11 May in a dense fog. J. Franklin Bell, now under Comdr. J.B. McGovern, began landing operations. Submerged rocks, pea soup weather, and narrow, rocky beaches permitted only two or three boats to be unloaded at a time. Two days later she started unloading around the clock, enabling her to finish the task, embark casualties, and head for home by 16 May.

After training throughout June, she embarked some 1,750 soldiers and, after 2 weeks of landing rehearsals, left San Diego on 29 July for Adak. At the end of a week of weather and terrain conditioning there, she steamed for Kiska 13 August. Her landing boats went ashore through rough surf and found the enemy had withdrawn. She completed unloading operations in 2 days, embarked 600 troops and sailed for San Francisco on the 20th.

At San Francisco she discharged the troops and embarked naval passengers for Wellington, New Zealand, where she arrived 30 September. In the following month of amphibious assault training, Captain O.H. Ritchie took command 22 October. After embarking 1,800 marines she sailed on 1 November for final landing rehearsals before departing 13 November to invade Tarawa.

=== Invasion of Tarawa ===
The first step in a major amphibious offensive through Micronesia was the conquest of the Gilbert Islands. During midwatch on 20 November, J. Franklin Bell took her assigned position off Betio, the most heavily defended Japanese garrison on Tarawa Atoll. Heavy bombardment by the US Navy began at 0515 hrs, and the enemy responded with scattered fire at the transports.

Straddled by gunfire, J. Franklin Bell retired out of range and, while the battle continued ashore, awaited orders to land her troops. The next day she sailed to Bairiki and landed her Marines. Finding only dead enemies, they boarded landing boats and moved from island to island along the atoll. Meanwhile, after the Bairiki landings, J. Franklin Bell began sending cargo ashore. The Marines secured Betio on the 23rd and the entire atoll on 27 November, and J. Franklin Bell departed with Marines embarked for Pearl Harbor.

=== Invasion of Kwajalein ===
After a month of training in Hawaii, the transport embarked more than 1,500 soldiers and sailed for Kwajalein Atoll. When she arrived on 31 January, fire support ships were bombarding enemy shore installations in preparation for landings the next day. J. Franklin Bell entered the lagoon 2 February to unload supplies and receive casualties. On the 5th her landing boats assaulted Gugegwe, and two days later the atoll was secured. The transport departed on 8 February carrying more than 2,000 soldiers, and reached Pearl Harbor on the 15th.

=== Invasion of Saipan ===
J. Franklin Bell then made two round trips to the US mainland before embarking soldiers and sailing for the Mariana Islands. She arrived off Saipan 16 June, the day after the first landings; and debarked her troops on the 17th. After unloading supplies she retired some 100 nautical miles (190 km) northeast of Saipan to await the outcome of the Battle of the Philippine Sea 19–21 June. When the battle was won she returned to Saipan on 25 June, completed unloading and embarked casualties. She then sailed to Eniwetok, loaded more cargo and headed via Saipan to embark Marines for the assault on nearby Tinian.

=== Invasion of Tinian ===
Departing on 24 July, J. Franklin Bell joined in a diversionary operation at the southern end of Tinian. Under cover of a fierce bombardment, the transport feigned two landings to divert enemy attention while the real landings were made at the northern end of the island. After this successful subterfuge she sailed to the actual beachheads and landed her troops. She embarked casualties the next afternoon and returned to Saipan on the 27th. She left the next day carrying 438 Japanese prisoners, and arrived at Pearl Harbor on 10 August.

=== Invasion of Leyte ===
J. Franklin Bell returned to the Western Pacific, putting into Manus, Admiralty Islands on 3 October to embark 1,600 assault troops for the invasion of the Philippines. She headed for Leyte Gulf on 14 October and arrived off Dulag, Leyte on 20 October. After quickly debarking her troops she began unloading supplies and receiving casualties. Defying repeated air attacks, she unloaded supplies into LCTs all day and night, completing the task shortly after noon the next day. Then she left with the Royal Navy Admiral of the Fleet Sir Roger Keyes aboard, arriving in Manus on the 27th.

=== Invasion of Okinawa ===
After a voyage to New Guinea, J. Franklin Bell left Manus for San Francisco and arrived 27 November. She left again on 28 February 1945, reaching at Nouméa, New Caledonia on 18 April. After landing exercises and embarking Seabees and their equipment, she headed for Okinawa via Eniwetok and Ulithi. She dropped anchor at Hagushi, 17 June to debark her Seabees. Subjected to frequent air alerts, she completed her unloading under cover of a smoke screen late the following afternoon.

She departed on the 22nd, carrying 862 casualties to Saipan before proceeding to Espiritu Santo and Nouméa to embark homebound casualties. She left Nouméa on 11 July with more than 1,700 passengers and reached San Francisco on the 27th.

=== After hostilities ===
On 2 September Japan surrendered, and on 21 September J. Franklin Bell sailed for the Western Pacific, carrying troops to Eniwetok, Okinawa, and Leyte. After boarding homebound passengers at Leyte, she sailed on 27 October and reached Seattle on 12 November. She began coastal operations on the 22nd, shuttling between Washington and California ports.

=== Decommission ===
J. Franklin Bell arrived at Suisun Bay, California, 20 March 1946 and was decommissioned the same day. She was transferred to the War Shipping Administration for disposal, and sold for scrap on 3 April 1948 to Boston Metals of Baltimore, Maryland.

=== Awards ===
J. Franklin Bell received six battle stars for World War II service.
