= USS Hugh L. Scott =

US Passenger and Cargo Liner & Naval troopship

Coordinates: 33°40′N 7°35′W

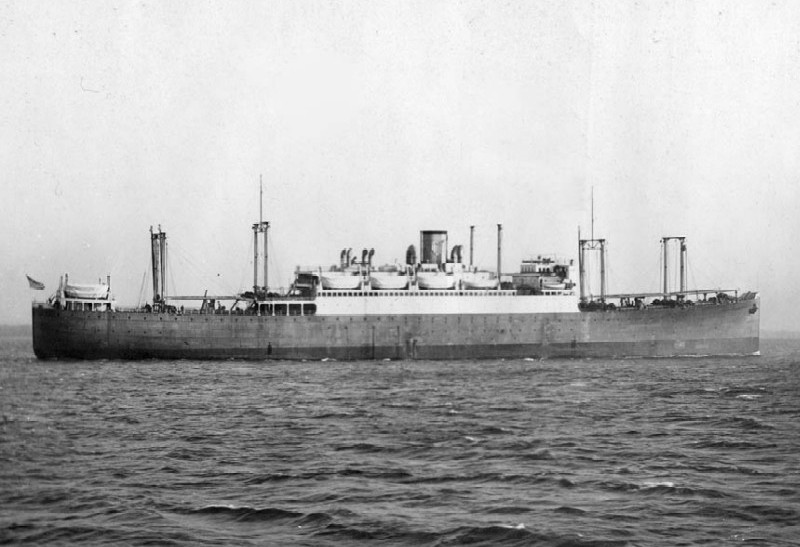
- Hawkeye State in the 1920s, which became USS Hugh L. Scott in 1941

History

United States
- Name: SS Hawkeye State (1921–25); SS President Pierce (1925–41); USAT Hugh L. Scott (1941–42); USS Hugh L. Scott (1942)
- Namesake: Iowa (1921–25); Franklin Pierce (1925–41); Hugh L. Scott (1941–42)
- Operator: Matson Line (1921–22); Pacific Mail Steamship Company (1922–25); Dollar Steamship Co (1925–38); American President Lines (1938–41); United States Army (1941–42); United States Navy (1942)
- Builder: Bethlehem Shipbuilding Corporation
- Cost: $6,664,521.20
- Yard number: 4180
- Launched: 17 April 1920
- Completed: 1921
- Acquired: for the US Army, 31 July 1941
- Commissioned: into the US Navy, 7 September 1942
- Out of service: 12 November 1942
- Stricken: 7 December 1942
- Identification: U.S. official number 220987; as President Pierce: signal code KDNV
- Fate: Sunk 12 November 1942

General characteristics
- Type: Design 1029 ship known commercially as "535" Type
- Tonnage: 12,546 GRT; 6,663 NRT
- Length: 517 ft (158 m) p/p; 532 ft (162 m) o/a
- Beam: 72.2 ft (22.0 m)
- Draft: 30 ft 6 in (9.30 m)
- Depth: 27.8 ft (8.5 m)
- Propulsion: 4 steam turbines, twin screws
- Speed: 18 kn (21 mph; 33 km/h)
- Sensors & processing systems: direction finding equipment; gyrocompass

USS Hugh L. Scott (AP-43) was a Hugh L. Scott-class transport ship. She was built in 1921 and spent 20 years in merchant service as a passenger and cargo liner. In July 1941 the ship was delivered to the United States Department of War for Army service as the United States Army Transport Hugh L. Scott operating in the Pacific. In August 1942 the ship was transferred to the United States Navy for conversion to an attack transport, served as a troopship in Operation Torch in November 1942, and was sunk by a U-boat four days later. 59 crewmen and soldiers died during the sinking.

== Construction ==
The vessel was designed to be a troopship, ordered by the United States Shipping Board (USSB) from Bethlehem Shipbuilding Corporation, Sparrows Point, Maryland, and laid down in 1920 as Berrien. Renamed Hawkeye State, the ship was launched on 17 April 1921 and given the United States official number 220987. The ship, hull number 4180 and the first of a series, was an Emergency Fleet Corporation (EFC) Design 1029 and one of eight contracted ships of the design for Bethlehem Shipbuilding of which five were built after cancellations. The Design 1029 ships were first known, along with the slightly smaller Design 1095 or "502s" built only by New York Shipbuilding Corporation, as the "State" ships, as all were given state nicknames until all but four were renamed by May 1922 for United States presidents. In later commercial service they were frequently known as the "535s" for their length overall.

Hawkeye State was a turbine steamship, with four steam turbines driving twin propeller shafts by single reduction gearing giving a service speed of 17.5 knots (32.4 km/h).

== Service history ==
=== Civilian service ===
On 5 March 1921 Hawkeye State, the largest combined passenger and cargo vessel of the USSB ever to put into a Pacific port, arrived in San Francisco to begin Matson Line service. Matson operated Hawkeye State between Baltimore and Honolulu via the Panama Canal and California. In 1922, she passed to the Pacific Mail Steamship Company, which was taken over by Robert Dollar in 1925. She was then transferred to Dollar Steamship Company, which renamed her President Pierce. In 1938, Dollar was reorganised as American President Lines.

=== Routes with Dollar Lines ===
Dollar Line put President Pierce on trans-Pacific services between San Francisco and the Far East until 1931, when she was switched to a round-the-world service. Her first circumnavigation began at New York on 19 November 1931, going via the Panama Canal, California, Japan, China, Malaya, Ceylon, the Suez Canal, the Mediterranean and thence back to New York. She completed a total of five such trips, beginning her final one from New York on 2 June 1933.

=== SS President Hoover ===
Early on the morning of 11 December 1937, a much larger Dollar Lines ship, the ocean liner President Hoover, ran aground in a typhoon on Kasho-to, east of Formosa. Hoover's 330 crew got their 503 passengers and themselves safely ashore without loss, but the 853 people now needed to be taken off the remote island. The task was shared between President Pierce and American Mail Line's SS President McKinley. McKinley, assisted by the Japanese cruiser Ashigara, collected about 630 people from Kasho-to on 14 December. Pierce collected the remaining 200 people on 15 December.

=== War service ===
On 31 July 1941, President Pierce was delivered by American President Lines to the War Department at San Francisco for operation by the US Army, which renamed her USAT Hugh L. Scott after General Hugh L. Scott, who was Army Chief of Staff 1914–17 and interim Secretary of War February—March 1916. The ship made one round trip to Honolulu before voyaging to Manila and redelivered to American President Lines for a special State Department mission to Hong Kong and Shanghai. In late October she returned to San Francisco by way of Manila to make one more round trip to Manila returning to San Francisco 25 December 1941. The ship made two trips to Australia in early 1942 and was then ordered to the US East Coast arriving at New York in July 1942.

On 30 April 1942, the 32nd Infantry Division boarded a convoy of seven Matson Line ships, including Hugh L. Scott and the S.S. Lurline at Pier 42 in San Francisco. The convoy (SF 43) was escorted by the cruiser USS Indianapolis and two corvettes. Taking a southerly route to avoid the Japanese Navy, they arrived in southern Australia at Port Adelaide on 14 May 1942, having traveled 9,000 miles (14,000 km) in 23 days.

On 14 August 1942, she was transferred to the US Navy and converted into an attack transport by Tietjen and Long of Hoboken, New Jersey. On 7 September 1942, she was commissioned as USS Hugh L. Scott, under the command of Captain Harold J. Wright.

Hugh L. Scott took part in Operation Torch, the Allied invasion of French North Africa. As part of Transport Division 3 (TransDiv 3), she sailed on 24 October after intensive amphibious training. She approached the beaches at Fedhala, French Morocco, early on the morning of 8 November and landed her troops. She then cleared the immediate invasion area and did not return until 11 November, when she entered the refueling area and then anchored in the exposed Fedhala roadstead to unload her supplies.

=== Sunk by U-boat ===
The Naval Battle of Casablanca delayed the off-loading of Hugh L. Scott's cargo and her departure from the Moroccan coast. On the evening of 11 November, U-173 slipped inside the protective screen and torpedoed transport Joseph Hewes, tanker Winooski and destroyer Hambleton. Hugh L. Scott and the other transports were at battle stations all night and resumed unloading the next day. That afternoon, 12 November, another submarine, U-130, commanded by Ernst Kals, torpedoed Hugh L. Scott, Edward Rutledge, and Tasker H. Bliss.

Hugh L. Scott, hit on the starboard side, burst into flames and foundered, but owing to the availability of landing craft for rescue, casualties were limited to eight officers and 51 men. U-173 was later sunk by destroyers, but U-130 escaped.
