= SS Francis E. Powell =

American oil tanker (1922–1942)

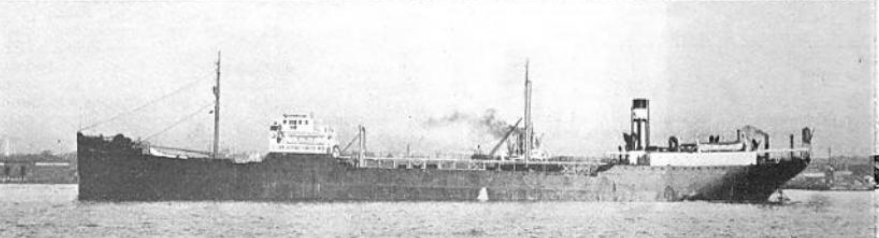
- Francis E. Powell in November 1923

History

United States
- Name: Macy Willis (1922–1923); Francis E. Powell (1923–1942)
- Namesake: J. Macy Willis, manager of the Baltimore Dry Dock plant of the Bethlehem Shipbuilding Corporation; Francis E. Powell, chairman of the Anglo-American Oil Company
- Owner: Bethlehem Steel (1922–1923); Atlantic Refining Company (1923–1942)
- Ordered: January 1, 1920
- Builder: United States Shipping Board (1920–1921); Bethlehem Shipbuilding Corporation (1921–1922)
- Yard number: 119 (under USSB); 216 (under Bethlehem)
- Laid down: September 27, 1920
- Launched: November 22, 1921
- Sponsored by: Mrs. Willis
- Completed: June 1922
- In service: 1922–1942
- Home port: Philadelphia
- Identification: US official number: 221868; Maritime call sign: KFIG
- Fate: Sunk off Virginia on January 27, 1942

General characteristics
- Type: Oil tanker
- Tonnage: 7,507 GRT; 4,325 NRT
- Length: 430 ft (130 m)
- Beam: 59 ft (18 m)
- Draft: 33.3 ft (10.1 m) (mean)
- Installed power: 2x steam turbines
- Propulsion: 1 screw
- Speed: 11 knots (20 km/h; 13 mph)
- Capacity: 81,000 barrels (liquid cargo capacity); 9,074 barrels (bunker capacity)

SS Francis E. Powell was an American oil tanker that was built from 1920–1922 by the Bethlehem Shipbuilding Corporation, after the end of the original contract for the vessel with the United States Shipping Board. She was operated by the Atlantic Refining Company after she was purchased in 1923. The tanker was torpedoed and sunk by U-130 on January 27, 1942.

== Construction ==
The tanker, originally named Macy Willis, was ordered on January 1, 1920. Her keel was laid in Sparrows Point, Maryland, on September 27, 1920, as hull number 119. She was launched on November 22, 1921, sponsored by the wife of the tanker's namesake, J. Macy Willis, manager of the Baltimore Dry Dock plant of the Bethlehem Shipbuilding Corporation. During the Macy Willis' construction, the yard she was being built at was acquired by Bethlehem Steel after the end of the United States Shipping Board's contract. Her hull number was changed to 216. The tanker was completed and delivered in June 1922, then put up for sale. She was assigned the official number 221868 and the call sign KFIG.

=== Specifications ===
Macy Willis had a length of 430 feet (130 m), a beam of 59 feet (18 m), and a draft of 33.3 feet (10.1 m). She was powered by two steam turbines geared to one screwshaft. She had a maximum speed of 11 knots (13 mph; 20 km/h). She was 7,507 gross register tons and 4,325 net register tons. She had a liquid cargo capacity of 81,000 barrels and a bunker capacity of 9,074 barrels.

== Service history ==
Macy Willis was purchased in 1923 by the Atlantic Refining Company. She was renamed Francis E. Powell, after the chairman of the Anglo-American Oil Company. The tanker traveled to the United Kingdom loaded with motor spirit on her maiden voyage, though she primarily operated between the East and West Coasts via the Panama Canal. She made frequent stops in Los Angeles before heading through the Canal to reach Philadelphia and New York City. She was registered in Philadelphia.

== Sinking ==
Francis E. Powell departed Port Arthur, Texas, bound for Providence, Rhode Island. She carried 81,000 barrels of furnace oil and gasoline. She was manned by eight officers and 24 crewmen.

On January 27, 1942, Francis E. Powell was sailing completely blacked out at 10.5 knots (12.1 mph; 19.4 km/h). At 9:43 AM, she was struck by the last torpedo of U-130 about 8 miles (13 km) northeast of the Winter Quarter Light Vessel. The torpedo hit the tanker on her port side, aft of the midships house, between the #4 and #5 tanks. The explosion ignited a small fire in the pump room and destroyed the radio antenna.

U-130 was spotted a few hundred yards away from Francis E. Powell. The submarine planned to attack the tanker with its deck gun, though rejected this proposition when other ships were spotted nearby. The tanker's crew abandoned ship in two lifeboats, though her master was crushed when he slipped and fell between a lifeboat and the ship. That boat was lifted back onto the ship by a wave, forcing the occupants to launch a different lifeboat. Another officer and two crewmen died. The tanker caught fire, broke in two, and sank, all around 2:00 PM.

Five hours after the torpedo struck, the 17 men in one lifeboat were rescued by the American tanker W.C. Fairbanks and taken to Lewes, Delaware. The remaining eleven were rescued by a US Coast Guard boat from the Assateague Station and taken to Chincoteague, Virginia.

== Wreck ==
At the end of January, USCGC Dione, a United States Coast Guard Cutter, dropped depth charges on the wreck of Francis E. Powell about 20 miles (32 km) off Oregon Inlet. It was unknown what was struck at first, simply reported as an "underwater object." Two airplanes arrived and dropped bombs on the rapidly spreading patch of oil. They then reported to Dione that they had spotted something long and narrow, making her commander think it was possibly a U-boat. However, an oar and boat hook eventually floated to the surface, revealing it to be the wreck of Francis E. Powell.
