= SS Empire Tower =

World War II merchant ship of the United Kingdom

Coordinates: 43.50°N 14.46°W

History

United Kingdom
- Name: Roxburgh
- Namesake: Roxburgh, Scotland
- Owner: B.J. Sutherland & Co.
- Port of registry: (United Kingdom) Newcastle-upon-Tyne
- Builder: Burntisland Shipbuilding Company Ltd, Fife, Scotland
- Launched: March 1935
- Identification: UK official number 161579; Call sign GYFP
- Fate: Sold 1937

History
- Name: Tower Field
- Owner: Tower Steamship Co.
- Operator: Counties Ship Management, London
- Port of registry: (United Kingdom) London
- Out of service: 19 October 1941
- Identification: UK official number 161579; Call sign GYFP
- Fate: Ran aground & broke in two
- Name: Empire Tower
- Owner: Ministry of War Transport
- Operator: Counties Ship Management, London
- Port of registry: (United Kingdom) London
- In service: December 1942
- Out of service: 5 March 1943
- Identification: UK official number 161579
- Fate: Torpedoed and sunk, 5 March 1943

General characteristics
- Type: Cargo ship
- Tonnage: 4,378 GRT; tonnage under deck 3,927; 2,636 NRT
- Length: 372.0 ft (113.4 m)
- Beam: 52.4 ft (16.0 m)
- Draught: 24 ft 5 in (7.44 m)
- Depth: 25.2 ft (7.7 m)
- Installed power: 335 NHP
- Propulsion: triple expansion steam engine; single screw
- Crew: 39 plus 6 DEMS gunners

SS Empire Tower was a British 4,378 GRT cargo ship built in 1935 and sunk by enemy action in 1943.

She was built by the Burntisland Shipbuilding Company Ltd. in Fife, Scotland. The North Eastern Marine Engineering Co. Ltd. of Sunderland built her 335 nominal horsepower three-cylinder triple expansion steam engine. She had six corrugated furnaces with a combined heating surface of 117 square feet (11 m^{2}) heat to heat her three 180 pounds per square inch (1,200 kPa) single-ended boilers, which had a combined heating surface of 5,445 square feet (506 m^{2}). She was fitted with direction finding equipment.

She was launched as SS Roxburgh for B.J. Sutherland and Company of Newcastle-upon-Tyne. In 1937 the Tower Hill Steamship Company, an offshoot of Counties Ship Management, bought her and renamed her SS Tower Field.

== Damage and repair ==
On 10 May 1941 Tower Field was steaming in ballast from London to Newcastle when a German aircraft attacked and damaged her off the Outer Dowsing Buoy in the Thames Estuary. She was repaired and returned to service.

On 19 October 1941 she was entering Workington Channel off Hull with a cargo of iron ore when she ran aground and fractured her hull. She broke in two but her cargo was discharged and she was refloated and repaired.

The Ministry of War Transport took her over and renamed her SS Empire Tower but kept her under CSM management. She returned to service in December 1942.

Approximate position of Empire Tower's wreck

== Sinking ==
Early in 1943 Empire Tower, under Captain David John Williams OBE, joined Convoy XK-2 from Gibraltar to the UK. On 5 March the German Type IX submarine U-130 attacked the convoy and sank Empire Tower, Fidra, Ger-y-Bryn and Trefusis. Empire Tower sank within a minute and Captain Williams, six gunners and 35 crew were lost. The Royal Navy armed trawler HMS Loch Oskaig rescued three survivors and landed them at Londonderry, Northern Ireland.

One week later, on 12 March, a depth charge attack by US Navy destroyer USS Champlin west of the Azores sank U-130 with the loss of all 53 hands.
