= German submarine U-130 (1941) =

German World War II submarine

Coordinates: 10°00′0″N 35°58′3″W

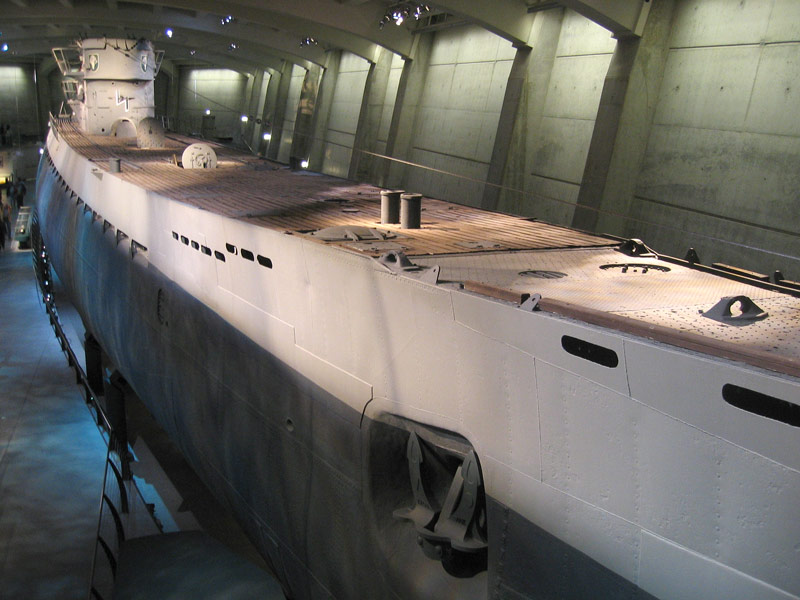
- U-505, a typical Type IXC boat

History

Nazi Germany
- Name: U-130
- Ordered: 7 August 1939
- Builder: DeSchiMAG AG Weser in Bremen
- Yard number: 993
- Laid down: 20 August 1940
- Launched: 14 March 1941
- Commissioned: 11 June 1941
- Fate: Sunk on 12 March 1943

General characteristics
- Class & type: Type IXC submarine
- Displacement: 1,120 t (1,100 long tons) surfaced; 1,232 t (1,213 long tons) submerged
- Length: 76.76 m (251 ft 10 in) o/a; 58.75 m (192 ft 9 in) pressure hull
- Beam: 6.76 m (22 ft 2 in) o/a; 4.40 m (14 ft 5 in) pressure hull
- Height: 9.60 m (31 ft 6 in)
- Draught: 4.70 m (15 ft 5 in)
- Installed power: 4,400 PS (3,200 kW; 4,300 bhp) (diesels); 1,000 PS (740 kW; 990 shp) (electric)
- Propulsion: 2 shafts; 2 × diesel engines; 2 × electric motors
- Speed: 18.3 knots (33.9 km/h; 21.1 mph) surfaced; 7.3 knots (13.5 km/h; 8.4 mph) submerged
- Range: 13,450 nmi (24,910 km; 15,480 mi) at 10 knots (19 km/h; 12 mph) surfaced; 64 nmi (119 km; 74 mi) at 4 knots (7.4 km/h; 4.6 mph) submerged
- Test depth: 230 m (750 ft)
- Complement: 4 officers, 44 enlisted48 to 56
- Armament: 6 × torpedo tubes (4 bow, 2 stern); 22 × 53.3 cm (21 in) torpedoes; 1 × 10.5 cm (4.1 in) SK C/32 deck gun (180 rounds); 1 × 3.7 cm (1.5 in) SK C/30 AA gun; 1 × twin 2 cm FlaK 30 AA guns

Service record
- Part of: 4th U-boat Flotilla; 11 June – 31 August 1941; 2nd U-boat Flotilla; 1 September 1941 – 12 March 1943
- Identification codes: M 41 224
- Commanders: K.Kapt. Ernst Kals; 11 June 1941 – 1 January 1943; Oblt.z.S. Siefried Keller; 7 February – 12 March 1943
- Operations: 6 patrols: 1st patrol: 1 – 16 December 1941; 2nd patrol: 27 December – 25 February 1942; 3rd patrol: 24 March 1942 – 6 June 1942; 4th patrol: 4 July – 12 September 1942; 5th patrol: 29 October – 30 December 1942; 6th patrol: 28 February – 12 March 1943
- Victories: 21 merchant ships sunk (127,608 GRT); 3 auxiliary warships sunk (34,407 GRT); 1 merchant ship damaged (6,986 GRT)

German submarine U-130 was a Type IXC U-boat of Nazi Germany's Kriegsmarine during World War II. She was laid down at the DeSchiMAG AG Weser yard, Bremen as yard number 993 on 20 August 1940, launched on 14 March 1941 and commissioned on 11 June.

Her service life began with training in the 4th U-boat Flotilla; she moved to the 2nd Flotilla for more training on 1 September 1941 and operations with the same organization on 1 December.

She sank 21 ships, a total of 127,608 GRT and three auxiliary warships totalling 34,407 GRT in six patrols. She also damaged one ship of 6,986 GRT. She was a member of three wolfpacks.

== Design ==
German Type IXC submarines were slightly larger than the original Type IXBs. U-131 had a displacement of 1,120 tonnes (1,100 long tons) when at the surface and 1,232 tonnes (1,213 long tons) while submerged. The U-boat had a total length of 76.76 m (251 ft 10 in), a pressure hull length of 58.75 m (192 ft 9 in), a beam of 6.76 m (22 ft 2 in), a height of 9.60 m (31 ft 6 in), and a draught of 4.70 m (15 ft 5 in). The submarine was powered by two MAN M 9 V 40/46 supercharged four-stroke, nine-cylinder diesel engines producing a total of 4,400 metric horsepower (3,240 kW; 4,340 shp) for use while surfaced, two Siemens-Schuckert 2 GU 345/34 double-acting electric motors producing a total of 1,000 metric horsepower (740 kW; 990 shp) for use while submerged. She had two shafts and two 1.92 m (6 ft) propellers. The boat was capable of operating at depths of up to 230 metres (750 ft).

The submarine had a maximum surface speed of 18.3 knots (33.9 km/h; 21.1 mph) and a maximum submerged speed of 7.3 knots (13.5 km/h; 8.4 mph). When submerged, the boat could operate for 63 nautical miles (117 km; 72 mi) at 4 knots (7.4 km/h; 4.6 mph); when surfaced, she could travel 13,450 nautical miles (24,910 km; 15,480 mi) at 10 knots (19 km/h; 12 mph). U-131 was fitted with six 53.3 cm (21 in) torpedo tubes (four fitted at the bow and two at the stern), 22 torpedoes, one 10.5 cm (4.13 in) SK C/32 naval gun, 180 rounds, and a 3.7 cm (1.5 in) SK C/30 as well as a 2 cm (0.79 in) C/30 anti-aircraft gun. The boat had a complement of forty-eight.

== Service history ==
=== First and second patrols ===
The boat's operational debut was her departure from Kiel on 1 December 1941. Crossing the North Sea, she entered the Atlantic Ocean via the gap between the Faroe and the Shetland Islands. She sank Kurdistan northwest of Northern Ireland on the tenth before docking at Lorient in occupied France on the 16th. U-130 would use this port for the rest of her career. The Kurdistan survivors were picked up by HMS Kingcup and landed at Derry.

The submarine was unsuccessfully attacked by an aircraft on 12 January 1942 in the Cabot Strait, between Nova Scotia and Newfoundland on her second patrol. She then sank two ships on the 13th east of Nova Scotia. She was almost sunk by two Canadian destroyers on the 18th, but the winter weather played a part, hampering both sides. The U-boat moved south, to warmer waters.

=== Third, fourth and fifth patrols ===
U-130's third patrol was marked by using her deck gun in conjunction with her torpedoes in the western north Atlantic and the eastern Caribbean when she sank Grenanger on 11 April 1942 and Esso Boston a day later.

The boat's fourth sortie also brought success, this time near the Cape Verde islands. Among others, she sank Tankexpress, Elmwood and Danmark, all in July 1942.

She tried to impede the landings for Operation Torch, the invasion of North Africa, when she sank three troop transports at anchor off Morocco on 12 November 1942. They were USS Tasker H. Bliss, Edward Rutledge and Hugh L. Scott. The boat then headed off into the Atlantic, north of the Azores.

=== Sixth patrol and loss ===
Her last patrol was not without success; she sank Trefusis, Fidra, Empire Tower and Ger-y-Bryn, all on 5 March 1943.

She was sunk on 13 March 1943 by depth charges from the American destroyer USS Hobby in the North Atlantic. 53 men died. There were no survivors.

==== Previously recorded fate ====
U-130 was sunk west of the Azores on 12 March 1943 by depth charges from USS Champlin. This attack was actually against the U-515 causing no damage.

=== Wolfpacks ===
U-130 took part in three wolfpacks, namely:

- Schlagetot (9 – 21 November 1942)
- Westwall (21 November – 16 December 1942)
- Unverzagt (12 March 1943)

== Summary of raiding history ==
Date	Name	Nationality	Tonnage (Note: Merchant ship tonnages are in gross register tons. Military vessels are listed by tons displacement.)	Fate
10 December 1941	Kirnwood	United Kingdom	3,829	Sunk
10 December 1941	Kurdistan	United Kingdom	5,844	Sunk
10 December 1941	Star of Luxor	Egypt	5,298	Sunk
13 January 1942	Friar Rock	Panama	5,427	Sunk
13 January 1942	Frisco	Norway	1,582	Sunk
21 January 1942	Alexander Høegh	Norway	8,248	Sunk
25 January 1942	Varanger	Norway	9,305	Sunk
27 January 1942	Francis E. Powell	United States	7,096	Sunk
27 January 1942	Halo	United States	6,986	Damaged
11 April 1942	Grenanger	Norway	5,393	Sunk
11 April 1942	Esso Boston	United States	7,699	Sunk
25 July 1942	Tankexpress	Norway	10,095	Sunk
27 July 1942	Elmwood	Norway	7,167	Sunk
30 July 1942	Danmark	United Kingdom	8,391	Sunk
9 August 1942	Malmanger	Norway	7,078	Sunk
11 August 1942	Mirlo	Norway	7,455	Sunk
25 August 1942	Viking Star	United Kingdom	6,445	Sunk
26 August 1942	Beechwood	United Kingdom	4,897	Sunk
12 November 1942	USS Edward Rutledge	United States Navy	9,360	Sunk
12 November 1942	USS Hugh L. Scott	United States Navy	12,479	Sunk
12 November 1942	USS Tasker H. Bliss	United States Navy	12,568	Sunk
5 March 1943	Empire Tower	United Kingdom	4,378	Sunk
5 March 1943	Fidra	United Kingdom	1,574	Sunk
5 March 1943	Ger-y-Bryn	United Kingdom	5,108	Sunk
5 March 1943	Trefusis	United Kingdom	5,299	Sunk

== Bibliography ==
- Busch, Rainer; Röll, Hans-Joachim (1999). German U-boat commanders of World War II : a biographical dictionary. Translated by Brooks, Geoffrey. London, Annapolis, Md: Greenhill Books, Naval Institute Press. ISBN 1-55750-186-6.
- Busch, Rainer; Röll, Hans-Joachim (1999). Deutsche U-Boot-Verluste von September 1939 bis Mai 1945 [German U-boat losses from September 1939 to May 1945]. Der U-Boot-Krieg (in German). Vol. IV. Hamburg, Berlin, Bonn: Mittler. ISBN 3-8132-0514-2.
- Gröner, Erich; Jung, Dieter; Maass, Martin (1991). U-boats and Mine Warfare Vessels. German Warships 1815–1945. Vol. 2. Translated by Thomas, Keith; Magowan, Rachel. London: Conway Maritime Press. ISBN 0-85177-593-4.
- Kemp, Paul (1999). U-Boats Destroyed – German Submarine Losses in the World Wars. London: Arms & Armour. ISBN 1-85409-515-3.
