= List of U.S. Navy ships sunk or damaged in action during World War II =

This is a list of U.S. Navy ships sunk or damaged in action during World War II. It also lists United States Coast Guard losses.

== Battleships (BB) ==
USS Utah (AG-16) was hit by two torpedoes dropped from B5N "Kate" bombers at the onset of the attack on Pearl Harbor. She immediately began listing and capsized within ten minutes. Fifty-eight men were lost on Utah during the attack. Attempts to salvage the old ship were abandoned and today her wreck lies in Pearl Harbor as a war memorial.

USS Texas (BB-35) was providing fire support for American troops pushing inland during the Invasion of Normandy on 25 June 1944 when at 12:08 Texas and USS Arkansas (BB-33) came under fire from German coastal defense batteries. The two sides engaged in an artillery duel when at 13:16 Texas was hit by a 240mm shell that struck the ship's conning tower and support column of the navigation bridge wounding eleven men, one of whom later died. The damage was negligible and Texas continued to fire back at the Germans. At 13:37 she scored a revenge hit with a fourteen-inch shell on the battery which had damaged her. Later in the day at 14:47, she was hit again in the bow by another 240mm shell but this time nobody was hurt and the projectile was later disarmed. The shell is on display onboard the ship today after its donation by the German Army in 1944.

USS Nevada (BB-36) was the only battleship to get underway during the Pearl Harbor attack. She was hit by a torpedo, several 250 kg bombs, and possibly an 800 kg bomb. Afire and taking on a list, she maneuvered and was deliberately beached near Hospital Point to prevent her sinking in deeper waters. Nevada lost sixty men killed and one hundred nine wounded in the attack. She was repaired and overhauled by October 1942. While bombarding Iwo Jima she was hit by a kamikaze which crashed into the main deck near turret number three. Eleven men were killed and forty-nine wounded but damage was minor. After the war Nevada was used as a target ship, first in Operation Crossroads, then sunk by naval gunfire and torpedoes in 1948.

USS Oklahoma (BB-37) was hit by at least five torpedoes during the opening minutes of the attack on Pearl Harbor. She capsized within ten minutes of the first hit and lay upside down in the shallow harbor with hundreds of men trapped inside. Four hundred twenty-nine crewmen died when Oklahoma capsized but thirty-two men were rescued from the overturned ship. The ship was righted, refloated and sunk while under tow to California for scrapping in 1947.

USS Pennsylvania (BB-38) was drydocked in Pearl Harbor on December 7 when the Japanese attack commenced. During the air raid, the ship was struck by a single 250 kg bomb which caused minor damage. She was also set afire from nearby ships sharing the drydock with Pennsylvania. The ship was also targeted by strafing aircraft. Fifteen men were killed and 38 wounded in the attack. On 12 August 1945, just off the coast of Japan, a lone Japanese torpedo bomber penetrated the Allied defense to hit Pennsylvania with its warhead. The torpedo opened a thirty-foot hole in the side of the ship, killed twenty men and wounded ten more. Pennsylvania was the last major US ship damaged in the war. She survived Operation Crossroads with minor damage, to be scuttled in 1948.

USS Arizona (BB-39) was moored in Pearl Harbor on 7 December 1941 when the attack began. The ship was hit by at least two 800 kg (1,800 lb) armor-piercing bombs dropped by B5N "Kate" bombers during the attack. Moments after the bombs struck, Arizona was torn apart by a gigantic magazine explosion that disintegrated most of the forward part of the ship. Arizona sank into the shallow water of the harbor, taking one thousand one hundred seventy-seven of her crew with her. Today she lies where she sank just under the surface of the water. A memorial and shrine to her crew was constructed in 1962.

USS New Mexico (BB-40) was taking part in the pre-invasion shelling of Lingayen Gulf on 6 January 1945. During the bombardment, she came under heavy attack by kamikaze aircraft, one of which hit the bridge, killing her captain, twenty-nine others and wounding eighty-seven. Also killed in this attack was Lieutenant General Herbert Lumsden, the most senior British Army combat fatality of World War II. On 12 May, she was attacked by two kamikazes. One of them plunged into her; the other managed to hit with its bomb. She was set on fire and fifty-four crew were killed, while a further one hundred nineteen were wounded. After the war, New Mexico was sold for scrap in 1947.

USS Mississippi (BB-41) suffered an explosion in her number two turret during bombardment of Makin Island on 20 November 1943 which killed forty-three men. On 9 January 1945 she was struck by a kamikaze while operating in Lingayen Gulf, receiving minor damage, but suffered twenty-six dead and sixty-three wounded. She was hit again off Okinawa by a kamikaze on 5 June 1945 with light damage and one man killed. She was scrapped in 1957 after a lengthy, prestigious career.

USS Idaho (BB-42), on 3 May 1945 off Okinawa, was attacked by two Vals and three Kates at 1452. She shot them all down, but one exploded close off her port quarter. Another crashed close aboard her port quarter and exploded, flooding her blisters. Shrapnel was sent flying over the deck but the ship had taken only minor damage. She was scrapped in 1947.

USS Tennessee (BB-43) received two 800 kg bomb hits during the attack on Pearl Harbor. Both weapons caused minor damage to Tennessee's gun turrets while scattering shrapnel across the ship, killing several men including the captain of the West Virginia. The ship was showered with burning debris, falling iron, and burning oil when USS Arizona exploded just to the aft of the ship. Tennessee suffered four killed and twenty-two wounded in the attack. On 12 April 1945, Tennessee was hit by a low-flying kamikaze on the starboard bow, crashing into the signal bridge. The burning wreck slid aft along the superstructure, crushing antiaircraft guns and their crews, stopping next to Turret Three. Its 250 lb bomb, with what was left of the plane, went through the wooden deck and exploded. twenty-two men were killed or fatally wounded, with another one hundred seven injured. However, damage was slight and Tennessee was back to duty two days later. She was scrapped in 1959 after years in mothball.

USS California (BB-44) was hit by two torpedoes and an 800 kg bomb, leaving her sunk in shallow water during the Pearl Harbor raid. She was raised and underwent major reconstruction to modernize the ship, rejoining the fleet in May 1944. While underway on 23 Aug, USS Tennessee collided with California after a steering malfunction. Seven men died in the accident on California. On 20 November 1944 a pair of Zero kamikazes approached the ship; California's gunners shot one of them down, but the other struck her on the port side abreast of the mainmast. Gasoline from the plane's fuel tanks started a fire and a 5-inch shell from another ship accidentally hit one of California's 5-inch guns, exploded inside the turret, and started another fire. Both fires were out within twelve minutes, but forty-four men were killed and another one hundred fifty five were wounded. The ship was scrapped in 1959.

USS Colorado (BB-45) was damaged by counter battery fire during the bombardment of Tinian on 24 July. Forty-three men were killed, and one hundred ninety eight wounded by twenty two shell hits from Japanese shore batteries; however, she continued shelling the island and providing fire support for the invasion troops. On 27 November 1944 she was hit by two kamikazes. The first crashed into a port side five-inch gun turret and inflicted numerous casualties among personnel in two 40mm mounts. Nineteen were killed and seventy-two wounded. A friendly fire incident on 9 January 1945 accidentally hit her superstructure with gunfire, killing eighteen and wounding fifty-one. Colorado was scrapped in 1959.

USS Maryland (BB-46) suffered light bomb damage and four men killed at Pearl Harbor. She was repaired, refitted at Puget Sound, and rejoined the fleet in 1942. She was torpedoed by a lone G4M during the Battle of Saipan, which killed two men and necessitated repairs at Pearl Harbor. She was damaged on 27 November 1944 by a kamikaze near Leyte Gulf which hit between her Number 1 and Number 2 turrets, killing thirty-one of her men and wounding another thirty. On 7 April 1945, Maryland was struck by a kamikaze again, which landed onto a 20 mm gun mount located on top of turret number 3. She suffered thirty dead and thirty-six wounded. Maryland was repaired and placed in reserve after the war until she was scrapped in 1959.

USS West Virginia (BB-48) was extensively damaged by as many as seven torpedoes, and two 800 kg bombs at Pearl Harbor. The first bomb hit the port side and penetrated the superstructure deck, causing extensive damage to the casemates below. Secondary explosions of the ammunition stored in the casemates caused serious fires there and in the galley deck below them. The second bomb struck the rear superfiring turret roof; it penetrated but failed to explode. She sunk on her keel in shallow water at Pearl Harbor. West Virginia was raised and sent to Puget Sound for major reconstruction. She rejoined the Pacific fleet on 23 September 1944. During the Battle of Okinawa she was hit by a kamikaze "Oscar" that struck her superstructure deck, killing four men and wounding twenty-three, but luckily the plane's bomb was a dud. After the war West Virginia was placed in mothball and scrapped in 1959.

USS North Carolina (BB-55) was torpedoed by Japanese submarine I-19 on 15 September 1942, 150 miles southeast of Guadalcanal, the same spread of torpedoes which also hit and sank USS Wasp. She received emergency repairs at Tonga and proceeded to Pearl Harbor for permanent repairs. On 5 April 1945, while participating in the Okinawa campaign, she was hit by a 5-inch shell in a friendly fire accident during a massive kamikaze attack on the fleet, killing three and wounding forty-four. Today she serves in North Carolina as a battleship memorial museum.

USS Washington (BB-56) took a small caliber shell (probably an 8-inch (203 mm) shell from the heavy cruiser Atago) to her mast during the Naval Battle of Guadalcanal, 15 November 1942. She was damaged when she collided with USS Indiana during refueling maneuvers during the Marshall Islands campaign in 1944. The collision caused extensive damage to her bow. Repairs were made at Pearl Harbor. USS Washington never had a fatality on board nor damage taken from enemy action. She was scrapped in 1961.

USS South Dakota (BB-57) was grounded on an uncharted coral reef near Tonga while initially deploying to the South Pacific on 6 September 1942. After receiving temporary patches at Tonga, she steamed to Pearl Harbor for permanent repairs. During her participation in the Battle of Santa Cruz Islands, she was hit by one bomb during a dive bomber attack from the aircraft carrier Junyō which landed on the roof of the main turret. Two men were killed and over fifty were wounded by fragments from the bomb. On 30 October 1942, while maneuvering to avoid a submarine contact, South Dakota collided with the destroyer Mahan, receiving significant damage that needed repairs in Nouméa.

During Second Naval Battle of Guadalcanal, the ship lost power right as combat was initiated with a Japanese surface task force. South Dakota was illuminated by burning ships and fired upon by the Japanese task force, including battleship Kirishima. It is estimated she was hit by three 14", two 5", six 6", and eighteen 8" caliber shells. Most of the enemy shells were aimed at the ship's superstructure, thus not threatening the ship's survival. Forty men were killed and one hundred eighty wounded from this action. The ship returned to the states for repairs shortly afterward.

During the Battle of the Philippine Sea, a D4Y dive bomber from the aircraft carrier Shōkaku hit South Dakota with a 500 lb bomb, disabling a 40 mm mount, killing twenty-four and wounding another seventy-seven men. After receiving repairs at Puget Sound, she rejoined the fleet. During the Okinawa campaign in 1945, she suffered her final wartime damage from an explosion that occurred while loading ammunition which killed three men. She was scrapped in 1962.

USS Missouri (BB-63): On 11 April 1945, a low-flying kamikaze Zero, although fired upon, crashed on Missouri's starboard side, just below her main deck level. The starboard wing of the plane was thrown far forward, starting a gasoline fire at five-inch Gun Mount No. 3. The battleship suffered only superficial damage, and the fire was brought quickly under control. The remains of the pilot were recovered on board the ship just aft of one of the 40 mm gun tubs. The dent made by the Zero in the Missouri's side remains to this day. Missouri was the only Iowa-class ship that was damaged in the war. Today Missouri is a museum ship in Pearl Harbor, watching over the sunken USS Arizona.

== Aircraft carriers (CV) ==
=== Fleet carriers ===
USS Lexington (CV-2) was hit by two armor-piercing bombs and two torpedoes on 8 May 1942 during the Battle of Coral Sea. After several hours of fighting fires and suffering severe internal explosions caused by leaking gasoline vapors, the ship was abandoned and scuttled with a loss of 216 men.

USS Saratoga (CV-3) was hit and sent back for repairs multiple times during the war. Her first torpedo hit from the Japanese submarine I-6 on 11 January 1942 killed nine men. She returned to active duty the day after the Battle of Midway ended. On 31 August 1942, a torpedo from I-26 sent her back to Pearl Harbor until November. On 21 February 1945, Saratoga was repeatedly hit by five bombs and three kamikaze aircraft in a three-minute span, killing 123 of her crew and wounding 192. She was sunk by Atomic testing during Operation Crossroads in 1946.

USS Yorktown (CV-5) was damaged during the Battle of Coral Sea by an armor-piercing bomb which killed and wounded 66 men. She was promptly repaired in three days' time and returned in time to fight the Battle of Midway. This time she was hit by two bombs and two torpedoes and left dead in the water with a severe list. Efforts to bring the ship home were dashed when Yorktown was torpedoed by Japanese submarine I-168 on 7 June 1942.

USS Enterprise (CV-6) was damaged several times in the war. The first was during the Battle of the Eastern Solomons, in which 74 men were killed and 95 wounded by dive bomber attacks, and again during the Battle of Santa Cruz when 44 crewmen died. After many close calls throughout the war, she was struck by a kamikaze Zero fighter on her forward elevator, killing 14 men. Enterprise was the most decorated ship in the history of the US Navy. She was scrapped in 1960.

USS Wasp (CV-7) was operating some 150 nautical miles southeast of San Cristobal Island on 15 Sept 1942 when she sighted torpedo wakes coming straight for her. Wasp was struck by three torpedoes fired from Japanese submarine I-19 which hit the vicinity of the ship's gasoline and magazines. Wasp was rocked by several catastrophic explosions over the next few minutes and it quickly became apparent that her condition was beyond saving. The order to abandon ship was given ten minutes after the torpedoes hit. Wasp sank with the loss of 193 dead and 366 wounded.

USS Hornet (CV-8) was hit by multiple bombs, torpedoes, and damaged aircraft during the Battle of Santa Cruz on 26 October 1942 after repeated strikes by Japanese carrier aircraft. Although an effort was made to tow the ship to safety, further air attacks prompted her abandonment and scuttling. 140 sailors from Hornet died as a result of her sinking.

USS Essex (CV-9) was hit by a low-flying kamikaze along the port edge of her flight deck on 25 November 1944. The kamikaze crashed among planes waiting for takeoff, causing extensive damage, killing 15 men and wounding 44. The ship resumed flight operations a few hours later. She was scrapped in 1975 after a prestigious career.

USS Intrepid (CV-11) was struck by a torpedo bomber during Operation Hailstone which killed 11 men. During raids on Luzon on 25 November 1944, Intrepid was hit by two kamikaze aircraft which left 66 men dead, sending the ship home for repairs. On 16 April 1945, a kamikaze aircraft dove through the flight deck, killing eight and wounding 21, but the ship was landing planes again within three hours. Today she is a museum ship in New York City.

USS Franklin (CV-13) was damaged by aircraft bombs on 19 March 1945, 50 miles south of Shikoku, Japan during the Battle of Okinawa. She survived over 40 huge explosions of her own munitions but was able to make it back to the states under her own power, despite suffering 798 killed and 487 wounded. Although repaired, the ship did not return to active service and was scrapped in 1969.

USS Ticonderoga (CV-14) was hit by two kamikazes on 21 January 1945. The first crashed through her flight deck and its bomb went off just above the hangar deck, setting afire several aircraft. Minutes later the second kamikaze struck the island superstructure, causing extensive damage and wounding or killing many high-ranking officers. The carrier suffered 143 killed and 202 wounded. She was scrapped in 1975 after a prestigious career.

USS Randolph (CV-15) was hit by a Japanese twin-engine "Frances" type flying level on the starboard side. The plane impacted the edge of the flight deck 15 ft from the stern. The bomb load penetrated the hull and below the flight deck before exploding violently, killing 27 men. Pieces of the Japanese plane as well as the three bodies of its crew were scattered across the flight deck. Randolph was scrapped in 1975 after a prestigious career.

USS Lexington (CV-16) was struck by a torpedo bomber off Kwajalein on 4 December 1943, killing nine men. She was back in action by early March after repairs. On 5 November 1944, a kamikaze aircraft struck the ship's island, causing extensive damage and killing 50 men. Today she is a museum ship in Corpus Christi, Texas.

USS Bunker Hill (CV-17) was severely damaged by two kamikaze planes striking the carrier within 30 seconds on 11 May 1945 off Okinawa, killing 390 men and wounding 264. The ship was knocked out of the war and although repaired, she did not see active service after World War II. She was scrapped in 1973.

USS Wasp (CV-18), on 19 March 1945, was hit with a 500 lb armor-piercing bomb which penetrated both the flight and hangar decks, then exploded in the crew's galley. Many of her shipmates were having breakfast after being at general quarters all night. 102 crewmen were lost. Despite the losses, Wasp continued operations with 27 minutes of the strike. She was scrapped in 1973 after a prestigious career.

USS Hancock (CV-19): On 25 November 1944, a fire exploded an incoming kamikaze some 300 ft (91 m) above the ship, but a section of its fuselage landed amidships and burst into flames. On January 21, a plane returning from a sortie made a normal landing, taxied forward abreast of the ship's island and disintegrated in a blinding explosion that killed 50 men and wounded 75. On 7 April 1945, a kamikaze cartwheeled across the flight deck and crashed into a group of planes, while its bomb hit the port catapult causing a tremendous explosion, killing 62 and wounding 71. The ship was scrapped in 1977 after a prestigious career.

=== Aircraft carrier, light (CVL) ===
USS Independence (CVL-22) was attacked on 20 November 1943 by a group of aircraft low on the water. Six were shot down, but the aircraft launched at least five torpedoes, one of which hit the carrier's starboard quarter. Seriously damaged with 17 dead and 23 wounded, the ship steamed to Funafuti on 23 November for emergency repairs. Independence returned to San Francisco on 2 January 1944 for more permanent repairs. She survived the war and atomic bomb tests at Operation Crossroads to be scuttled off California in 1951.

USS Princeton (CVL-23) was off the Philippines when on 24 October 1944, shortly before 10:00 am, she was attacked by a lone D4Y 'Judy' dive bomber which dropped a single bomb, striking the carrier between the elevators, and punching through the hangar before detonating. Although structural damage was minor, a fire broke out and quickly spread due to burning gasoline, thus causing further explosions, so she was scuttled.

USS Birmingham and USS Irwin approached and attempted to fight the fire and rescue crew members. A few hours later, a second, larger explosion shook the Princeton, possibly caused by an explosion of one or more bombs in the magazine. Birmingham suffered extensive damage to her superstructure and numerous casualties. Irwin was also damaged, but stayed close to rescue survivors.

By 16:00, the fires were out of control and the remaining personnel were evacuated. At 17:49, after being torpedoed by USS Reno, an enormous explosion destroyed the entire forward section and sent flames and debris up to 2,000 feet into the air. Princeton sank at approximately 17:50 with a loss of 108 men; however, 233 men were killed and 426 wounded on the USS Birmingham.

USS Belleau Wood (CVL-24): On 30 October 1944 off the Philippines, gunners on Belleau Wood shot down a kamikaze over the ship which fell on her flight deck aft, causing several fires and igniting ammunition in planes on deck awaiting take off. 92 men were killed during this attack. She survived the war to serve for a short time in the French Navy, then was sold for scrap in 1960.

USS Cabot (CVL-28): On 25 November 1944, Cabot had fought off several kamikaze when one, already flaming from hits, crashed into the flight deck on the port side, destroying the still-firing 20 mm gun platform, disabling the 40 mm mounts and a gun director. Another kamikaze crashed close aboard and showered the port side with shrapnel and burning debris. 62 men were killed or wounded, but she continued to maintain her station in formation and operate effectively. Temporary repairs were made. She served in the Spanish Navy after World War II for 22 years and was finally scrapped in 2002 after preservation attempts failed.

=== Aircraft carrier, escort (CVE) ===
USS Block Island (CVE-21) was torpedoed off the Canary Islands at 20:13 on 29 May 1944. The German submarine U-549 had slipped undetected through her screen. The submarine put three torpedoes into the carrier before being sunk herself by depth charges. The carrier lost six men in the attack; the remaining 951 were picked up by the escort screen. This was the only American carrier sunk in the Atlantic during the war.

USS Sangamon (CVE- 26) was rearming at Kerama Retto during the battle of Okinawa on 4 May 1945, when at 19:55 a Ki-45 kamikaze crashed into the center of her deck; its bomb penetrated the flight deck and exploded in the hangar. Initial damage was extensive, fires broke out on the flight deck, the hangar deck, and in the fuel deck, communications from the bridge were lost within 15 minutes, and the ship was soon out of control.

By 20:15, however, steering control had been established, and the ship was brought back to a course that helped the crew fight the myriad fires scattered over the CVE. By 22:30, all fires were under control. The attack killed 46 and wounded 116.

USS Suwannee (CVE-27) was operating off Samar when at 07:40 on 25 October 1944, her task force "Taffy 1" was jumped by land-based planes from Davao in the first deliberate suicide attack of the war. After shooting down several kamikazes Suwanee was hit by an enemy plane at 08:04 about 40 feet forward of the after elevator.

The plane's bomb compounded the fracture when it exploded between the flight and hangar decks, tearing a 25-foot gash in the latter and causing a number of casualties. Within two hours, her flight deck was sufficiently repaired to enable the escort carrier to resume air operations.

Just after noon on 26 October, another group of kamikazes jumped "Taffy 1". A Zero crashed into Suwanee's flight deck at 1240 and careened into a torpedo bomber which had just been recovered. The two planes erupted upon contact as did nine other planes on her flight deck. The resulting fire burned for several hours, but was finally brought under control. The casualties for 25–26 October were 107 dead and 160 wounded.

USS Santee (CVE- 29) was sailing as part of "Taffy 1" off the northern coast of Mindanao on 25 October 1944 when at 07:40, a kamikaze managed to sneak over the formation and dove into the center of Santee, crashing through the flight deck and starting fires in the hangar deck. These fires were quickly brought under control and by 07:51 the ship was fully operational. 16 men were killed and 27 wounded.

Minutes later at 07:56, a torpedo fired from Japanese submarine I-56 struck the ship, causing flooding of several compartments and creating a 6° list to starboard. Emergency repairs were completed by 09:35 and the carrier had kept station with the other ships in the group.

USS Liscome Bay (CVE-56) was operating off the Gilbert Islands, 24 November 1943 when she was torpedoed by Japanese submarine I-175 around 05:10. The torpedo struck behind the after engine room, and detonated the ship's bomb magazine, causing a devastating explosion that engulfed the ship and sent shrapnel flying as far as 5,000 yards (4,600 m) away.

The entire task force was rocked by the explosion, but no other ships were significantly damaged. A mushroom cloud erupted, rising thousands of feet above the wreck of Liscome Bay. The detonation sheared off nearly the entire rear end of the carrier, killing everyone behind the forward bulkhead of the aft engine room. Both the hangar and flight decks were heavily damaged.

The forward part of the hangar was immediately engulfed in flames, igniting the few remaining planes on the flight deck. Planes fell off the carrier's deck. Steam, compressed air, and fire-main pressure were lost throughout the ship. Fires on the flight deck caused ammunition within the burning aircraft and anti-aircraft guns to detonate, further complicating matters. The gasoline-coated water surrounding Liscome Bay caught fire, hampering survivors' efforts to escape.

At 05:33, only 23 minutes after the explosion, Liscome Bay listed to starboard and sank; 53 officers and 591 enlisted men were killed, while 272 survived.

USS Manila Bay (CVE-61) was operating off the Philippines when on 5 January 1945 she was attacked by kamikazes. Two A6M Zeros headed for Manila Bay, evading anti-aircraft fire and strafing as they approached. The first plane hit at the base of the island superstructure, its bomb penetrating the deck and exploding in the hangar. The second plane hit the sea just a few yards from the carrier.

Fires were quickly extinguished and within 24 hours the ship was back in action. 22 men were killed and 56 wounded by this attack.

USS Natoma Bay (CVE-62) was operating off Okinawa when at 06:35, on 7 June 1945, after having maneuvered through typhoon weather, Natoma Bay was closed by an A6M Zero, broad on the port quarter and low on the water. Changing course, it came in over the stern, fired incendiary ammunition at the bridge, and on reaching the island structure, nosed over and crashed the flight deck.

The engine, propeller and a bomb tore a hole in the flight deck, 12 by 20 feet, while the explosion of the bomb damaged the deck of the forecastle and the anchor windlass beyond repair and ignited a nearby fighter.

Four of Natoma Bay's crew were wounded while one officer was killed. A second Zero was splashed by the ship's port batteries. The damage control party immediately extinguished the blaze and set about emergency repairs. The next strike was cancelled, but the following one, against Miayako Shima, took place as scheduled at 10:30.

USS St. Lo (CVE-63) was operating 60 miles east of Samar on the morning of 25 October 1944 as a part of "Taffy 3" when a huge Japanese task force of four battleships, seven heavy cruisers, two light cruisers, and 19 destroyers appeared on the horizon. Leading the Japanese force was the super-battleship Yamato, the largest battleship of all time, which weighed more than all the ships of "Taffy 3" combined. "Taffy 3" was pitifully weak in comparison, boasting only six escort carriers, four destroyers, and four destroyer escorts.

Nevertheless, the Americans accepted battle and many of the escorting destroyers would valiantly sacrifice themselves to prevent the Japanese from sailing into Leyte Gulf where the bulk of transports for the Philippines invasion was. Throughout the battle, St. Lo would avoid damage from Japanese shells. After several hours of pursuit, the confused Japanese task force reversed course and retired from battle, much to the bewilderment of the Americans.

Just 90 minutes after the engagement ended with Japanese surface forces, "Taffy 3" was attacked by the first organized kamikaze attack of WWII. At 10:51, an A6M Zero kamikaze dove on White Plains but was hit by AA fire and turned towards St. Lo. The plane came homing in on the carrier from a low angle directly astern and crashed into the flight deck aft, its burning wreckage skidding across the flight deck while its 500 lb bomb penetrated the flight deck to explode among rearming and refueling aircraft. A gasoline fire erupted, followed by six secondary explosions, including detonations of the ship's torpedo and bomb magazine.

St. Lo was engulfed in flames and sank 30 minutes later. Of the 889 men aboard, 113 were killed or missing and approximately 30 others died of their wounds. St. Lo became the first major warship to sink as the result of a kamikaze attack.

USS White Plains (CVE-66) was sailing as a part of "Taffy 3" about 60 miles east of Samar on 25 October 1944 when a powerful Japanese task force surprised the outnumbered and outgunned Americans. The enemy formation included the Yamato, the largest and most powerful battleship ever built, armed with 18.1-inch naval rifles. Yamato opened fire at 06:59 at an estimated range of 34,544 yards, targeting White Plains with her first four salvos. Yamato's third salvo was a near miss landing at 07:04. One shell from this salvo exploded beneath the turn of White Plains port bilge near frame 142, near her aft (starboard) engine room. While the ship was not struck directly, the mining effect of the under-keel explosion severely damaged her hull, deranged her starboard machinery and tripped all of the circuit breakers in her electrical network.

Prompt and effective damage control restored power and communications within three minutes and she was able to remain in formation by overspeeding her port engine to compensate. Fortunately, the black smoke resulting from the sudden loss of boiler intake air pressure had convinced the crews of Yamato and Nagato they had scored a hit and subsequently shifted their fire. White Plains five-inch gun crew claimed six hits on heavy cruiser Chōkai. For the next two and a half hours, the Japanese force chased "Taffy 3" southward and subjected the escort carriers and their counterattacking screen to a heavy-caliber cannonade before miraculously giving up the pursuit and retiring from the Battle off Samar.

The retreat by Kurita's surface force, however, did not end the ordeal for White Plains and her fellow warships. After a 90-minute respite, they suffered harassment from a different quarter. At 10:50 hours, a formation of nine Japanese Navy Zero kamikaze planes attacked in the first organized suicide attack of the war. Two of them singled out White Plains as their victim. Her antiaircraft gunners responded, hitting one of the intruders, which immediately changed course and crashed into USS St. Lo, which eventually sank. The other aircraft continued on toward White Plains, but her antiaircraft guns finally brought it down yards astern, scattering debris all over the ship's deck and sides, but causing only 11 relatively minor casualties.

After the battle, White Plains was repaired and returned to service to ferry fighters to Okinawa. After the war she participated in Operation Magic Carpet.

USS Kalinin Bay (CVE-68) was steaming about 60 miles east of Samar before dawn 25 October 1944 as a part of "Taffy 3" when a huge Japanese surface task force of battleships and cruisers came across the much weaker American force of escort carriers and destroyers.

As the trailing ship in the escort caravan, Kalinin Bay came under intense enemy shell fire. Though partially protected by chemical smoke, a timely rain squall, and valiant counterattacks of screening destroyers and destroyer escorts, she took the first of 15 direct hits at 07:50. At 17,000 yards, the Japanese battleship Haruna hit Kalinin Bay with a 14-inch (356 mm) shell which disabled her aircraft elevator.

By 08:00, the heavy cruiser Haguro, which was steaming off her port quarter, closed to within 18,000 yards. Kalinin Bay responded to their straddling salvos with fire from her five-inch gun, which only intensified the enemy fire. At 8:18. the heavy cruiser Tone joined in, and three 8-inch (203 mm) shells struck her within minutes of each other. At 08:30, the light cruiser Yahagi and destroyers Yukikaze, Isokaze, Urakaze, and Nowaki steamed over the horizon off her starboard quarter. The closing ships opened fire from about 14,500 yards, and, as screening ships engaged the cruisers and laid down concealing smoke, Kalinin Bay shifted her fire, trading shots with Japan's Destroyer Squadron 10. A few of their torpedoes came dangerously close to hitting Kalinin Bay before fighters destroyed them with strafing runs.

However, Tone and Haguro re-engaged Kalinin Bay and closed to 10,100 yards; she took eleven-inch 8-inch (203 mm) hits from the now obscured cruisers. One shell passed through the flight deck and into the communications area, where it destroyed all the radar and radio equipment.

At 09:30, the enemy fleet suddenly broke off action and turned northward. Just 90 minutes after the Japanese fleet turned away, "Taffy 3" came under attack from kamikaze planes. Four diving A6M Zeros attacked Kalinin Bay from astern and the starboard quarter. Intense fire splashed two close aboard, but a third plane crashed into the port side of the flight deck. The fourth hit destroyed the aft port stack. Kalinin Bay suffered extensive structural damage during the morning's furious action, and counted five dead among her sixty casualties. Following her repairs, the ship served as a replenishment carrier and eventually in "Magic Carpet".

USS Fanshaw Bay (CVE-70) was supporting the invasion of Saipan when on 17 June 1944 when at 18:52, a Japanese bomber made a run for Fanshaw Bay, dropping a 250 lb bomb as it flew 1,500 ft above the carrier. The bomb penetrated into her aft aircraft elevator, and detonating within the hangar bay, some 5 ft below the flight deck. Shrapnel was launched through the hangar, instantly killing eleven men who had taken up position forward of the elevator. The blast had enough force to rupture a fire main, sever electrical cables, and even eject depth charges from the bomb bays of the Avengers stored within the hangar deck. In addition, several fires were kindled, total steering control was lost, and the ship acquired a 3° list to the port.

Although the fires were quickly put under control by the crew, several of her aircraft were compelled to land on other carriers as a result of the blazes. The ship suffered 14 dead and 23 wounded from the attack. Fanshaw Bay retired from operations and proceeded to Pearl Harbor for a long period of repairs. She returned to duty in September.

On 25 October 1944 while sailing as a component of "Taffy 3" off Samar, Fanshaw Bay's task force came into direct contact with a much more powerful Japanese task force of several battleships and cruisers. Fanshaw Bay launched as many planes as possible to harry the Japanese ships while fleeing to the safe concealment of rain squalls. At 7:50, the heavy cruiser Haguro took her under aim and two 8-inch (203 mm) shells made impact with her hull.

USS Kitkun Bay (CVE-71) had been dodging shells from Japanese cruisers off Samar on the morning of 25 October 1944 when her task force "Taffy 3" was hit by suicide planes. One A6M Zero rolled into a dive, crashed into the port catwalk and fell into the sea. The kamikaze punctured more than 100 holes in the bulkheads, doors, and gasoline lines. One man was killed and four were wounded. Damage was minimal and the ship stayed in action.

On 7 January 1945, the ship was targeted by a Ki-43 "Oscar" kamikaze at 18:57. The enemy plane crashed through the port side at the waterline amidships tearing a hole in the ship's side approximately 20 feet long and nine feet high. An explosion and large fire flared up simultaneously with a hit by a five-inch round from one of the other ships, which burst close to the carrier's bow below a gun sponson, killing and wounding several men. The attack killed 16 men and wounded another 37. The ship was sent home for repairs but eventually rejoined the fight against Japan.

USS Gambier Bay (CVE-73) was fired on and hit by multiple Japanese warships during the Battle off Samar when the highly outgunned and outnumbered task force "Taffy 3" was engaged by a surface group consisting of four battleships, including Japanese battleship Yamato, the largest battleship ever built.

Yamato took Gambier Bay under fire and scored a first salvo 18.1-inch (46 cm) shell hit at 22,000 yards. At 8:20, Yamato scored a hit which flooded Gambier Bay's engine room, cutting her speed to 10 knots as she began to gradually slow as Yamato followed with another two hits at 8:23. After taking at least 15 hits from Yamato, Gambier Bay was sinking and dead in the water as the crew began to abandon ship. The light cruiser Noshiro shelled the dying Gambier Bay as she capsized and sank at 9:11.

USS Kadashan Bay (CVE-76) was operating off Luzon on 8 January 1945 when at 07:46 a Ki-43 Oscar plunged down towards the carrier. The aircraft came under heavy anti-aircraft fire but it continued aiming directly for the carrier's bridge.

Perhaps as a result of the concentrated fire, it then plunged down, striking below the bridge at the waterline, tearing a 9 ft by 17.5 ft hole, destroying the junior officers' quarters. A brief gasoline fire broke out, which was quickly put under control. A more pressing concern was flooding, which was accentuated by the ship's turn.

Her gasoline system was inoperative, and her bow sank 7 ft below design specifications. Remarkably, no one was killed, and only three crewmen were wounded. Kadashan Bay would have to retire for repairs before finishing the war.

USS Ommaney Bay (CVE-79) was hit by a kamikaze attack south of Mindoro, Philippine Islands, on 4 January 1945. At 17:12, a Yokosuka P1Y penetrated the screen undetected and made for Ommaney Bay, approaching directly towards the ship's bow. The enemy plane's approach was partially concealed by the blinding glare of the sun. The plane sliced across the superstructure with its wing, collapsing it onto the flight deck. It then veered into her flight deck on the forward starboard side. Two bombs were released; one of them penetrated the flight deck and detonated below, setting off a series of explosions among the fully gassed planes on the forward third of the hangar deck. The second bomb passed through the hangar deck, ruptured the fire main on the second deck, and exploded near the starboard side.

Men struggling with the terrific blazes on the hangar deck soon had to abandon it because of the heavy black smoke from the burning planes and exploding .50 caliber ammunition. Destroyer escorts found it difficult to assist Ommaney Bay, because of the intense heat, the ammunition going off, and the real possibility that a catastrophic detonation could be triggered by the blaze.

At 17:45, wounded crew began to be taken off the ship, and by 17:50 the entire topside area had become untenable. In addition, the stored torpedo warheads threatened to detonate at any time. The order to abandon ship was given. Captain Young was the last man to evacuate the burning wreck. At 18:18, the torpedoes stored in the aft end of the ship finally detonated, collapsing the flight deck and launching debris onto the destroyers who were rescuing survivors. Two crewmen from the USS Eichenberger were struck and killed by airborne debris. At 19:58 the carrier was scuttled by a torpedo from the destroyer USS Burns, taking with her 95 men. Seven survivors were killed by a kamikaze attack a few days later on USS Columbia.

USS Bismarck Sea (CVE-95) was operating off Iwo Jima, Volcano Islands, on 21 February 1945 when her task force was hit by kamikazes. Despite the heavy gunfire, a kamikaze approached Bismarck Sea from the starboard side at a low angle, which the anti-aircraft guns could not depress sufficiently to fire at. The plane plowed in under the first 40mm gun (aft), crashing through the hangar deck and striking the ship's magazines.

The fire was nearly under control when about two minutes later, a second plane, likely attracted by the ship's glow against the darkness, struck the aft elevator shaft, exploding on impact, killing the majority of the fire-fighting party and destroying the fire fighting salt-water distribution system, thus preventing any further damage control.

At 19:00, the crew assembled at their "abandon ship" locations, and the engines were cut. Captain John L. Pratt issued the order to abandon ship at 19:05. As the crew abandoned ship, a large explosion, likely from the detonation of the torpedoes within the hangar deck, rocked the ship. This explosion tore much of the aft-end of the ship to shreds, and she quickly acquired a list to the starboard. At 20:07, the ship's island detached from the hull and slid into the water. Two hours after the dual kamikaze attacks, at 21:15, Bismarck Sea sank with the loss of 318 men, the last US Navy aircraft carrier to be lost during World War II.

== Heavy cruiser (CA) ==
USS Pensacola (CA-24) was sailing on 29 November 1942 with TF 67 to intercept a Japanese destroyer-transport force expected off Guadalcanal the next night. Just before midnight of the 30th, the American ships transited Lengo Channel and headed past Henderson Field on Guadalcanal as the Japanese task group steamed on a southerly course west of Savo Island to enter "Ironbottom Sound".

In the Battle of Tassafaronga that followed, American destroyers launched torpedoes as the enemy range came within 5 miles of Pensacola's cruiser formation. Now gun flashes, tracers, and star shell candles stained the black inky darkness. Pensacola turned left to prevent collision with two damaged American ships ahead of her.

Silhouetted by the burning American cruisers, she came into the Japanese line of fire. A torpedo from the destroyer Kawakaze hit her below the mainmast on the portside. Her engine room flooded, three gun turrets went out of commission, and her oil tanks ruptured to make a soaked torch of her mast.

The oil-fed flames engulfed Pensacola's main deck aft where ammunition exploded. Only supreme effort and skillful damage control by her men saved the ship. The fire punctuated by the frightful explosion of eight-inch projectiles in her Number 3 turret gradually subsided. Pensacola made steady progress toward Tulagi. She arrived there still aflame. After 12 hours the last fire was quenched. Her dead numbered 125 men and 67 men were wounded. She would be out of action for several months.

On 17 February 1945 Pensacola was bombarding Iwo Jima when she was hit by enemy gun batteries on shore which killed 19 men and wounded 119. Despite the damage, she was temporarily repaired and resumed bombardment and counter-battery fire of enemy positions. Pensacola would finish the war and survived Operation Crossroads to be sunk as a target ship in 1948.

USS Salt Lake City (CA-25) was sailing with TF 64 on the night of 11 October 1942 to intercept a Japanese resupply convoy headed for Guadalcanal. The American task force sent up a surprise ambush in the dark of night to "cross the T" and inflict several losses to the Japanese in the resulting Battle of Cape Esperance.

During the battle, Salt Lake City fired on multiple Japanese ships scoring many hits. Kinugasa and Salt Lake City exchanged fire with each other, each hitting the other several times, causing minor damage to Kinugasa and damaging one of Salt Lake City's boilers, reducing her speed.

Salt Lake City would spend the next four months undergoing repairs and replenishment at Pearl Harbor. She would take part in an operation to prevent the Japanese from reinforcing their island garrisons on Attu and Kiska Islands in the Aleutians. Operating with TF 8, contact was made with Japanese ships on 26 March 1943 leading to the Battle of the Komandorski Islands.

Despite being outnumbered two to one, the Americans pressed their attack, hoping to get shots at transports. The enemy responded by opening fire at 20,000 yards. The ensuing battle was a retiring action on the part of the Americans, for the Japanese foiled their attempt to get to the auxiliaries. Salt Lake City received most of the attention and soon received two hits, one of them amidships, mortally wounding two men, but she responded with very accurate fire.

Her rudder stops were carried away, limiting her to 10° course changes. The starboard seaplane caught fire and was jettisoned. Another hit soon flooded forward compartments. Under cover of a thick smokescreen and aggressive torpedo attacks by the destroyers, the American cruisers were able to make an evasive turn, which for a while allowed the range to open. Salt Lake City soon began taking hits again and her boiler fires died one by one. Salt water had entered the fuel oil feed lines. There was now cause for grave concern; she lay dead in the water, and the Japanese ships were closing fast. Luckily, she was hidden in the smoke, and the enemy was not aware of her plight.

The destroyers charged the Japanese cruisers and began to draw the fire away from the damaged Salt Lake City. Her engineers purged the fuel lines and fired the boilers. With fresh oil supplying the fires, she built up steam and gained headway. Salt Lake City would be repaired and participated in several more campaigns in the war, earning 11 battle stars for its service. Like her sister, she was sunk as a target ship in 1948.

USS Northampton (CA-26) was operating with a cruiser-destroyer force on 30 November 1942 to prevent the Japanese from reinforcing their garrison on Guadalcanal. During the Battle of Tassafaronga, Northampton along with four additional cruisers and four destroyers all opened fire on an unsuspecting Japanese task force of eight destroyers. The Japanese did not return fire for several minutes as the Americans stunning cannonade scored many hits and sinking one destroyer; Takanami.

The Japanese destroyers began laying a smokescreen and launched more than 45 "Long Lance" torpedoes towards the American column. Four of the five American cruisers were hit by torpedoes, killing hundreds of men. Northampton was the last remaining cruiser - the rest either torpedoed or forced to turn away - and turned northwest, putting her in the crosshairs of the Japanese destroyer Kagerō and Makinami, which dumped their torpedoes to the port side, and scored two hits. One hit 10 feet below the waterline abreast the after engine room, and four seconds later, the second hit 40 feet further aft, ripping away decks and bulkheads. The after engine room flooded, three of four shafts ceased turning, and flaming oil sprayed over the ship; she took on water rapidly and began to list.

Three hours later, as she began to sink stern-first, she had to be abandoned. So orderly and controlled was the process that loss of life was surprisingly light. 50 men were killed during the battle. Most of the survivors were picked up within an hour by destroyers of Task Force 67. About 40 crewmen spent the rest of the night in two life rafts.

USS Chester (CA-27) had been bombarding Taroa Island on 1 February 1942 when she came under heavy air attack from land-based dive bombers. The ship was hit with a 135 lb bomb in the well deck which killed 8 and wounded 38. The ship returned to Pearl Harbor for repairs.

While cruising in support of the operations in the Solomons, specifically north of the New Hebrides Islands, Chester was hit by a torpedo from the Japanese submarine I-176 on the starboard side, amidships on 20 October which killed 11 and wounded 12. She returned to Espiritu Santo under her own power for emergency repairs on 23 October.

Chester would earn 11 battle stars for her service in WWII. The ship would be scrapped in 1959 after years in mothball.

USS Louisville (CA-28) was operating with TF 38 on 5 January 1945 off Lingayen Gulf when she was hit by a kamikaze which crashed into the No. 2 eight-inch gun turret, killing 1, wounding 17, including the captain, and knocking the turret out of commission. A second kamikaze hit the ship the next day on 6 January 1945, crashing into the starboard side signal bridge, and fatally injuring Rear Admiral Theodore E. Chandler commander of cruiser Division 4. 42 crewmen were killed and 125 wounded by the attack. Despite the damage, Louisville continued bombarding enemy positions and shot down several planes before she put in for repairs.

The ship rejoined the fleet in time for the battle of Okinawa. On 5 June 1945, she was again hit by a kamikaze (initially identified as a friendly plane). Four twin 20 AA cannon opened up to set the kamikaze ablaze prior to hitting Louisville which killed eight sailors on a quad 40 mm AA gun mount, injured 45 sailors, bent the number 1 smoke stack, cut Louisville's seaplane off and left only the pontoon on the catapult. Louisville was back on the gun line by 9 June.

She survived the war to be scrapped in 1959. She was awarded 13 battle stars for her WWII service.

USS Chicago (CA-29) was patrolling the waters just south of Savo Island on the night of 10 August 1942 when at 01:43 flares dropped from Japanese planes illuminated Chicago in the dark night, giving her position away to a Japanese surface task force of 5 heavy and 2 light cruisers which had managed to sneak into firing range undetected.

At 01:47, a torpedo, probably from Japanese heavy cruiser Kako, hit Chicago's bow, sending a shock wave throughout the ship that damaged the main battery director. A second torpedo hit but failed to explode, and a shell hit the cruiser's mainmast, killing two crewmen. Chicago steamed west for 40 minutes away from the battle to tend her torpedo damage.

After repairs in San Francisco, Chicago returned to the theater of combat. On 29 January 1943 while escorting a convoy south of Guadalcanal her task force came under repeated air attacks from Japanese G4M and G3M torpedo bombers in what would be known as the Battle of Rennell Island.

During the attacks, two burning Japanese planes silhouetted the American ships, providing enough light for further torpedo runs; at 19:38 two hits on Chicago caused severe flooding and loss of power. The ship came to a dead stop. In pitch darkness, Louisville managed to take the crippled Chicago under tow and slowly headed south, away from the battle area, escorted by the rest of the task force.

The next morning of 30 Jan, the fleet tug Navajo took over the tow job from Louisville, which was accomplished at 08:00. At 16:00 eleven G4M torpedo bombers launched an attack on the damaged cruiser. Although sustaining several losses, the G4M bombers managed to hit Chicago with four torpedoes at 16:24; one forward of the bridge and three others in her engineering spaces.

Captain Ralph O. Davis gave the order to abandon ship shortly before Chicago sank stern first 20 minutes later, taking 62 of her crew with her, most of them killed by the torpedo detonations. Escorting ships rescued her 1,049 survivors.

USS Houston (CA-30) and her task force were sailing to intercept a Japanese invasion convoy bound for Makassar on 4 February 1942 when she became the target of an enemy aerial bomb that put Turret 3 out of commission, killing 48 men and wounding 20. Houston subsequently sought refuge at Tjilatjap to work on repairs and to tend to wounded sailors.

Receiving word that the major Japanese invasion force was approaching Java protected by a formidable surface unit, Houston sailed on 26 February 1942 with a task force of one other heavy cruiser, three light cruisers and ten destroyers to intercept. The Japanese force consisted of 2 heavy cruisers, 2 light cruisers, 14 destroyers and 10 transports. Both sides sighted each other at 16:00 on 27 February and opened fire soon after closing range; marking the start of the Battle of Java Sea.

Poor accuracy affected both sides, but the Allied fleet took more damage and was unable to attack the Japanese transports. At 18:00 the Allied force disengaged, having lost several ships with no success attacking the transports. After dispatching all remaining destroyers back to Surabaya, the Allied task force commander attempted to evade the Japanese escort group but at 23:00 encountered the enemy warships again.

The Allied flagship and another cruiser were sunk by torpedoes, leaving Houston and HMAS Perth alone. Both ships managed to make it to Tjilatjap on 28 Feb, but were unable to resupply or refuel completely. While attempting to navigate through the Sunda Strait the two cruisers ran into a Japanese invasion task force with 5 cruisers and 12 destroyers around 23:30.

During the desperate battle, the two cruisers managed to sink and ground four enemy transports and inflicted damage on four other warships, but Houston and Perth were both severely outnumbered and fought a fierce battle at close range with the Japanese. At midnight, Perth attempted to force a way through the destroyers, but was hit by four torpedoes in the space of a few minutes, then subject to close range gunfire until sinking at 02:40 on 1 March.

Houston was engaged on all sides at ranges never greater than 5000 yards, taking many hits, including a hit on the bridge which killed the captain. After being struck with two torpedoes, with Japanese destroyers that were firing less than 1500 yards away with cannon and machine guns, the order to abandon ship was given. She rolled on her side and went down at 03:00 after receiving a final torpedo hit. 693 men went down with Houston, while 368 survived the sinking to become prisoners of the Japanese. 77 more of Houston's crew would die while in captivity.

USS New Orleans (CA-32) was sailing on 30 November 1942 as part of a task force to interpret Japanese destroyers resupplying Guadalcanal. The two sides clashed in the Battle of Tassafaronga.

When the flagship Minneapolis was struck by two torpedoes, New Orleans, next astern, was forced to sheer away to avoid collision, and ran into the track of a torpedo which detonated the ship's forward magazines and gasoline tanks. The blast severed the ship's entire bow forward of turret two. The bow twisted to port, damaging the ship's hull as it was wrenched free by the ship's momentum, and sank immediately off the aft port quarter. Everyone in turrets one and two perished. New Orleans was forced into a reverse course to starboard and lost steering and communications. A total of 183 men were killed.

With one-quarter of her length gone, slowed to 2 knots, and damage control parties managed to repair the ship enough to sail to Tulagi Harbor near daybreak on 1 December. The crew camouflaged their ship from air attack, jury-rigged a bow of coconut logs, and worked clearing away wreckage. Eleven days later, New Orleans sailed stern-first to avoid sinking to Sydney, Australia, arriving on 24 December While docked in Sydney, the damaged propeller was replaced and other repairs were made, including the installation of a temporary stub bow. On 7 March 1943, she left Sydney for Puget Sound, sailing backward the entire voyage, where a new bow was fitted with the use of Minneapolis's No. 2 Turret. All battle damage was repaired and she was given a major refit.

New Orleans would finish their war with 17 battle stars for her service in WWII, among the highest in the US Navy. She spent her final days in the navy transporting prisoners of war back home. The ship was scrapped in 1959.

USS Portland (CA-33) was among a force of five cruisers and eight destroyers under Daniel J. Callaghan on the night of 12 November 1942 which steamed to counter an approaching Japanese force. They spotted a Japanese force of two battleships, one cruiser and eleven destroyers and immediately opened fire, sinking the Japanese destroyer Akatsuki. Shortly thereafter, Portland was struck by a torpedo fired by either the destroyer Inazuma or the destroyer Ikazuchi at 01:58, causing heavy damage to her stern.

The torpedo struck the starboard side, which blew off both inboard propellers, jammed the rudder five degrees to starboard, and jammed her Number Three turret in train and elevation. A four-degree list was quickly corrected by shifting ballast, but the steering problem could not be overcome and the ship was forced to steam in circles to starboard. The blast disrupted her steering column, forcing her to steer in a circle.

At the end of her first circle, she fired on the battleship Hiei, with her forward turrets. The Japanese ship returned fire, but all salvos passed over the cruiser. In the four six-gun salvos returned by Portland, she succeeded in starting fires in the Japanese ship. At dawn, she was one of three U.S. ships still too damaged to withdraw on her own power. Then again at 06:30, still circling, Portland opened fire on the abandoned hulk of the destroyer Yūdachi at a range of 6 miles. After the sixth salvo, Yūdachi exploded, rolled over, and sank within five minutes. Portland was eventually able to correct the steering problem and withdraw on her own. She suffered 18 killed, 17 wounded in the battle.

After six months of stateside repairs, Portland rejoined the fleet in early June 1943. She would earn 16 battle stars for her service in WWII, and was sold for scrap in 1959.

USS Astoria (CA-34) on the morning of 7 August 1942 entered the waters between Guadalcanal and Florida Islands in the southern Solomons. Throughout the day, she supported the Marines as they landed on Guadalcanal and several smaller islands nearby. The Japanese launched air counterattacks on the 7th–8th, and Astoria helped to defend the transports from those attacks.

On the night of 8/9 Aug, a Japanese force of seven cruisers and a destroyer under Vice Admiral Gunichi Mikawa snuck by Savo Island and attacked the American ships. At the time, Astoria had been patrolling to the east of Savo Island in column behind Vincennes and Quincy. The Japanese came through the channel to the west of Savo Island and opened fire. The Japanese then divided into two separate groups and turned northeast, passing on either side of Astoria and her two consorts. The enemy cruisers began firing on that force at about 0150, and the Astoria began returning fire immediately. She ceased fire briefly because her commanding officer temporarily mistook the Japanese force for friendly ships but soon resumed shooting.

Astoria took no hits in the first four Japanese salvoes, but the fifth ripped into her superstructure, turning her into an inferno amidships. In quick succession, enemy shells put her No. 1 turret out of action and started a serious fire in the plane hangar that burned brightly and provided the enemy with a self-illuminated target.

From that moment on, deadly accurate Japanese gunfire pounded her unmercifully, and she began to lose speed. Turning to the right to avoid Quincy's fire at about 0201, Astoria reeled as a succession of enemy shells struck her aft of the foremast. Soon thereafter, Quincy veered across Astoria's bow, blazing fiercely from bow to stern. Astoria put her rudder over hard left and avoided a collision while her battered sister ship passed aft, to starboard. As the warship turned, Kinugasa's searchlight illuminated her, and men on deck passed the order to No. 2 turret to shoot out the offending light. When the turret responded with Astoria's 12th and final salvo, the shells missed Kinugasa but struck the No. 1 turret of Chōkai.

Astoria lost steering control on the bridge at about 02:25, shifted control to central station, and began steering a zig-zag course south. Before she made much progress, though, the heavy cruiser lost all power. Fortunately, the Japanese chose that exact instant to withdraw. By 03:00, nearly 400 men, including about 70 wounded and many dead, were assembled on the forecastle deck.

Suffering from the effects of at least 65 hits, Astoria fought for her life. A bucket brigade battled the blaze on the gun deck and the starboard passage forward from that deck, and the wounded were moved to the captain's cabin, where doctors and corpsmen proceeded with their care. Eventually, however, the deck beneath grew hot and forced the wounded back to the forecastle. Bagley came alongside Astoria's starboard bow and, by 0445, took all of the wounded off the heavy cruiser's forecastle. Since it appeared that the ship could be saved, a salvage crew of about 325 able-bodied men went back aboard Astoria. Another bucket brigade attacked the fires while the ship's first lieutenant investigated all accessible lower decks. A party of men collected the dead and prepared them for burial.

Nevertheless, the fire below decks increased steadily in intensity, and those topside could hear explosions. Her list increased, first to 10° and then 15°. Her stern lowered in the dark waters, and her bow was distinctively rising. All attempts to shore the shell holes, by then below the waterline due to the increasing list, proved ineffective, and the list increased still more. With the port waterway awash at noon, Commodore William G. Greenman gave the order to abandon ship. Astoria turned over on her port beam, rolled slowly, and settled by the stern, disappearing completely by 12:16. Not one man from the salvage crew lost his life. Officially, 219 men were reported missing or killed.

USS Indianapolis (CA-35) was operating off Okinawa on 31 March 1945; when Indianapolis lookouts spotted a Japanese Nakajima Ki-43 "Oscar" fighter as it emerged from the morning twilight and dived vertically towards the bridge. The ship's 20 mm guns opened fire, but within 15 seconds the plane was over the ship. Tracers converged on it, causing it to swerve, but the pilot managed to release his bomb from a height of 25 ft, then crashing his plane into the sea near the port stern.

The bomb plummeted through the deck, into the crew's mess hall, down through the berthing compartment, and through the fuel tanks before crashing through the keel and exploding in the water underneath. The concussion blew two gaping holes in the keel which flooded nearby compartments, killing nine crewmen. The ship's bulkheads prevented any progressive flooding. Indianapolis, settling slightly by the stern and listing to port, steamed to a salvage ship for emergency repairs. Here, inspection revealed that her propeller shafts were damaged, her fuel tanks ruptured, and her water-distilling equipment ruined. But Indianapolis commenced the long trip across the Pacific, under her own power, to the Mare Island Navy Yard for repairs.

After major repairs and an overhaul, Indianapolis received orders to undertake a top secret mission: to deliver enriched uranium and other important components of the Little Boy atomic device. After leaving San Francisco on 16 July, she arrived at Tinian Island on 26 July. After leaving Tinian the ship stopped at Guam where a number of her crew who had completed their tours of duty were relieved by other sailors. The ship left Guam headed for Leyte on 28 July 1945.

At 00:15 on 30 July, Indianapolis was struck on her starboard side by two Type 95 torpedoes, one in the bow and one amidships, from the Japanese submarine I-58. The explosions caused massive damage. Indianapolis quickly took on a heavy list and settled by the bow. Twelve minutes later, she rolled completely over, then her stern rose into the air and she sank. Some 300 of the 1,195 crewmen aboard went down with the ship.

Many of the survivors were wounded, and all suffered from lack of food and water. Exposure to the elements, dehydration from the hot sun during the day and hypothermia at night, as well as severe desquamation due to exposure to oily salt water, and frequent shark attacks slowly whittled down the survivors. Some killed themselves or other survivors in various states of delirium and hallucinations.

Navy command did not know of the ship's sinking until survivors were spotted in the open ocean three and a half days later. Only 316 of the nearly 900 men set adrift after the sinking survived. 2 more crewmen would die of their wounds.

USS Minneapolis (CA-36) was sailing on 30 November 1942 as flagship of TF 67 which consisted of Fletcher, Perkins, Maury, Drayton, Minneapolis, New Orleans, Pensacola, Honolulu, Northampton, Lamson, and Ladner to intercept a Japanese task force consisting of 8 destroyers; six of them carrying drums full of supplies in a midnight attempt to reinforce and resupply Guadalcanal. At 23:21, Minneapolis opened fire on the destroyer Takanami, which quickly sank after several hits. At 23:27 after firing her ninth salvo, Minneapolis took two torpedo hits. One of the warheads hit her port side, exploding the aviation fuel storage tanks forward of Turret 1 and folding the bow down to over 70 degrees. The second torpedo hit portside aft and knocked out three of the ship's four fire rooms, opening two of them to the sea. 37 of her crew were lost.

The ship was saved by skillful damage control work and was able to reach Tulagi where she was temporarily repaired by her own crew. From August 1943 Minneapolis would go on to serve in every major American operation in the Pacific save Iwo Jima. For her service in WWII she was awarded 16 Battle Stars.

USS San Francisco (CA-38) was protecting unloading transports near Lunga Point, Guadalcanal on 12 November 1942 when a group of Japanese torpedo bombers attacked at 14:08.

At 1416, an already-damaged torpedo bomber dropped its torpedo off San Francisco's starboard quarter. The torpedo passed alongside, but the plane crashed into San Francisco's control aft, swung around that structure, and plunged over the port side into the sea. 16 men were killed, and 29 wounded. Control aft was demolished. The ship's secondary command post, Battle Two, was burned out but was reestablished by dark. The after anti-aircraft director and radar were put out of commission. Three 20 mm mounts were destroyed.

At about midnight on 13 November 1942, San Francisco, in company with heavy cruiser USS Portland, the light cruisers Atlanta, Helena, and Juneau, and eight destroyers, entered Lengo Channel.

At 0125, a Japanese naval force was discovered about 27,000 yd to the northwest. Rear Admiral Callaghan's task group maneuvered to intercept in what became the first engagement in the Naval Battle of Guadalcanal. At 0148, in almost pitch darkness, San Francisco opened fire on an enemy cruiser 3,700 yd off her starboard beam. At 01:51, she trained her guns on a small cruiser or large destroyer 3,300 yd off her starboard bow. Then in an attempt to locate other targets, San Francisco accidentally targeted Atlanta. San Francisco's gunfire caused extensive damage to Atlanta, killing Admiral Scott and most of Atlanta's bridge crew.

At about 0200, San Francisco trained her guns on Kirishima. At the same time, she became the target of Nagara off her starboard bow and of a destroyer that had crossed her bow and was passing down her port side. The enemy battleship joined the cruiser and the destroyer in firing on San Francisco, whose port 5 in battery engaged the destroyer but was put out of action except for one mount. The battleship put the starboard 5 in battery out of commission. San Francisco swung left while her main battery continued to fire on the battleships which, with the cruiser and the destroyer, continued to pound San Francisco. A direct hit on the navigation bridge killed or badly wounded all officers, except for the communications officer.

Steering and engine control were lost and shifted to Battle Two which was soon also knocked out was out of commission by a direct hit from the port side. Control was again lost. Control was reestablished in the conning tower, which soon received a hit from the starboard side. Steering and engine control were temporarily lost, then regained. All communications were now dead. Soon thereafter, the enemy ceased firing. San Francisco followed suit and withdrew eastward along the north coast of Guadalcanal.

77 sailors, including Rear Admiral Daniel J. Callaghan and Captain Cassin Young, had been killed, and 105 wounded in the night's action. The ship had taken 45 hits. Structural damage was extensive, but not fatal. No hits had been received below the waterline. Twenty-two fires had been started and extinguished. The ship reached San Francisco for repairs on 11 December 1942. She would return to the Pacific by 26 February 1943.

San Francisco was one of the Navy's most decorated ships, being awarded 17 Battle stars for her service. She was scrapped in 1961.

USS Quincy (CA-39) While on patrol in the channel between Florida Island and Savo Island, in the early hours of 9 August, Quincy was attacked by a large Japanese naval force during the Battle of Savo Island.

Quincy had seen aircraft flares dropped over other ships in the task force, and had just sounded general quarters and was coming alert when the searchlights from the Japanese column came on. Quincy's captain, Samuel N. Moore, gave the order to commence firing, but the gun crews were not ready. Within a few minutes, Quincy was caught in a crossfire between Aoba, Furutaka, and Tenryū, and was hit heavily and set afire. Quincy's captain ordered his cruiser to charge towards the eastern Japanese column, but as she turned to do so Quincy was hit by two torpedoes from Tenryū, causing severe damage.

Quincy managed to fire a few main gun salvos, one of which hit Chōkai's chart room 20 ft from Admiral Mikawa and killed or wounded 36 men, although Mikawa was not injured. At 02:10, incoming shells killed or wounded almost all of Quincy's bridge crew, including the captain. At 02:16, the cruiser was hit by a torpedo from Aoba, and the ship's remaining guns were silenced. Quincy sustained many direct hits which left 370 men dead and 167 wounded. She sank, bow first, at 02:38, being the first ship sunk in the area which was later known as Ironbottom Sound.

USS Vincennes (CA-44) was patrolling as a screen off Savo Island for unloading transport ships on the night of 9 August 1942 when at about 0145, lookouts spotted flares and star shells to the southward, accompanied by the low rumble of gunfire. The sound of the general quarters alarm soon rang throughout the ship and stirred her to action. Unbeknownst to the men manning the ships to the northward, a powerful enemy force was heading in their direction.

The first Japanese cruiser searchlight beams illuminated Vincennes shortly after 0155, and the American cruiser opened fire with her main battery at the troublesome lights. Within a minute, however, Japanese shells bracketed the ship and Vincennes shuddered under the impact of Japanese eight-inch armor-piercing shells. The bridge, carpenter shop, "Battle II," and radio antenna trunks all were hit by the first salvo.

The ship reeled under the impact of a second salvo of direct hits which set fire to the volatile aircraft in Vincennes's hangar space, and the resultant flames became uncontrollable. A direct hit knocked the aft antiaircraft director overboard. At 02:00, Vincennes heeled to starboard in an attempt to evade enemy gunfire, only to be hit by Japanese torpedoes. One or two "Long Lance" torpedoes ripped into the ship's number 4 fireroom and put it out of action. In moments the report came "Both engine rooms are black and dead."

At 0210, the Japanese retired, leaving Savo Island and the burning hulks of three American cruisers in their wakes. As Vincennes's list increased to port, the order to abandon ship was given at 0230. Serviceable life jackets and rafts were broken out, and the crew began abandoning ship. 332 of her men would go down with her as she rolled over and sank 2.5 miles east of Savo Island at 02:50.

USS Canberra (CA-70) joined TF 38 in October 1944, which was tasked with performing air raids on Okinawa and Taiwan, in preparation for the landings at Leyte. On 13 October 1944, an air-dropped torpedo from a Japanese aircraft hit the cruiser below her armour belt. The explosion killed 23 personnel and exposed the engineering spaces to the ocean, stalling the ship. The ship was docked for repairs from February until October 1945.

== Light cruiser (CL) ==
USS Raleigh (CL-7) was moored on the west side of Ford Island when the Japanese made their surprise attack on Pearl Harbor. In the first attack wave a torpedo passed ahead and a second hit Raleigh portside amidships. The cruiser took such a list to port that it appeared she might capsize. As crew jettisoned topside weight to keep her upright, her gunners helped to destroy five Japanese planes. Several of her crew were wounded, but none were killed.

USS Concord (CL-10) was on a tour to survey the potential use of a number of southeast Pacific islands in national defense and commercial aviation when during this cruise, she suffered a gasoline explosion that killed 24 men including her executive officer, and caused considerable damage, which was repaired at Balboa, Panama.

USS Marblehead (CL-12) was attempting to intercept a Japanese invasion convoy in the Makassar Strait on 4 February 1942 when her task force was attacked by 60 Japanese bombers. Marblehead successfully maneuvered through three attacks. After the third, an enemy plane spiraled toward the cruiser, but her gunners splashed it. The next minute a fourth wave of seven bombers released bombs at Marblehead. Two were direct hits and a third a near-miss close aboard the port bow causing severe underwater damage. Fires swept the ship as she listed to starboard and began to settle by the bow.

Her rudder jammed, Marblehead continuing to steam at full speed, circled to port. Her gunners kept firing, while damage control crews fought the fires and helped the wounded. By 1100, the fires were under control. Before noon the enemy planes departed, leaving the damaged cruiser with 15 dead or mortally wounded and 84 seriously injured. Marblehead underwent extensive repairs before being sent to the Atlantic theater for the rest of the war.

USS Savannah (CL-42) was providing gun support for US troops attacking Salerno Bay as a part of Operation Avalanche on 11 September 1943 when her task force came under assault from the German Luftwaffe unit KG-100. Savannah was hit by a Fritz-X radio-guided bomb at 10:00. The bomb pierced the roof of Turret 3, passed through three decks into the lower ammunition handling room, where it exploded, blowing a hole in her keel and tearing a seam in the cruiser's port side. For at least 30 minutes, secondary explosions in the turret and its ammunition supply rooms hampered firefighting efforts. Savannah's crew quickly sealed off flooded and burned compartments, and corrected her list. With assistance from the salvage tugs Hopi and Moreno; Savannah got underway under her own steam by 17:57 hours and steamed for Malta. She lost 175 crewmen from the attack and ship would be out of action for 10 months.

USS Nashville (CL-43) was shelling Vila airfield on Kolombangara when on the night of 12 May, she suffered a powder charge explosion in one of her forward turrets, killing 18 and injuring 17. She returned to the states for two months of repairs and modernization. On 13 December 1944, she was struck by a kamikaze off Negros Island at 14:15. The plane smashed into the ship's port main deck waist, both of its bombs went off on the deck and gasoline fires engulfed the area near the crash. Ammunition for 5 in, 40 mm, and 20mm cooked off causing more casualties. In this attack 135 men were killed and another 190 wounded. The ship would be sold to the Chilean Navy and would serve until 1985.

USS Boise (CL-47) was with the task force which on the night of 11–12 October 1942, encountered a force of Japanese cruisers and destroyers to the west of Guadalcanal. In the engagement now known as the Battle of Cape Esperance, Boise was hit a number of times, twice by fire from a Japanese heavy cruiser from about 7,500 yards range. One hit exploded upon impact on her armor causing little damage. The other exploded in the six-inch magazine located between Number I and II turrets causing a powder fire and flooding, putting Turrets I, II, and III out of action and causing a number of casualties including 107 killed.

Boise would be repaired and returned to a lengthy service with the Navy during WWII. The ship would be sold to the Argentine Navy and eventually made its way back to the US and finally Japan (ironically) for scrapping in 1978.

USS Honolulu (CL-48) was damaged by a near-miss bomb during the attack on Pearl Harbor, requiring repairs. The ship suffered no casualties during the raid. While operating as part of TF 67 off Kolombangara Island on 13 July 1943 shortly after midnight, contact was made with an enemy cruiser-destroyer force. At 0110, Honolulu opened fire on a Sendai-class cruiser. After three salvos, the target burst into flame and was soon dead in the water. Honolulu shifted fire to an enemy destroyer, which was immediately hit and disappeared. At 0211, a torpedo struck the starboard side of Honolulu, blowing off her bow. Luckily the ship suffered no casualties during the battle. The task force then retired to Tulagi for temporary repairs, and then departed for the large naval base at Pearl Harbor. On 16 August, Honolulu arrived at Pearl Harbor for major repairs and a new bow. She then proceeded to the shipyard at Mare Island, near San Francisco, for more work.

On 20 October 1944 she was screening the invasion force of Leyte when she was attacked by a Japanese torpedo bomber. She was hit on the port side, and once again suffered damage that required a return to the US for repairs. After the war, Honolulu would be mothballed and sold for scrap in 1959.

USS St. Louis (CL-49) engaged an enemy force on 12 July 1942 consisting of the Japanese cruiser Jintsū and five destroyers in the Battle of Kolombangara. During the battle, which raged for over an hour, St. Louis was hit by a torpedo that twisted her bow but caused no serious casualties. The ship would be out of action until November 1942. On 13 January 1944, she arrived in the area between Buka and St. George Channel to support landing operations in the Green Islands, off of New Ireland. On the 14th, at 1945 her group was attacked by six D3A "Val" dive bombers; two of the planes closed on St. Louis. The first plane missed with all three bombs. The second plane scored a hit on the light cruiser. The bomb that hit penetrated the 40 mm clipping room near the No. 6 gun mount, and exploded in the midships living compartment. Twenty-three died and twenty were wounded. Repairs were completed by the end of the month, and in March, St. Louis resumed operations with her division.

On 29 November 1944, St. Louis was operating in Leyte Gulf when she was attacked by several kamikazes. A D4Y dove on St. Louis from the port quarter, and exploded with its bomb on impact. Fires broke out in the cruiser's hangar area and spaces. All crew members of 20 mm guns 7–10 were killed or wounded. At 11:46, there was still no CAP cover over the cruiser's formation, and at 1151, two more enemy planes, both burning, attacked St. Louis. The first was splashed off the port quarter, and the second drove in from starboard and crashed almost on board on the port side. A 20 ft section of armor belt was lost and numerous holes were torn in her hull. By 1152, the ship had taken on a list to port. At 1210, another kamikaze closed on St. Louis but was shot down less than 400 yards away. Sixteen men were lost on St. Louis and 43 wounded. By 1236, the cruiser was back on an even keel. Thirty minutes later, all major fires were out, and salvage work had been started. She would reach California for repairs towards the end of December. St. Louis would earn eleven battle stars for her service in WWII. After the war, the ship was sold to the Brazilian Navy, and sunk in 1980 while being towed to the scrap yard.

USS Helena (CL-50) moored in Pearl Harbor when the base came under attack by Japanese carrier planes. She was mistaken for a battleship and targeted by Japanese torpedo bombers. A torpedo passed underneath Oglala and hit Helena amidships on the starboard side. The blast tore a hole in the hull that flooded the starboard engine and boiler rooms and severed wiring for the main and secondary guns. The ship's crew raced to their battle stations and two minutes after the torpedo hit, the backup forward diesel generator had been turned on, restoring power to the guns. Oglala was less fortunate than Helena, as the blast effect loosened hull plates on the minelayer and caused her to capsize. As Helena's anti-aircraft guns got into action, they helped to fend off further attacks from the second strike wave while other men worked to control flooding by closing the many watertight hatches in the ship.

Two days after the attack, Helena was moved into dry dock No. 2 in Pearl Harbor for an inspection and temporary repairs. Steel plates were welded over the torpedo hole and on 31 December, Helena was refloated. She got underway for Mare Island for permanent repairs and modifications on 5 January 1942. In late July 1942 she would rejoin the fleet in time for Operation Watchtower. Helena would participate in many of the surface actions around Guadalcanal, sinking several Japanese ships and destroying many enemy planes. She would emerge through the campaign with negligible shell damage which killed one man.

On 6 July 1943 Helena was operating as part of TF 68 which was engaging ten Japanese destroyers that were attempting to resupply garrison troops at Kula Gulf. At 01:57 the Americans opened up with radar directed fire, quickly sinking several enemy destroyers. As the American ships turned to engage a second group of destroyers at 02:03; Helena was hit on the port side below the forward most turret which caused a major explosion. The blast destroyed the No. 1 turret, tore open the hull almost to the keel, and severed the bow from the rest of the hull. The rest of the hull began to flood as the force of the blast collapsed bulkheads below turret No. 2. But even after the severe damage inflicted by the first torpedo, the aft main guns continued to fire, and the ship had not yet been fatally damaged. Two minutes after the first torpedo hit, the second and third torpedoes struck the ship in quick succession, much lower in the hull than the first had hit, as much as 15 ft below the waterline. This was below where the ship's belt armor might have reduced the scale of damage inflicted. These hit further aft in the machinery spaces, breaking the keel, flooding the forward engine and boiler rooms, and breaching bulkheads that allowed water into the aft engine room. The flooding disabled the ship's engines and left her immobilized and without electrical power. Another gaping hole had been blasted into the hull, which exacerbated the flooding caused by the first hit. It quickly became clear that Helena would not be able to survive. Two minutes after the third hit, the captain gave the order to abandon ship.

With the keel having been broken by the second and third hit, the girders that supported the hull structure began to buckle, collapsing the entire structure amidships and breaking the hull in half. The center third of the ship quickly sank but the bow and stern remained afloat for some time before flooding caused them both to point upward as they filled with water. During the chaos of battle, it had not been known that Helena was hit and sinking by the other ships in her task force. At 02:30 it was quickly realized that Helena was not responding to radio messages and ships began to search for the missing cruiser. At 03:13, Radford's radar picked up a contact some 5,000 yards away, and confirmed it was Helena's bow pointing up out of the water. Nearly a thousand men were in the water, clinging to life rafts and waiting to be picked up by the destroyers, which reached the men at 03:41. In the course of the night's operations, Nicholas had picked up 291 while Radford had rescued 444.

A significant number of men were still in the water; some life rafts remained in the area, while a number of men had climbed onto the still floating bow or clung to pieces of floating wreckage. Other groups of men were pulled there by the current; as the men reached the coral reef that surrounded the island on 8 July, they were met by locals who helped pull the men to shore and put them in contact with the coastwatcher station. Out of a crew of almost 1,200; 168 men were killed, either during the battle or while the men were adrift.

USS Atlanta (CL-51) was sailing as a part of TF 67 on 12 November 1942 with four additional cruisers and eight destroyers to meet an incoming Japanese surface force consisting of two battleships and eleven destroyers intending on bombarding Henderson Field. In total darkness; the two task forces streamed towards on another until at 01:48, Atlanta was illuminated by searchlights from Japanese battleship Hiei which was only 3,000 yards away, practically point-blank range for the battleship.

The two sides began to open fire on one another and the battle quickly turned into a chaotic and confused close-range melee in the pitch-black dark. During the wild fight, Atlanta, being exposed as the lead cruiser in the US formation was hit by several shells and took a torpedo hit to her port engine room, killing almost all power to the ship and leaving her guns inoperable. Right after being torpedoed, Atlanta drifted into the line of fire of San Francisco and took at least nineteen eight-inch shells from the friendly ship, killing Admiral Norman Scott and most of the bridge staff. Captain Jenkins survived the slaughter on the bridge and ordered the crew to begin clearing debris, jettisoning topside weight to correct the list, reducing the volume of sea water in the ship, and tending the wounded.

As day broke, Atlanta was still without power and drifting about in the sound. She was taken under tow by a tugboat but by 14:00, Captain Jenkins decided the ship was beyond saving and ordered the abandonment of Atlanta. The ship was sunk by demolition charges by her own crew, going down at 20:15 on 13 November 1942. She lies in 400 ft of water, 3 miles west of Lunga Point.

USS Juneau (CL-52) was engaged in the Naval Battle of Guadalcanal on 13 November 1942, firing on an enemy destroyer when she was hit by a torpedo on her port side from the Japanese destroyer Amatsukaze which cut her speed to 13 knots, broke her keel, destroyed her fire control system, and disabled all electrical power and guns. Juneau withdrew from the action, and after the melee was over proceeded to Espiritu Santo with other ships damaged in the night's action. She was steaming 800 yards off the starboard quarter of San Francisco, down by the bow and making a steady 13 kn when she was spotted by Japanese submarine I-26. At 11:00, three torpedoes were fired at San Francisco but missed and hit Juneau. One of the torpedoes stuck in the same spot Juneau had been hit by Amatsukaze earlier, setting off an enormous explosion that engulfed the entire ship, breaking her into two halves. She was gone in less than thirty seconds.

Owing to the massive explosion and quick sinking, it was assumed by the task force commander that nobody could have survived Juneau's destruction, and fearing more submarine attacks on his damaged force; he made the decision to not stop and pick up survivors. But over 100 of Juneau's crew had survived the sinking, and were left stranded in shark-infested waters for over eight days before only 10 men were finally rescued. In total 687 of Juneau's crew died as a result of her sinking; including all five Sullivan brothers.

USS Columbia (CL-56) was struck by a kamikaze "Val" on 1 January 1945 while operating in Lingayen Gulf. The plane hit the ship's aft quarter, and penetrated two decks before its bomb exploded, killing 13 and wounding 44, and knocking out her rear turrets. Prompt and effective damage control prevented the fires from spreading and causing more explosions, allowing Columbia to remain on station.

On 9 January 1945, she was hit again by a kamikaze "Tojo" fighter which crashed into the forward gun director gun mount, killing 24 and wounding 97 men. Again, Columbia's damage control teams jumped into action and kept the ship in action, able to resume her fire support despite the damage. Columbia would be awarded ten battle stars for her service in WWII.

USS Denver (CL-58) Fought in the battle of Empress Augusta bay, 1 November 1943, when the Japanese heavy cruisers Myōkō and Haguro fired three salvos at 22,000 yards. Denver was holed three times below the waterline by their 8-inch (203 mm) guns and forced to fall out of formation. Denver was operating in support of landings at Cape Torokina on 13 November 1943 when at 04:55 she was hit by an air-dropped torpedo in her starboard side. Twenty men were killed by the blast which knocked out all power and the ship took on a list. She was towed away to make temporary repairs. The ship would return to service in June 1944, awarded eleven battle stars for her service in WWII, and finally scrapped in 1960.

USS Birmingham (CL-62) was operating off Bougainville Island on 8 November 1943 when her task force came under air attack by Japanese planes. She was hit by two bombs and a torpedo which blew a 30-foot hole into her port side, although she managed to shoot down all of her attackers. Two men were killed and 34 wounded.

On 24 October 1944, while sailing with TF 38, Birmingham came to the assistance of the stricken carrier Princeton, coming alongside to help fight fires, when at 15:24, a magazine detonated on board Princeton causing extensive damage to Birmingham's superstructure. On board Birmingham 239 men were killed and 408 wounded during the attempt to save the carrier. Birmingham had to put in for repairs which were completed by Jan 1945. While operating off Okinawa on 4 May 1945, Birmingham was hit by an "Oscar" from directly overhead which crashed through her main forward deck, its bomb exploding in the sick bay, killing everyone there. 51 were killed and 81 were wounded. The ship would finish WWII with nine battle stars. She was scrapped in 1959.

USS Biloxi (CL-80) was hit by a burning "Val" kamikaze dive bomber which crashed amidships at her port water line. The damage was minor and luckily the plane's bomb was a dud, but two men were injured in the attack.

USS Houston (CL-81) was operating with TF 38 which was conducting air strikes on Formosa when on 14 October 1944 the task force was attacked by Japanese planes. Houston was targeted by four torpedo bombers, three of which were shot down but one managed to score a hit on the cruiser in the engine room, knocking out propulsive power to the ship. Houston was towed away from the battle area along with the cruiser Canberra. They came under a second torpedo bomber attack on the 16 Oct while still under tow. One of the enemy bombers hit Houston directly on the stern, causing flooding in the ship's scout plane hangar. Despite this, the ship was able to remain afloat with excellent damage control and returned to the States for repairs. Houston would receive three battle stars for her service in WWII and was scrapped in 1959.

USS Reno (CL-96) was sailing with TF 38 east of the San Bernardino Strait on the night of 3 November 1944 when she was targeted by Japanese submarine I-41. Reno was hit on her port side by two torpedoes, one of which was a dud. The other warhead detonated four decks below topside, killing 46 men and wounding several others. The ship lost all power and had to be towed over 1,500 miles to Ulithi where she received sufficient repairs to power herself home. She earned three battle stars for her WWII service.

== Destroyer (DD) ==
=== Wickes class ===
USS Little (DD-79) was acting as a high-speed transport ferrying vital supplies and reinforcements to Guadalcanal when at 01:00 on 5 September 1942, Little and her sister ship Gregory encountered the Japanese destroyers Yūdachi, Hatsuyuki, and Murakumo of the "Tokyo Express". Although outnumbered and outgunned, the small old ship opened fire on the enemy ships until hit by a barrage of shells which set Little ablaze, and caused her to quickly sink. Many of Little's crew were strafed in the water. Sixty-one crewmen were lost with the Little.

USS Gregory (DD-82) was acting as a high-speed transport ferrying supplies to Guadalcanal along with her sister ship Little when at 01:00 on 5 September 1942, the two ships encountered Yūdachi, Hatsuyuki, and Murakumo. At the outset of the engagement, a friendly Navy plane dropped flares that illuminated the two American ships in the black darkness for the Japanese to clearly see. Both American ships were on fire and sinking within a few minutes. The Japanese ships continued to fire upon men in the water, many of whom would spend several days in shark-infested waters before rescue. Eleven of Gregory's crew were killed.

USS Colhoun (DD-85) was acting as a high-speed transport ferrying vital supplies to Guadalcanal when on 30 Aug 1942 while unloading cargo near Kukum Point she was attacked by Japanese dive bombers. The enemy planes were obscured by cloud cover and managed to score numerous hits along the length of the ship. Colhoun was abandoned and sank taking the lives of fifty-one men. Eighteen men were wounded in the attack.

USS McKean (DD-90) was acting as a high-speed transport ferrying Marine reinforcements to Guadalcanal when on 17 November 1942 while approaching Empress Augusta Bay, she was attacked by a Japanese G4M "Betty" torpedo bomber. At 03:50 the enemy plane's torpedo hit the ship's starboard side, detonating the aft magazine and rupturing fuel oil tanks. McKean was engulfed in raging fire aft of the first smoke stack and sinking by the stern when order to abandon was given at 03:55. The ship went down by 04:18 after several more explosions, taking sixty-four of her crew and fifty-two Marines with her.

USS Rathburne (DD-113) was operating off Okinawa on 27 April 1945 when at 22:00 a lone kamikaze targeted the Rathburne. Despite the ship's anti-aircraft fire and evasive maneuvering the plane hit the port side on the water line starting fires and flooding several compartments. Luckily none of Rathburne's crew was hurt in the attack. Damage control was able to save the ship. She would be scrapped after the war.

USS Ward (DD-139) was acting as a high speed transport conducting operations off Leyte when on 7 December 1944, Ward was attacked by a kamikaze G4M "Betty" which crashed amidships knocking out power and starting blazing fires. The crew was unable to contain the fires and abandoned ship. Ward would be sunk by gunfire from escorting destroyers three years to the day after firing America's first shot in anger of WWII.

USS Dickerson (DD-157) was conducting escort duty off Okinawa on the night of 2 April 1945 when her group of transports were attacked by a large force of kamikazes. One suicide plane approached in a low glide before striking the base of the bridge and igniting intense fires. Nearly at the same moment; another plane struck the ship's forecastle, tearing a huge hole across the deck. Despite the valiant efforts of her crew, the ship was abandoned with a loss of fifty-four men killed. Dickerson's hulk was towed to a nearby base where after a brief salvage and recovery of the dead it was later sunk.

USS Leary (DD-158) was part of a sub hunting task force when during a storm on 24 December 1943 at 01:58 she was hit by a torpedo from U-275 on the starboard side. The explosion killed every man in the after engine room and was unable to move in the rough seas. As the ship was being abandoned, Leary was hit by two additional torpedoes which quickly put the ship beneath the waves. Ninety-eight of her crew were lost with the Leary.

USS Palmer (DD-161) was conducting minesweeping operations off Lingayen Gulf when on 7 January 1945 around 15:45, she stuck a mine that knocked out a turbine and she left her formation to make repairs. While making repairs; at 18:40 an enemy twin engine bomber dropped two bombs that scored a hit on Palmer's portside. The ship became engulfed in billowing flames within a few minutes, prompting the crew to abandon ship. Palmer sank within six minutes of the mine explosion, taking twenty-eight men with her and leaving thirty-eight wounded.

=== Clemson class ===
USS Southard (DD-207) was conducting minesweeping operations in Lingayen Gulf on 6 January 1945 when she was attacked by kamikazes in the afternoon. A suicide plane crashed into her stacks; wounding six men, and ricocheted off into the seas causing minor damage. The ship was repaired and continued operating the next day.

USS Hovey (DD-208) was sailing with a minesweeper group on 7 January 1945 in Lingayen Gulf when the US ships were attacked by kamikazes. One plane flying low on the water dropped its torpedo and slammed into the ship's starboard quarter after being set ablaze. The instant the plane hit, the plane's torpedo struck the ship on the starboard side knocking out all power. The crew abandoned the ship which later broke in two halves. 48 men were killed, 24 of the dead were survivors from other destroyers sunk in the previous days.

USS Long (DD-209) was conducting minesweeping operations in Lingayen Gulf on 6 January 1945 when a "Zero" kamikaze crashed into get portside, below the bridge about 1 ft above the water line. The crew feared the magazine would explode and abandoned ship. It would be struck by another kamikaze later that day, in the same spot the first plane had hit. The resulting explosion broke Long in half. One of her men died and 35 were wounded.

USS Borie (DD-215) was hunting German U-boat "U‐405" on 1 November 1943 when the submarine surfaced and the vessels engaged each other with gunfire. Borie rammed the U-boat but a wave lifted the ship's bow on top of the submarine. The two ships struggled to break free from each other while exchanging small arms fire, but the Borie took major damage to her hull, flooding her forward engine room.

USS Edsall (DD-219) was responding to distress calls from USS Pecos near Java on 1 Mar 1942 when she stumbled upon Kido Butai; Japan's fast carrier force escorted by two battleships. The battleships Hiei and Kirishima and the heavy cruisers Tone and Chikuma took Edsall undefire at 27,000 yards, which expended her torpedoes and began to maneuver and turn to avoid the Japanese fire, severely hindered by the extreme range. However, a wave of bombers from the aircraft carrier Sōryū crippled Edsall with a direct bomb hit, and the four surface vessels finished her off.

USS Stewart (DD-224) was en route to Bali on 19 February 1942, leading a column of Allied ships when they were engaged the Japanese destroyers Asashio and Ōshio in the Battle of Badung Strait and crippled by multiple 5-inch (127 mm) shell hits. The ship made it to a floating drydock at Surabaya but was abandoned by her crew and left behind after the ship fell over off its keel blocks into 12 feet of water. Surabaya would fall to the Japanese, who would raise the Stewart and commission the ship into the IJN. The ship would survive the war to be returned to the US Navy, and later sunk as a target.

USS Pope (DD-225) was escorting the severely damaged British cruiser Exeter on 1 March 1942, when a Japanese task force of heavy cruisers broke up the rescue effort. Pope sought refuge in a rain squall but was soon spotted bya wave of six aircraft from the light carrier Ryūjō. A near-miss by dive bombers caused flooding which prompted the crew to abandon ship just as the heavy cruisers Myōkō and Ashigara closed for the kill. Most of Pope's crew would endure more than 60 hours in open sea before being rescued by the destroyer Ikazuchi, spending years in POW camps.

USS Peary (DD-226) was moored at Cavite, Philippines, when she was struck on her superstructure by a high-level bomber which killed 8 men on 10 December 1941. On 19 February 1942, Peary was attacked by dive bombers during the Bombing of Darwin. She was hit five times by bombs that detonated her magazines, started flooding and caused her to sink. 88 of her crew went down with her.

USS Pillsbury (DD-227) was attempting to rendezvous with friendly forces near Java on 2 Mar 1942 when at she was engaged in a night action with the Japanese heavy cruisers Takao and Atago. The ship was sunk with all hands; 116 men were lost.

USS Truxtun (DD-229) was acting as escort on 18 Feb 1942 off St. Lawrence, Newfoundland when at 04:10 she ran aground amid a storm and immediately broke in half. The extremely violent and freezing seas took the lives of 110 of her crew, 46 were rescued.

USS Brooks (DD-232) was hit by a kamikaze on 6 January 1945 in Lingayen Gulf, which struck her port side, starting fires and causing flooding. 3 men were killed and 11 were wounded. The ship was towed back to the states and decommissioned.

USS Gilmer (DD-233) was operating off Okinawa on 26 March 1945 when the ship was hit by a kamikaze in her galley deckhouse which killed 1 man and wounded 3 more. The ship made temporary repairs and remained on station until 9 April 1945. Gilmer would resume her duties by early July.

USS McFarland (DD-237) was operating near Guadalcanal as a tender and transport when on 19 Oct 1942 she was attacked by 9 dive bombers. The ship took a direct hit on her stern, disabling the ship's steering, and killed 11 men. Another 12 were wounded. The ship's crew made temporary repairs while moored at Florida Island and proceeded to Espiritu Santo, and finally back to Pearl Harbor by 29 December 1942.

USS Sturtevant (DD-240) was escorting a convoy off Key West, Florida, on 26 April 1942, when the ship unknowingly sailed into an American minefield. The ship struck several mines within minutes and broke into three sections. 15 of her crew were killed in the sinking.

USS Reuben James (DD-245) was acting as escort for British convoys as a part of the Neutrality Patrol when on 23 October 1941 around daybreak the ship was hit by a torpedo fired from U-552, which was aiming for a cargo vessel. The torpedo hit the ship's bow, causing a magazine explosion that blew off the bow away from the ship. The aft section of the ship sank five minutes later, taking 100 men down with her; 44 were rescued from the sea.

USS Barry (DD-248) was on patrol off Okinawa on 25 May when she was attacked by two kamikazes off Okinawa. One attacker was shot down, but the second plowed into the ship below the bridge. 28 men were wounded. The ship was abandoned but did not sink. A skeleton crew determined the damage was too extensive to repair the ship, so all useful equipment was removed and Barry was towed to be used as a decoy. The Japanese took the bait and sank the ship along with its escort (LSM-59) on 21 June 1945.

USS Belknap (DD-251) was covering the landings at Lingayen Gulf and Luzon when on 11 January 1945 she was attacked by a kamikaze which struck the ship in the number two stack. The explosion killed 38 men and wounded 49; including members of the Navy's UDTs, and knocked out the ship's engines. The ship was towed to the Admiralty Islands and made enough repairs to sail to the west coast.

USS Dale (DD-290) was supporting operations in Buna as a high speed transport named SS Masaya when on 28 March 1943 she was attacked by five dive bombers, 6 miles off Oro Bay. Dale was hit at least three times and sank at 13:13. 11 of her crew were killed and 4 others wounded.

USS Zane (DD-337) was acting as a high speed transport ferrying supplies to Guadalcanal when on 25 October 1942; Zane and her fellow ship USS Trever were engaged by the Japanese destroyers Akatsuki, Ikazuchi, and Shiratsuyu in Ironbottom Sound in a running battle as Zane and Trever attempted to flee. Zane took a direct hit on the ship's forward battery, killing 3 men, but maintained course until the Japanese ships gave up the chase after an hour. Zane was repaired and continued her service until scrapping after the war.

USS Perry (DD-340) was conducting minesweeping operations off near Anguar on 13 September when the ship struck a second mine in the last 30 hours. However, unlike the first time, the ship was severely damaged. Her engines lost all steam, and a significant list prompted the order to abandon ship only two minutes after the explosion. Perry broke in half and sank, but fortunately none of her crew was lost.

USS William B. Preston (DD-344) was anchored off Darwin, Australia on 19 Feb 1942 when over 240 Japanese aircraft bombed the area in a massive air strike. While attempting to make open sea; William B Preston was struck by a bomb aft near the deckhouse near the living area disabling steering. The ship was able to use its engines to steer itself away from the destruction that wrecked Darwin. 11 of her crew were killed during the engagement. William B Preston would finish the war as a tender and occasional transport.

=== Farragut class ===
USS Hull (DD-350) was supporting the Mindoro landings when on 18 December 1944, her fleet was hit by a hurricane type storm dubbed Typhoon Cobra. Despite the best efforts of her crew, the Hull was not prepared handle the intensity of the storm and after several minutes she rolled onto her side and did not return, being swallowed by the heavy sea. 62 of the ship's crew were rescued, unfortunately, 202 were lost with the ship.

USS Worden (DD-352) was participating in the [landings at Amchitka] when she was caught in a strong current which pushed the ship into shape edged rocks, which opened her hull and knocked out all power. An attempt to tow the ship failed in the rough seas and the Worden began to break-up, prompting the crew to abandon ship. 13 of her crew would drown in the wintry sea.

USS Monaghan (DD-354) was supporting the Mindoro landings when on 18 December 1944 her fleet was hit by Typhoon Cobra. The ship had been waiting to refuel and was not prepared to ride out the storm. The ship rolled back and forth in the intense heavy seas until a huge wall of water hammered the vessel, capsizing over to starboard. All except for 6 of Monaghan's crew perished in the sinking, the survivors clinging to rafts for several days, 256 of her men were gone.

=== Porter class ===
USS Porter (DD-356) was sailing as a part of TF16 during the Battle of Santa Cruz on 26 October 1942. During the action, she attempted to come to the aid of a downed TBF Avenger which had crashed nearby after being shot down by fighters from the Japanese light carrier Zuihō, when she was struck amidships in the forward engine room by a torpedo, most likely from the downed Avenger. 15 men were killed and 5 other men were wounded. After all the survivors were picked up the Porter was scuttled by USS Shaw.

USS Selfridge (DD-357) was attempting to intercept Japanese destroyer transports that were evacuating troops from Vella Lavella. The two task groups engaged each other at 23:00 on 6 October 1943 with gunfire and torpedoes. Selfridge attacked the enemy ships on her own after the O'Bannon and the Chevalier collided during the engagement. A torpedo struck Selfridge on her bow, nearly severing the hull of the ship forward of the bridge. 49 of Selfridge's crew were lost and 11 more men were wounded. The ship would have its bow replaced and she would return to action by May 1944.

=== Mahan class ===
USS Mahan (DD-364) was covering landings near Ormoc Bay on Leyte's west side on 7 December 1944 when a group of Japanese kamikazes attacked. Although several of the enemy planes were downed, three planes managed to strike the Mahan. Two planes hit the ship's waterline on both sides of the ship near the Number Two 5-inch gun. A third plane crashed just aft of the bridge. Despite valiant efforts of her crew to save the ship, the fires were out of control and ignited the forward magazine. After the survivors were taken off, Mahan was scuttled with torpedoes; the crew lost 6 men and 31 wounded.

USS Drayton (DD-366) was operating in the Philippines near San Pedro Bay when on 7 December 1944 she was attacked by strafing Japanese planes. One of these planes, a "Val", made a suicide run that struck the Drayton's No. One five-inch gun. Six men were killed and another 12 of her crew were wounded in the attack, but Drayton was able to complete her escort mission and return to New Guinea for repairs.

USS Lamson (DD-367) was operating picket duty near Ormoc Bay on 7 December 1944 when she was approached by a low-flying kamikaze off her starboard quarter. The ship was unable to train its main guns onto the target, and the plane crashed into the ship, starting a huge fire. The fires were deemed to be out of control and the crew abandoned ship. However, firefighting continued by nearby rescue tug ATR-31 and eventually all fires were extinguished. The ship was towed to San Pedro and would be repaired. Four of her men were killed and 17 wounded.

USS Reid (DD-369) was escorting ammunition resupply convoys headed for Ormoc Bay on 11 December 1944 when at 1700, as many as 12 Japanese aircraft targeted Reid for destruction. In less than a minute, Reid shot down three planes but was struck by four kamikaze's one after another on her port side in several locations. The last plane to hit set off the ship's aft magazines which tore the Reid apart. The ship rolled to starboard and sank at 1702, taking 103 of her crew with her.

USS Cassin (DD-372) was in drydock on keel blocks in Pearl Harbor when on the morning of 7 December 1941 the base was attacked by a huge Japanese airstrike. A bomb had struck the Downes which was alongside the Cassin in drydock and started uncontrollable fires. The inferno spread to Cassin and the ship slipped from its keel blocks and rested against Downes. Both ships had their equipment salvaged and installed on all new ships rebuilt with their hull numbers. The Cassin would return to service by April 1944.

USS Shaw (DD-373) was in floating drydock at Pearl Harbor when on the morning of 7 December 1941 the base was attacked by a huge Japanese airstrike. The Shaw was singled out by dive bombers during the second wave and hit with three bombs on the forward part of the ship. Firefighting was abandoned at 0925 and five minutes later the forward magazines exploded, wrecking the bow of the ship. Shaw would be repaired, her bow rebuilt and amazingly would return to service by August 1942 to an illustrious career.

USS Tucker (DD-374) was escorting a cargo ship into Espiritu Santo on 4 August 1942 when as she was heading in through the western entrance, the ship struck a friendly mine. The explosion killed three of her crew, and broke the ship in half. Most of the crew was rescued and the two halves of the ship sank separately. It would later be determined Tucker's captain had not been notified there would be mines in his ship's path.

USS Downes (DD-375) was in drydock next to Cassin at Pearl Harbor on the morning of 7 December 1941 when the base was attacked by a huge Japanese airstrike. During the second wave of the attack, a dive bomber hit Downes with a 250 kg bomb which ruptured the ship's fuel tanks and started a raging fire. The drydock was flooded to prevent the fires from spreading but Cassin fell off her keel blocks and rested against Downes. Both ships had their salvageable equipment removed and installed on brand new hulls. Downes would return to service by March 1943.

USS Cushing (DD-376) was sailing with TF 64 en route to intercept a Japanese fleet making for the marine held airbase on Guadalcanal on the night of 13 November 1942. The two fleets met in pitch-black darkness at 0145 and a wild close range gun fight erupted. Cushing was engaged by the light cruiser Nagara and the destroyers Yukikaze and Harusame at ranges closer than 3,000 yards. The ship was hit numerous hits in rapid succession and lost power through the fight. The ship continued to fight as best it could and launched several torpedoes at a nearby enemy battleship as the crew attempted damage control, but some ten 3.9-inch (10 cm) shell hits from the destroyer Teruzuki destroyed any chance at saving the ship, what few it had in the first place. Fires, loss of power, and exploding ammunition prompted the order to abandon ship at 0230. The ship's burning hulk stayed afloat until 1700 that afternoon before it finally sank. 70 men of Cushing's crew were lost.

USS Perkins (DD-377) had been operating as part of the New Guinea campaign in the fall of 1943 when on 28 November 1943 she sailed from Milne Bay for Buna. At 0200 on the 29th, she was accidentally rammed by Australian troopship Dundroon amidships on her portside. The ship split in half and sank 2 miles off Ipoteto Island; nine of her men were killed, another man seriously wounded. Her commanding officers were found to be at fault for the accident.

USS Smith (DD-378) was escorting aircraft carrier USS Enterprise (CV-6) during the Battle of Santa Cruz when a damaged B5N "Kate" torpedo bomber made a suicide dive on the small destroyer. The plane smashed into the ship's forecastle with a large explosion; its torpedo detonated a few minutes later, causing more casualties. Despite the billowing flames, the ship's crew was able to put out the fires (with help from the wake of USS South Dakota) by late afternoon, and all guns remained operational. Fifty-seven of her crew were killed, and 12 more wounded. Smith would be repaired and returned to service in February 1943.

USS Preston (DD-379) was sailing with TF 64 on 14 November 1942 en route to intercept a Japanese fleet making for the Marine-held airbase on Guadalcanal. The two fleets engaged each other around 23:15. During the battle, several of the American destroyers bunched together, making easier targets for the Japanese. Preston was hit by numerous heavy shells from Nagara that knocked out her firerooms and started large fires which better illuminated Preston for her enemies to see. The ship rapidly took hits from all sides, and by 12:36 she was ordered abandoned. The ship rolled over and sank ten minutes later, taking 116 crew with her.

=== Somers class ===
USS Warrington (DD-383) was sailing from Norfolk to Trinidad Island when on 12 September 1944; the crew was warned that they were sailing straight towards a massive hurricane. The ship made it through the night, but by early morning the storm grew in intensity, and began to severely hamper the Warrington. Water rushed through the ship's vents and knocked out all power. Warrington's crew tried desperately to save their ship but it was apparent the Warrington was taking too much water and would have to be abandoned. The ship sank at 12:50 leaving her crew stranded in the fierce storm. After several days of searching, only 73 of the ship's 321 crew were rescued.

=== Bagley class ===
USS Blue (DD-387) was patrolling Ironbottom Sound on the night of 22 Aug 1942 when she picked up the Japanese destroyer Kawakaze on her radar. At that moment a torpedo struck the Blue on her stern nearly blowing it off completely. 9 men were killed and 21 wounded. Over the next 24 hours, attempts were made to tow the ship but after these efforts failed she was scuttled.

USS Mugford (DD-389) was covering the 7 Aug 1942 landings on Guadalcanal when at 1320, a large Japanese airstrike attempted to disrupt the landings. Mugford was targeted by several dive bombers who managed to land a 250 kg bomb on the stern of the destroyer causing minimal damage. 18 men were killed and another 17 wounded. The ship would remain on station through September 1942.

While patrolling the Surigao Strait on the afternoon of 5 December 1944, a lone "Val" kamikaze managed to slip past her antiaircraft fire and struck the Mugford on her portside. 8 men were killed and 16 wounded. The ship temporarily lost power and had to be towed away until she was able to extinguish fires and proceed under her own power back to the states for repairs. The ship returned to service in March 1945.

USS Ralph Talbot (DD-390) was on patrol off Savo Island during the night of 7-8 Aug 1942 when at 0215 a Japanese heavy cruiser appeared out of the darkness. The two ships exchanged fire; Ralph Talbot was hit four times which killed 12 men and wounded several more. Ralph Talbot limped away with her bridge on fire and listing heavily to starboard. The crew was able to save their ship and sufficiently patch up to make for major repairs stateside. By January 1943 she was back fighting the war.

On the evening of 27 April, Ralph Talbot was screening off Hagushi when two kamikazes attacked her at 2040. One struck her starboard side aft and the other crashed close aboard. The ship began to flood, but was quickly brought under control and the ship headed to Kerama Retto for repairs. Her casualties were 5 dead and 9 wounded.

USS Henley (DD-391) was conducting an offensive sweep off "Finshafen" with two other destroyers on 3 October 1943 when her captain ordered evasive maneuvers to avoid two torpedoes fired from the submarine Ro-108 headed for the ship. Henley dodged the first two warheads, but a third torpedo struck the ship on her portside; exploded in her boiler rooms, and broke her keel which nearly halved the ship in two. The crew abandoned their destroyer and were rescued by her fellow tin cans. 15 men went down with Henley.

USS Patterson (DD-392) was patrolling with two heavy cruisers south of Savo Island on 9 Aug 1942 when at 0145 she ran head-on into a Japanese task force of 5 heavy cruisers, 2 light cruisers, and a destroyer. After sending by radio and signal lamp: "Warning! Warning! Strange ships entering the harbor!" Patterson fired star shells and engaged the enemy warships, but was quickly hit by five 5.5-inch (14 cm) shells from the light cruiser Yūbari that knocked out No.4 gun and damaged No.3 gun. 10 men were killed and 8 were wounded. The ship made repairs and remained in action.

On 30 September 1943 while engaging Japanese barges in New Georgia Sound ("The Slot"), a damaged friendly destroyer attempting to rejoin the formation collided with Patterson, nearly breaking off the ship's bow forward of the No.1 gun, which eventually did separate. Three men were killed and 10 were wounded in the accident. The ship had to have a false bow installed for its trip stateside for repairs. The Patterson rejoined the war in March 1944.

USS Jarvis (DD-393) was defending the Guadalcanal landings on 8 Aug 1942 when 26 Japanese bombers attacked at 1200. Jarvis maneuvered between the enemy planes and the cruiser USS Vincennes when she was struck by an aerial torpedo on her starboard side which knocked out all power and killed 14 of her crew and wounded 7. The ship made sufficient repairs to make for Sydney, Australia during the night to have immediate work done on her 50-foot gash in her side. Her wounded were transferred off at Tulagi before she left.

While leaving the Guadalcanal area on 9 August 1942, at 0130 she steamed right past a Japanese task force on their way to meet the Americans near Savo Island. It is unclear if Jarvis crew were aware of the enemy ships, but the Japanese considered an escaping cruiser. The next day while the Jarvis was slowly steaming towards Australia down by the bow, with no radio and few working guns; she was pounced on by 31 Japanese planes. The Japanese recorded that Jarvis "split and sank" at 1300 on 9 August 1942. Of her 223 crew remaining on board, not a single man survived.

=== Benham class ===
USS Benham (DD-397) was operating with TF 64 on the night of 14–15 November 1942 near Guadalcanal; on course to intercept a Japanese task force headed to bombard Henderson Field. The two sides engaged in combat just before midnight. At 0038, Benham took a torpedo hit off her bow, possibly from the Japanese destroyer Shirayuki. The blast carried away the bow of the ship forward of the bridge causing Benham to retreat from the battle. Although she suffered no casualties during the fight, the ship was severely damaged and the crew gave up efforts to save her. Benham would be scuttled by USS Gwin (DD-433).

USS Mayrant (DD-402) was conducting anti-aircraft duties off Palermo, Italy on 26 May 1943 when she was attacked by German dive bombers. A near-miss landed just a yard off the port bow which ruptured the hull and flooded the engineering space of the ship. 5 men were killed and another 18 wounded. Despite the serious damage to the ship, her crew was able to save the Mayrant and make it back to a safe port. The ship would return to service in May 1944.

USS Rowan (DD-405) was assisting the landings in the Gulf of Salerno on 10 September 1942 when her convoy of ships was attacked by German E-boats shortly after midnight. As Rowan turned to have all her guns engage the enemy, she was struck by a torpedo. Rowan sank in less than a minute, taking 202 of her crew down with her. 71 of her men were rescued.

USS Sterett (DD-407) was operating with TF 67 on the night of 13 November 1942, which was heading to meet a Japanese surface task force head-on just off Guadalcanal. The two sides met with one another in the pitch-black night at 0130 and quickly the battle became a frenzied shootout. Sterett was hit four times by Japanese battleship Hiei, which knocked out her rudder. Despite this, the crew maintained fire on the enemy ships, helping to sink the Japanese destroyer Yūdachi. However, Sterett herself was ambushed by the Japanese destroyer Yukikaze and hit by eleven 5-inch (127 mm) shells, destroying her forward guns and torpedo tubes and setting the ship on fire. 28 of her crew were killed in the battle, and another 13 seriously wounded. Sterett remained afloat and was able to depart the battle area for emergency repairs. She would rejoin the war on 10 February 1943.

On 9 April 1945 while on picket duty off Okinawa, Sterett was attacked by five kamikazes. The crew shot down the first three, but the fourth plane to come in struck the starboard waterline. All power was lost, steering was knocked out and her main guns frozen in place. Two of her men were wounded, but the veteran crew was able to quickly restore power and got the ship underway again to for repairs.

USS Wilson (DD-408) was on patrol off Kerama Retto on 16 April 1945 when she observed two Japanese aircraft and took them under fire. One made a run on her and was shot down 75 yards to starboard, ricocheted off the water and hit Wilson in her 40 mm gun tub. It then spun across the deck and landed in the water on the portside. Its 220-lb bomb penetrated the ship, but only the booster charge went off, causing slight damage. It was removed intact from the ship a couple of days later. Wilson had five dead and three wounded in the attack, but the damage was minimal. She was repaired and back in action within a few days.

=== Sims class ===
USS Sims (DD-409) was escorting the fleet oiler USS Neosho during the Battle of Coral Sea on 7 May 1942 when the two ships were sighted by a Japanese search plane. The pilot identified the destroyer and oiler as a cruiser and carrier, respectively.

A large group of Japanese bombers from the aircraft carriers Shōkaku and Zuikaku soon appeared at 09:30 and circled the two American ships searching for the reported carrier but settled on the Sims and Neosho when their fuel ran low. The Sims was hit by three 250 kg bombs, two of which exploded in the engine room. In minutes the ship buckled amidships and began to sink stern first. As she went down, Sims exploded, killing many of her men in the water. Of a crew of 192, only 16 men were rescued.

USS Hughes (DD-410) was operating off the southern tip of Leyte on 10 December 1944, when she was attacked by a G4M "Betty" kamikaze which crashed into the ship causing severe damage. The ship's engine room and much of her machinery was demolished. Hughes crew suffered 2 men killed and 21 wounded. She was towed to San Pedro Bay where temporary repairs enabled her to travel stateside. After extensive repairs, Hughes rejoined the war on 4 June 1945.

USS Anderson (DD-411) was participating in a diversionary bombardment of Wotje during the Marshall Islands campaign on 30 January 1944 when during the bombardment the ship was hit by a shell fired from a shore battery. The shell hit the Combat Information Center on board; killing six and wounding 14 others. The damage was minimal and Anderson remained on station.

On 1 November 1944 while on patrol near Panaon Island, Anderson was attacked by a Ki-43 "Oscar" which dove at her at 1812. Despite being hit by 20mm and 40mm shells, the plane got through, caught its right wing tip on the ship's stack and hit the ship's portside. Burning gasoline covered the deck area of the crash and the boilers were put out of commission by the impact. The fires were out by 1855; afterwards Anderson counted 16 dead and 20 wounded.

USS Hammann (DD-412) was assisting in the effort to save the crippled aircraft carrier USS Yorktown on 6 June 1942. Hammann was alongside the stricken carrier transferring damage control parties when after 1200, Japanese submarine I-168 successfully penetrated the screen of protecting destroyers and fired a spread of four torpedoes. One of the torpedoes hit Hammann amidships, breaking her in half. The ship's two halves sank; bow first, within four minutes. After the stern went under, Hammann's depth charges exploded in a violent underwater explosion, killing many more men in the water. 80 of her crew went down with the Hammann.

USS O'Brien (DD-415) was escorting a convoy of troop transports in company with USS Wasp (CV-7) on 15 September 1942 when the American ships were targeted by Japanese submarine I-19. A spread of six torpedoes was fired which sank the Wasp, and damaged battleship North Carolina. O'Brien evaded one torpedo and was then struck by a second on her port bow. Damage at first did not seem significant and the ship made full power. However, the damage to the ship would haunt the crew despite the repairs they attempted to make at Espiritu Santo.

The ship departed for San Francisco for more extensive repairs on 10 October. As she made headway the ship gradually leaked more water. By 18 October, the crew started jettisoning topside weight to attempt to save the ship, but it became clear the O'Brien would have to make the nearest port. At 0600 on 19 October, the ship started to come apart prompting the crew to abandon ship except for a small salvage team, who also left the ship 30 minutes later. By 0800 O'Brien slipped beneath the sea after traveling 3,000 miles with torpedo damage, fortunately, none of her crew were lost.

USS Walke (DD-416) was sailing with TF 64 on the night of 14–15 November 1942 when around 2330 the American ships engaged a Japanese task force south of Savo Island. Walke was engaging Japanese ships with her main battery when at 0039 the ship was shaken by a tremendous explosion from a torpedo fired from the Japanese destroyer Samidare on her starboard side. The crew was ordered to abandon the fast-sinking ship. Walke's stern was the last part of the ship to sink underwater; as it did several depth charges exploded, killing and wounding several men left in the water. After two encounters with enemy vessels who luckily left without firing, 151 survivors were rescued in the morning by USS Meade (DD-602). Seventy-two men went down with the Walke in her final battle, and 6 more survivors died of their wounds.

USS Morris (DD-417) was operating off Okinawa and Kerama Retto on 6 April 1945 when at 1811 she was targeted by a B5N "Kate" kamikaze. Despite taking several hits, the flaming plane continued on to crash into the ship on the portside between the No.1 and No.2 five-inch guns. Fires quickly spread and it took over two hours to extinguish them. The Morris suffered 13 dead, 45 wounded. The ship's steering was damaged and her bow was demolished, but temporary repairs allowed the Morris to cross the Pacific to San Francisco. The ship was declared neither seaworthy or habitable and was not repaired.

USS Buck (DD-420) was on patrol off Salerno on the night of 9 October 1943 when just after midnight; German submarine U-616 ambushed the destroyer with possibly two torpedo strikes on her forward starboard side. The Buck flooded quickly and sank within four minutes. As the ship sank, her depth charges which had been set to safety detonated causing a severe underwater explosion that killed and wounded many sailors in the water. 95 men were killed when Buck sank.

=== Benson class ===
USS Mayo (DD-422) was assisting Allied troops landing at Anzio on 24 January 1944 when at 20:01 the ship struck a mine on her starboard side. 7 men were killed and 25 were wounded by the explosion which almost broke the ship in two. Fortunately, the ship held together and survived a tow back to Naples for temporary patching and eventually back to the states for permanent repairs. Mayo required some four months of repairs before she returned to service.

USS Lansdale (DD-426) was escorting a convoy off the coast of Algeria during the night of 20 April 1944 when the convoy came under concentrated attacks by Luftwaffe bombers. The SS Paul Hamilton, steaming ahead of Lansdale, was struck by a torpedo at 21:00 and exploded in an enormous fireball, killing all 580 on board, as well as illuminating all nearby ships in the darkness.

Lansdale was attacked on two sides and while turning to avoid torpedoes, she was struck by another on her opposite side by a daring Ju 88 which was shot down as it passed a few feet above the ship. Lansdale was nearly split in two and started listing to port. After hanging on for another ten minutes and continuing to fire at attacking enemy planes, the Captain decided it was time to abandon ship. The destroyer broke in half and quickly sank, taking 47 men down with her. 147 of her crew (and two Germans) were rescued from the water.

USS Laffey (DD-459) was operating with TF 67 on the night of 13–14 November 1942 off Guadalcanal when at 0148, combat was initiated with a Japanese force including two battleships, and fourteen destroyers. During the action in a pitch-black night, the two sides of ships mixed, firing on friend and foe alike. Laffey nearly collided with Japanese battleship Hiei, missing the behemoth by 20 feet and then raked the bridge and superstructure of the battleship at point-blank range. Unfortunately, she was then tracked by the light cruiser Nagara and the destroyer Yukikaze, the latter hitting Laffey with three 5-inch (127 mm) shells which destroyed her turret 2, followed by two 14-inch (356 mm) hits from Hiei to her bridge and superstructure. The fatal blow came when one of Yukikaze's torpedoes blew off Laffey's stern and propellers, broke her keel, disabled electrical power, and started a massive fire. As her crew started to abandon ship, Laffey was ripped apart as the fires caused by Yukikaze's torpedo hit detonated her turret 4 magazines and the destroyer quickly sank with 59 of her crew killed and 116 wounded.

USS Farenholt (DD-491) was steaming with a task force on the night of 11–12 October 1942 on course to intercept Japanese shipping runs to Guadalcanal. In the ensuring Battle of Cape Esperance, Farenholt was hit by shells below the waterline from both Japanese and American guns causing concerning flooding. The crew shifted weight topside so the ship listed far enough to raise the holes out of the water. 3 men were killed and 43 wounded on Farenholt. After lengthy repairs, she returned to service in March 1943.

On 25 February 1944 Farenholt's destroyer squadron made a hit and run bombardment of Japanese facilities and positions on Kavieng. The Japanese responded with a heavy counterfire from shore batteries which holed the Farenholt at the waterline. Fortunately, there were no casualties and the ship's experienced crew quickly brought the flooding under control.

USS Bailey (DD-492) was operating with TF 8 on 27 March 1943 attempting to prevent a Japanese convoy from resupplying troops in the Aleutians Islands. The Americans made contact with the enemy convoy 0730, but soon realized they were outnumbered and outgunned. During the gun duel between ships, Bailey was hit by four 8-inch (203 mm) shells from Japanese heavy cruiser Nachi, killing 5 men, wounding 8 more, and bringing the ship to a stop. She would be repaired first at Dutch Harbor, then proceeded to Mare Island Navy Yard for permanent repairs. Bailey returned to service in October 1943.

USS Barton (DD-599) was operating with TF 67 on 13–14 November 1942 when the American ships engaged a Japanese surface task force in the first Naval Battle of Guadalcanal. The two sides engaged in combat at 0148 and the battle quickly turned into a chaotic, wild shootout in the pitch-black night. During the fight, Barton was firing at point-blank range on nearby enemy ships when suddenly the friendly cruiser Helena appeared directly in Barton's path. The ship came to a complete stop to avoid colliding with the larger cruiser, but before she could get moving again Barton was hit by two torpedoes amidships fired by the Japanese destroyer Amatsukaze. The huge explosions broke the Barton in two and she quickly sank. 168 of her crew went down with the Barton while 42 survivors were rescued.

USS Murphy (DD-603) was supporting the Operation Torch landings on 8 November 1942 when during an exchange of fire with a French shore battery, she was hit by a shell that penetrated the engine room, killing 3 men and wounding 25. Prompt and effective damage control allowed the ship to remain in action to complete the bombardment. The ship returned to Boston for repairs on 24 November.

On 21 October 1943, Murphy was escorting a convoy 75 miles off the coast of New Jersey when she was accidentally rammed by the oil tanker SS Bulkoil between her first and second stacks. The forward third of the ship separated and sank while the remaining stern section of the ship was towed back to New York Navy Yard. 36 men were killed in the accident. The Murphy had its bow replaced and returned to service in time to participate in Operation Overlord.

USS Caldwell (DD-605) was escorting landing craft at Ormoc on 12 December 1944 when at 0805 she was jumped by several enemy planes. A trio of A6M Zero fighters made bombing runs on the ship. Caldwell was hit by two bombs, one of the diving planes turned on its back and struck the bridge of the destroyer. Fires broke out which were quickly brought under control but the damage was extensive and required repairs. 33 of her crew was killed and another 40 wounded. The ship would return to the war to participate in the Okinawa campaign.

USS Gansevoort (DD-608) was operating near Mindanao on 30 December 1944 protecting unloading landing craft when at 1548 an enemy plane was observed dropping a bomb on a friendly ship and then turning towards the Gansevoort. The destroyer put up a barrage of fire but the incoming kamikaze struck the portside of the ship, its bomb exploding below decks starting fires and causing a list. The destroyer was aided by her fellow tin cans until all fires were out. 17 crewmen were killed and another 15 wounded. Gansevoort was towed to a nearby anchorage and had to endure more air raids before she was sufficiently repaired to make for a larger naval yard.

USS Kalk (DD-611) was patrolling off Biak Island on 12 June 1944 when a lone dive bomber dove out of the sun and landed its bomb abaft of the forward stack. The explosion sprayed shrapnel all over the ship, killing and wounding 70 men. Luckily the ship's torpedoes did not explode despite being mangled by the bomb hit. The fires were put out and volunteers detached the live warheads from the torpedoes. Kalk made for San Francisco to make repairs and returned to fight the war in October 1944.

USS Kendrick (DD-612) was en route to Oran on 2 September 1943 when she was surprised by a German Heinkel He 111 flying 50 feet over the water which dropped two torpedoes at the Kendrick. Although the enemy plane was shot down, one of the torpedoes it launched hit the ship's stern, killing one man, damaging steering and the fantail. The ship's crew threw a life raft to the enemy crew in the water and continued on their way to Oran. Kendrick would have to be towed back to the states and was out of action until February 1944.

USS McLanahan (DD-615) was participating in a bombardment patrol off the Ligurian coast when on 11 February 1945 a near-miss by a large-caliber shell sprayed the ship with shrapnel and knocked out a gun turret. One man was killed and 8 others wounded. Her damage was negligible and the ship remained on station.

=== Gleaves class ===
USS Plunkett (DD-431) was acting as a screen for transports landing at Cape Anzio on 24 January 1944 when she came under attack by Luftwaffe Junkers Ju 88 bombers at 1738. In a raid lasting 17 minutes; Plunkett was struck by a 550 lb. bomb which killed 51, wounded many more, knocked out an engine, and started several fires. The fires were extinguished by 1821. Plunkett was towed to Palermo and eventually the states for major repairs. She returned in time to participate in the Normandy invasion.

USS Kearny (DD-432) was assisting a British convoy under attack from a German "wolfpack" of submarines on the morning of 17 October 1941 when the ship was hit on her starboard side by a torpedo from U-568. The crew managed to keep the flooding isolated in the forward fire room and the ship was able to escape the danger and make it to Reykjavík for temporary repairs and back to New York for permanent repairs. 11 men were killed and another 22 wounded. This incident was one of several reasons cited by Hitler's declaration of war on the U.S. as justification of formally opening hostilities.

USS Gwin (DD-433) was operating with battleships Washington and South Dakota on course to intercept a Japanese naval task force on 14 November 1942. The two groups of ships made contact shortly before midnight. While dueling with the cruiser Nagara, Gwin took a shell hit in her engine room while another shell struck her fantail. Her damage was negligible and she continued to fire at any enemy ship within range.

On 30 January 1943 while supporting landings on the northern coast of Rendova Island, Gwin was hit by shore-based shell fire in her main deck aft which stopped her engine, killed three men and wounded seven others. The ship returned to the States for repairs and an overhaul, and was back in the combat zone by April 1943.

On 13 July 1943 during the Battle of Kolombangara, Gwin was turning with formation to bring all main batteries to bear on four enemy destroyers, when the Japanese ships released a salvo of over 30 torpedoes at the Americans. At approximately 0210 three US ships were hit by a spread of torpedoes from the destroyers Yukikaze, Hamakaze, Kiyonami, and Yūgure, including Gwin which was hit amidships by a torpedo in her engine room. When damage control efforts failed, the ship was abandoned and was scuttled by Ralph Talbot (DD-390), with a loss of 61 men.

USS Meredith (DD-434) was towing supplies on a barge to US forces holding Guadalcanal on 12 October 1942, when it was discovered that a Japanese carrier task force was nearby and all ships were to turn back immediately. The commander of Meredith decided to continue to deliver the urgently needed supplies. On 15 October 1942; Meredith was sighted by a Japanese scout plane and was soon attacked by 38 enemy planes from the aircraft carrier Zuikaku. Several bombs struck the bridge knocking out all communications, steering, and gun control. Although the crew of Meredith fought bravely and fiercely, the ship was hit by possibly fourteen bombs and seven torpedoes. Just ten minutes after the attack began, Meredith capsized and sank; taking 192 men down with her.

USS Monssen (DD-436) was operating as a part Task Group 67.4 under command of Rear Admiral Callaghan on 13–14 November 1942 when the task force engaged in the Naval Battle of Guadalcanal. At approximately 02:20 Monssen believed she spotted friendly signal lamps and responded. These were in fact star shells as the Japanese destroyers Asagumo, Murasame, and Samidare opened fire and blasted Monseen, followed by the battleship Hiei bushwacking the destroyer. Within two minutes she took at least 39 shell hits, and Monssen was quickly reduced to a burning hulk. Twenty minutes later, completely immobilized, and burning furiously; she was ordered abandoned. The burning ship floated for several hours in "Ironbottom Sound" before finally sinking. She lost 130 of her crew during the battle.

USS Ludlow (DD-438) was participating in the Operation Torch landings at Casablanca on 8 November 1942 when at 0700 French shore batteries opened fire on the landing American troops. Several American destroyers were called forward to silence the batteries. During the gunnery duel at 0720, Ludlow was hit by a shell which caused minimal damage and no casualties. The ship returned to New York for repairs and rejoined the war in January 1943.

USS Nicholson (DD-442) was participating in the conquest of Seeadler Harbor during the Admiralty Islands campaign on 6 March 1944 when the ship was assigned to draw fire from an enemy battery on nearby Hauwei Island. Nicholson was hit by a 4-inch shell that struck in the Number 2 ammunition handling room, killing three crewmen and wounding another four. Despite the damage, she completed her mission and was repaired and back in service just a few months later.

USS Ingraham (DD-444) was escorting a convoy off the coast of Nova Scotia on 22 August 1942 when she was called to investigate the USS Buck (DD-420), which had suffered a collision with a merchant vessel. Ingraham proceeded through in heavy fog and low visibility when suddenly the oil tanker USS Chemung appeared out of the thick fog. The two ships collided, causing severe damage to the Ingraham which began to sink immediately. As the ship went down, her depth charges exploded, killing several men trying to escape the sinking ship. Only 11 men survived on a lifeboat for more than 36 hours before being rescued.

USS Bristol (DD-453) was escorting a convoy to Oran on 13 October 1943, when at 0430 the ship was hit by a torpedo on her portside in her forward engine room, breaking her in two halves. The stern sank first shortly followed by the bow within 12 minutes. 52 men went down with the Bristol.

USS Hambleton (DD-455) was participating in the Operation Torch landings when on the evening of 11 November 1942 the ship was hit by a torpedo from German submarine U-173 on her portside amidships. The ship's crew fought to correct the 12-degree list to starboard by shoring up bulkheads and jettisoning heavy topside weight. The Hambleton was towed to Casablanca, where the ship was cut in half and reconnected with 40 feet of the ship's hull removed. The ship made for Boston to have permanent repairs done. On her way home, the crew got revenge by sinking the U-boat believed to have torpedoed her.

USS Rodman (DD-456) was escorting a minesweeper unit off Okinawa on 6 April 1945 when at 1515 a large flight of 50 to 75 enemy planes flew overhead. One of the planes dove on the Rodman, and crashed into her port bow. The kamikaze's bomb exploded under the ship and two more suicide planes struck the ship during the attack, but luckily Rodman's crew kept her from sinking. The ship was towed to Kerama Retto, then sent back stateside for the remainder of the war. She lost 16 men killed and another 20 seriously wounded.

USS Emmons (DD-457) was escorting a minesweeper unit off Okinawa on 6 April 1945 when at 1515 a large flight of 50 to 75 enemy planes attacked the American ships. Emmons was coming to the assistance of USS Rodman when she was targeted by multiple kamikazes. After shooting down six, she was hit nearly instantaneously by five suicide planes in a well-coordinated attack. The first hit the fantail, the second on the starboard side of the pilot house, the third struck the portside of the Combat Information Center, the fourth hit the number three five-inch gun, and the fifth hit the starboard side at the waterline.

Men began to abandon ship before the last plane even hit as the Emmons had become a blazing inferno. After a fruitless attempt to put the fires out, all men abandoned ship by 1800, just a couple hours after the deadly strike. The hulk of Emmons exploded at 1930 and was scuttled the next day. Her crew suffered 64 dead and 71 wounded.

USS Macomb (DD-458) was conducting radar picket duty on 3 May 1945 when at 1829 she was targeted by a Ki-61 "Tony" fighter that crashed into the ship's number three five-inch gun. The plane's bomb passed through the ship's hull and out the other side of the ship, causing minimal damage, and all fires were soon extinguished. 7 men of Macomb's crew were killed and 14 wounded.

USS Forrest (DD-461) was on patrol in Nakagusuku Bay on 26 May 1945 when at 2249 she was hit by a "Val" kamikaze that struck her starboard side just below the main deck. The ship lost five dead and thirteen wounded. Although down by the bow, Forrest was able to make it Kerama Retto for temporary patch-ups and eventually back to the states for permanent repairs, where she would be when the war ended.

USS Corry (DD-463) was preparing to bombard Utah Beach for Operation Overlord on 6 June 1944 when the plane which was supposed to deploy a covering smoke screen for Corry was shot down. Corry was exposed to German shore batteries that opened fire at 06:30 just when landing craft started for their attacks. Corry would at times approach within 1000 yards of the beach firing her guns at German pillboxes and emplacements. Soon after H-Hour, the destroyer was struck amidships by several large caliber shells. With the ship beginning to split in half; the crew abandoned the ship while still under fire from German guns. The Corry sank in 30 feet of water with her masts flying the colors and tops of her stacks still visible. 24 of her crew went down with the ship, and another 60 were wounded. The hull of the ship remains near Utah Beach protected as a war grave.

USS Hobson (DD-464) was performing radar picket duty with USS Pringle (DD-477) and two gunboats on 16 April 1945 when the small group was attacked by kamikazes at 0910. A single "Val" made a suicide run on Hobson from the starboard side. Five-inch shells obliterated the plane just a few dozen yards from short of the ship, but its 250 lb bomb penetrated the deck house. The bomb's explosion started fires in the gunnery, machine and electrical workshops and punched a hole through the deck over the forward engine room. Four of her crew were killed and six wounded. The ship was quickly repaired and was back stateside for permanent work by 15 June 1945.

USS Aaron Ward (DD-483) was operating with TF 67.4 of 5 cruisers and 8 destroyers on 13 November 1945 when the American ships encountered a Japanese surface task force including two battleships and 14 destroyers. At approximately 0225, Aaron Ward was hit by more than nine 6-inch (152 mm) or 5-inch (127 mm) shells from the secondary battery of the battleship Kirishima which knocked out her steering control. Unable to distinguish friend from foe in the darkness she attempted to move out of the lines of fire, going dead in the water as the firing ending with her bow taking water around 0235. The crew managed to get the engines fired up again and left the scene taking fire from the damaged Japanese battleship Hiei. The ship would receive repairs at Pearl Harbor and return to service by 6 February 1943.

On 7 June 1943, Aaron Ward was escorting LCT's to Guadalcanal when a Japanese air raid from the aircraft carrier Junyō found her. Several bombs landed on or near the Aaron Ward causing extensive damage and flooding to the engine room, fire rooms, and electric rooms. Although her crew tried valiantly to save her, Aaron Ward was abandoned and sank at 2135. She suffered 36 men killed and 59 were wounded.

USS Buchanan (DD-484) was operating with TF 67.4 on 13 November 1942 in "Ironbottom Sound" when the American ships engaged a Japanese surface task force of two battleships and fourteen destroyers at 0148. The battle became a wild close range gun fight with ships firing on friend and foe in the dark without positive identification. Buchanan was a victim of friendly fire, accidentally being struck by several shells later identified as US-made. The ship had to withdraw from the action to tend her damage. 5 men were killed during the battle. The Buchanan would return to service in February 1943.

USS Duncan (DD-485) was operating with TF 64 of 4 cruisers and 5 destroyers during the night of 11–12 October 1942, aiming to ambush approaching Japanese warships that were intending to bombard US Marine positions on Guadalcanal. Shortly before midnight, the American ships sprung their trap on the surprised Japanese and a thunderous gun fight ensued. During the course of the action, Duncan independently charged the Japanese fleet and attempted to torpedo the Japanese heavy cruiser Furutaka but was unsuccessful. In turn, the heavy cruiser Kinugasa remained undamaged and fired her guns on Duncan, which was hit by numerous shells that ignited large fires and put the ship out of action with extensive damage. The crew fought fires and attempted to beach their ship on Savo Island, but, when power failed, abandon ship was ordered. USS McCalla (DD-488) rescued 195 men from the shark-infested waters and attempted to tow Duncan away for salvage but the battered ship sank 6 miles north of Savo Island. 81 crew were killed during the night's action.

USS Glennon (DD-620) was providing fire support for troops pushing inland from the Normandy beaches on 8 June 1944 when at 0830 the ship struck a mine along her stern causing significant damage. As friendly ships were rescuing Glennon's crew off the ship, destroyer escort Rich also struck several mines; sinking in 15 minutes. Glennon was towed in an attempt to salvage her but on 9 June 1945, a German shore battery found its range on the ship and hit her with salvos of shells. The skeleton crew that had remained abandoned the Glennon, which floated until late 10 June 1944 when she sank. 25 men had been killed and another 38 were wounded during the action.

USS Maddox (DD-622) was supporting the invasion of Sicily on 10 July 1943, performing anti-submarine duties alone some 16 miles off the coast when she was attacked by an Italian Junkers Ju 88. A bomb struck the ship's aft magazines which detonated in a tremendous explosion. The ship rolled over and sank in under 2 minutes taking 202 crewmen down with her. 74 men were saved.

USS Nelson (DD-623) was supporting the invasion of Normandy off Omaha Beach when during the early morning hours of 13 June 1944 she made contact with an enemy E-boat at 0105. After an exchange of fire, Nelson was struck by a torpedo on her stern just aft of turret No.4. The explosion severed the ship and everything aft of turret No.4 leaving her dead in the water. 24 men were killed and missing, another nine were seriously wounded. The destroyer was towed to Boston, MA where she had a new stern installed. The Nelson returned to duty in November 1944.

USS Harding (DD-625) was on radar picket duty off Okinawa on 16 April 1945 when at 0958 she was attacked by two "Val's" off her starboard beam. The first was shot down but the second plane, although afire and shedding large pieces, continued to come in. The plane crashed just short of its target in the water, showering debris and water over the ship, however, its bomb exploded underwater; tearing a huge gash into the side of the Harding. The ship began to quickly flood and listed severely to port. She was able to make it make to Kerama Retto under her own power, suffering 22 dead and 10 seriously wounded. Harding would be repaired but missed the end of the war.

USS Butler (DD-636) was performing radar picket duty off Okinawa on 25 May 1945 when she was attacked by a kamikaze. The enemy bogey took fire and missed crashing into the ship but the plane's bomb detonated underneath the Butler in the water, damaging her keel and killing 14 men. All steam and electric power was temporarily lost when the forward fire room was flooded. The battleship USS West Virginia provided cover for the Butler while the crew worked to get power working again. The ship was able to make Kerama Retto for temporary patch-ups and eventually back to the states for permanent repairs, arriving 26 Aug 45.

USS Shubrick (DD-639) was acting as escort to the cruiser USS Savannah on the night of 4 Aug when she was attacked by Italian bombers. The enemy planes scored a direct hit amidships which caused flooding and knocked out all power. 9 crewmen were killed and 20 wounded. The Shubrick was towed to Malta and was able to make the US for permanent repairs on only one screw.

After repairs and an overhaul, Shubrick was transferred to the Pacific theater. On 29 May 1945, while performing radar picket duty, she was attacked by two kamikazes at 0010, one of which was shot down. The other plane slammed into the starboard side, its 550 lb bomb blasting a 30-foot hole into the side of the ship. The fires set off ammunition and the depth charges, which amazingly put most of the fires out. 35 crewmen had been killed and another 25 wounded. Shubrick was towed back to Kerama Retto for repairs and made it back to the US by 10 August.

USS Beatty (DD-640) was performing convoy escort duty in the Mediterranean off the coast of Algeria during the evening of 6 November 1943 when her group of ships came under air attack from Luftwaffe aircraft. While observing attacks on near-by ships, the crew of Beatty spotted an incoming Junkers Ju 88 coming in low on the water. Although the ship fired on the enemy plane, it came within 500 yards and dropped a torpedo which struck the ship on her portside. The ship's back was broken by the explosion along with the loss of power, and a 12-degree list. Although the crew battled valiantly to save their ship, Beatty could not be saved and broke in two halves, sinking at 2305. 12 of her crew were killed and 6 seriously wounded.

USS Turner (DD-648) was anchored not far from Ambrose Light on 3 January 1944 after a series of trips escorting convoys across the Atlantic when suddenly at 0650, several internal explosions in her ammunition storage area began to wreck the destroyer. The explosions continued to stagger the Turner until 0750 when a large violent explosion ripped the ship apart. She rolled over and sunk minutes afterwards, the tip of her bow bobbing in the water until 0827. 138 crewmen went down with Turner.

=== Fletcher class ===
USS Fletcher (DD-445) was bombarding Japanese strongholds defending Manila Bay on 14 February 1945, when the ship was hit by Japanese shore batteries at Los Cochinos Point which killed eight and wounded three crewmen. Damage was minimal and fires were extinguished; Fletcher would remain on station continuing bombardment until the 17th when she would make for minor repairs and continued her prestigious career.

USS Radford (DD-446) was operating off Luzon in Mariveles Bay on 14 February 1945, maneuvering to take the mined destroyer USS La Vallette in tow when the Radford itself struck a mine. The explosion killed three of the ship's crew. Repairs would send the Radford back stateside and would not return to the war zone.

USS La Vallette (DD-448) was escorting the torpedoed cruiser USS Chicago (CA-29) on their way out of the combat area near Rennell Island on 30 January 1943, when a wave of Japanese G4M "Betty" torpedo bombers attacked the American ships. Although several were shot down, at least six bombers were able to launch their warheads. La Vallette was hit by one torpedo in her forward engine room, causing severe damage; 22 men were killed. La Vallette was taken in tow by the tugboat Navajo to Espiritu Santo for temporary repairs, then traveled to Mare Island Navy Yard. She rejoined the fleet on 6 August 1943. On 14 February 1945 while operating off Luzon in Mariveles Bay, the La Vallette struck a mine that seriously damaged the ship and required her to be towed. Six men were killed and twenty-three wounded. The ship was repaired and sent home to San, Diego, California, where she was decommissioned after the war.

USS Chevalier (DD-451) was operating with the destroyers USS O'Bannon and USS Selfridge attempting to make a surprise interception of nine Japanese destroyers which were evacuating troops from Vella Lavella on 6 October 1943. After opening fire and blasting the Japanese destroyer Yūgumo, the Americans continued on course to bear all guns and torpedoes on the enemy. Unfortunately, their course took them into the path of a salvo of torpedoes fired from the sinking Yūgum, one of which struck Chevalier. Everything forward of the bridge was blown away from the ship by the explosion, and she was accidentally rammed from behind by the O'Bannon. Before giving the order to abandon ship, the crew of Chevalier fired a torpedo at a nearby Japanese destroyer, which exploded and sank soon afterwards. It was clear the ship could not be saved by 23:26, so the crew abandoned the Chevalier and was picked up by O'Bannon's boats. Fifty-four men went down with her, and another thirty-six were seriously wounded.

USS Saufley (DD-465) was conducting anti-shipping operations between Kolombangara and Choiseul on the night of 1 October 1943 when she was attacked by Japanese bombers that hit her with several bombs. Two crewmen were killed and eleven were wounded by the attacks. Damage was minimal and the ship remained on duty in the South Pacific.

On 29 November 1944, Saufley was performing anti-submarine patrols at the entrance to Leyte Gulf when she was hit by a kamikaze causing considerable hull damage and killing one man. The ship would make repairs in the Admiralty Islands then rejoin the fleet in time for the Invasion of Lingayen Gulf.

USS Strong (DD-467) was operating with TF 18 on 5 July 1943 supporting landings on New Georgia in the Kula Gulf by bombarding Japanese positions near Bairoko Harbor. Strong and Nicholas entered the harbor at 00:30 and began shelling when ten minutes later, Strong was hit by a torpedo on her portside aft. The damage was clearly severe enough to prompt the captain of Chevalier to ram Strong to give the crew of Strong an escape route from their sinking ship. As Japanese shells from shore began to come in, Strong was left to sink, breaking in half before going down. Forty-six members of her crew were lost with the ship, but luckily two hundred forty one were saved. The torpedo which sank Strong was fired by the Japanese destroyer Niizuki at over eleven miles (18 km) away.

USS De Haven (DD-469) was escorting landing craft near Guadalcanal on 1 February 1943 when her group was attacked by six Japanese planes. Three of the attackers were shot down, but the planes all released bombs together, scoring at least three hits and possibly three near misses. One of the bombs hit the bridge, killing the ship's commanding officer. The De Haven settled rapidly and sank two miles east of Savo Island, taking 167 lives of her crew down with her. Another thirty-four were seriously wounded.

USS Bache (DD-470) was performing radar picket duty off Okinawa on 13 May 1945 when thirteen Japanese aircraft attacked the area Bache was stationed. One plane made a run on the ship; its right wing hitting the No.2 smoke stack spinning the plane around into the deck amidships. Its bomb exploded just before impact with the deck causing extensive casualties and fires. All power and steam was lost and the ship had to be towed back to Kerama Retto. Forty-one of her crew were killed and thirty-six wounded.

USS Hutchins (DD-476) was performing close support operations off Okinawa on 27 April 1945 when the ship was attacked by a Japanese suicide boat. The fast, nimble little boat managed to sneak into the formation and detonated a charge alongside the hull of the Hutchins. A violent explosion rocked the ship, causing severe structural damage, but fortunately there were no casualties. Damage control was able to check flooding and the Hutchins retired to make repairs at Kerama Retto and eventually the States.

USS Pringle (DD-477) was escorting a resupply convoy to Mindoro on 30 December 1944 when she was targeted by a kamikaze. The enemy plane crashed into the ship's superstructure and a 40 mm gun mount. Eleven men were killed and another twenty seriously wounded in the attack. Pringle would be repaired and back in service by February 1945.

On 16 April 1945, Pringle was performing radar picket duty with USS Hobson (DD-464) and two gunboats off Okinawa when a small group of kamikazes attacked at 0910. After shooting down several planes coming at her, a single D3A "Val" crashed into the destroyer's bridge superstructure just abaft of the forward stack. The plane's bomb detonated in a violent explosion that buckled the Pringle's keel and effectively broke the ship in two. The ship quickly sank in less than six minutes, taking forty-seven crewmen down with her.

USS Stanly (DD-478) was performing radar picket duty off Okinawa on 12 April 1945 when she was targeted by two MXY-7 Ohka rocket-powered kamikaze gliders. The first suicide rocket hit the starboard bow at speeds in excess of 500 mph (800 km/h), but luckily the warhead punched through and exited out the portside of the ship, leaving a huge hole but only minor damage. A second Ohka (or "Baka Bomb" as the Americans called it) came in but missed the ship, taking off the Stanly's ensign as it went by before disintegrating in the ocean. Three crewmen had been wounded by the attack, but fortunately, nobody was killed on board Stanly.

USS Cony (DD-508) was supporting landing operations on the Treasury Islands on 27 October 1943 when she came under attack from several Japanese dive bombers. Despite putting up a fierce storm of anti-aircraft fire downing four planes in the process; Cony was suffered at least two hits on the main deck that killed eight and wounded ten. Damage was extensive enough to require a tow to Florida Island and finally on her own to the states. Cony returned to duty by March 1944.

USS Aulick (DD-569) was performing anti-submarine patrols near the entrance to Leyte Gulf on 29 November 1944 when at 1750 she was targeted by six "Oscar's". One of the attacking planes made it through the hailstorm of defensive fire and struck the bridge with its wing and spiraled into the No.2 five-inch gun starting several fires. Thirty-two men had been killed and sixty-four wounded, but the ship was able to make it to San Pedro Bay, then the states for repairs. She returned to the war in March 1945.

USS Renshaw (DD-499) was escorting landing craft through Surigao Strait into the Mindanao Sea on 21 February 1945 when she was targeted by a Japanese midget submarine that hit her with a torpedo. The ship was dead in the water, her forward engine room and aft fire room completely flooded and open to the sea. Nineteen men were killed and another twenty were seriously wounded. Despite the critical damage, Renshaw's crew was able to save the ship and made it to San Pedro Bay under her own power. The ship would make permanent repairs back in the states and played host to President Harry S. Truman for the "Navy Day" victory celebration in New York City on 27 October 1945.

USS Claxton (DD-571) was bombarding Japanese positions protecting Bougainville Island on 4 February 1944 when the ship was struck by as many as two (possibly eight-inch) shells which hit aft, wounding fifteen men but otherwise causing minimal damage. The ship was sent back to the west coast for repairs but returned to duty in April 1944.

Off Leyte Gulf on 1 November 1944, Claxton was coming to the aid of stricken destroyer USS Abner Read, which was sinking after several kamikaze strikes. A Japanese plane dove down out of the cloud cover and hit the water close aboard to the Claxton, its bomb detonating in the water. Although the ship suffered minor flooding, five dead and twenty three wounded; Claxton was able to complete her mission rescuing over one hundred eighty seven of Abner Read. The crew patched holes with mattresses and put in for repairs at Talcoban; and later Manus, she was back in action by January 45.

USS Guest (DD-472) was patrolling off Hagushi anchorage on 25 May 1945 when at 02:25, the ship was grazed by a single-engine plane which struck her mast and hit the water fifty yards off her starboard beam. No crew were wounded in this attack and damage was minor.

USS Foote (DD-511) was engaged with a Japanese task force during the Battle of Empress Augusta Bay when approximately at 03:00, the ship was struck by a torpedo from the Japanese destroyer Samidare which severed the stern from hull and killed nineteen men, another seventeen were wounded. Foote was left adrift until the Japanese broke off contact, afterwards she was taken under tow to Purvis Bay for repairs.

USS Spence (DD-512) was operating with Task Force 38 on 17 December 1944 in Philippine Sea when the US ships were hit by Typhoon Cobra. During the savage storm which at times had winds in excess of one hundred forty miles per hour, Spence was helplessly tossed about in the huge waves. The Spence's power and pumps failed when seawater damaged equipment on-board after the ship rolled seventy two degrees to port. A few minutes later around 11:00, the ship capsized after taking another massive wave hit. Of a crew of three hundred and thirty six, only twenty four were rescued.

USS Sigsbee (DD-502) was operating radar picket duty off Okinawa on 14 April 1945 when her group of ships were targeted by kamikazes. A lone A6M dove on the Sigsbee too quickly for the main battery to engage. The suicide plane struck the ship's fantail, its bomb detonating a violent explosion which severed the ship aft of the No.5 five inch gun, causing flooding and fires. Sigsbee lost twenty-two men killed and seventy-two wounded.

USS Brownson (DD-518) was screening landings at Cape Gloucester, New Britain on 26 December 43 when at 14:42 she was hit by two bombs from a "Val" dive bomber which struck starboard of centerline near the number two stack. The ship was split in half by an enormous explosion and sank at 14:59, taking one hundred eight crew down with her. The rest of her crew was rescued by friendly ships.

USS Abner Read (DD-526) was conducting anti-submarine duty off Kiska on 18 August 1943 when at 01:50, the ship struck a mine which triggered a violent explosion that severed the ship's stern at the aft 5"/38 caliber gun; seventy-one men were killed and another forty-seven wounded. Abner Read was taken under tow for repairs and returned to action by April 1944.

While providing cover for forces landing on Leyte, on 1 November 1944 at 13:41, Abner Read was targeted by a kamikaze "Val". Although a wing was shot off by the crew as it came in, the suicide plane crashed Abner Read amidships starting a large fire. The plane's bomb penetrated the deck, exploding in the engine room, and knocked out all water pressure to fight the fires. At 13:52, a violent internal explosion shook the ship, she began to sink stern first, rolling over and going under the waves at 14:15. Most of the crew was picked up by neighboring ships but twenty two crewmembers would go down with Abner Read.

USS Bennett (DD-473) was escorting landing ships off Okinawa on 7 April 1945 when the task force was attacked by a swarm of kamikazes. At 08:50 a D3A "Val" chose Bennett as its victim, and despite heavy fire plowed into the ship's starboard side. The plane's bomb detonated inside the ship, killing three men outright and wounding eighteen others. Damage was not severe and the ship was able to make for temporary repairs under her own power, then towed to Saipan by tug. Four more crewmen would pass away from their wounds in the following days.

USS Daly (DD-519) was providing fire support for forces at Okinawa when on 28 April 1945 at 17:00, a raid of kamikazes targeted Daly and her group of ships. The ship took an incoming "Val" under fire, causing the plane to miss the ship by a mere seventy-five feet. The plane's bomb detonated upon striking the water, spraying the ship with shrapnel, killing three and wounding another sixteen of Daly's crew. Damage was minimal and days later the ship resumed her duty.

USS Wadsworth (DD-516) was providing fire support to landings on Bougainville on 1 November 1943 during the Battle of Empress Augusta Bay when around 7:45 a group of six enemy dive bombers targeted Wadsworth and her sister ship bombarding the beach. Although all enemy bombs landed in water, one bomb missed the Wadsworth by less than twenty feet, spraying shrapnel across the deck. Two of Wadsworth's sailors were killed and another nine were wounded by bomb fragments. Two of the attacking planes were brought down.

USS Ammen (DD-527) was supporting the landing at Leyte on 1 November 1944 when at 09:52 she was chosen as the final destination for a kamikaze twin engine "Frances". The flaming plane crashed into the two smoke stacks some fifteen feet from the bridge crew before bouncing into the water causing significant damage. Fires were quickly brought under control and the ship remained on station. Five men were killed and another twenty one wounded.

USS Bullard (DD-660) was providing anti-aircraft support for the landings on Okinawa when at 13:57 on 11 April 1945, an enemy plane made a run on the destroyer. The suicide attacker barely missed striking the bridge, instead clipping the ship's antenna before tumbling into the sea. No casualties were reported and the ship remained on station.

USS Isherwood (DD-520) was operating off Okinawa on 22 April 1945 just west of Kerama Retto when at 17:25, her radar picked up incoming bogeys. Three enemy "Val's" approached the task force and made suicide dives on the American ships. One of the planes targeted Isherwood for destruction, coming in at thirty feet above the water off the starboard beam. The plane hit the ship's number three gun mount, igniting a large fire. The fires engulfed the ship's depth charges were cooked off and detonated at 18:16, causing extensive damage to the aft of the ship. Isherwood was able to put fires out and make it Kerama Retto for repairs under her own power. Forty two men were killed and another forty one wounded.

USS Hudson (DD-475) was performing anti-submarine duty off Okinawa on 22 April 1945 when she came under attack by kamikazes. A "Val" bore in on the ship off the port beam taking fire and aflame, but a last second turn by Hudson caused the plane to miss and slam into the water. Its bomb detonated in the water blowing the plane to smithereens and causing only superficial damage. One crewman was slightly wounded when a piece of the enemy plane's wingtip struck his head.

USS Mullany (DD-528) was on anti-submarine picket duty during the afternoon of 6 April 1945 when she was targeted by several kamikazes. Mullany took the first plane under fire, setting it ablaze but the determined suicide pilot slammed his plane into the after deckhouse starting a large fire. While fighting the fires the ship's depth charges detonated causing more destruction. The crew abandoned ship for fear of a magazine explosion but when nothing happened, a skeleton crew returned and got Mullany underway again. Thirty men had been killed, and another thirty six wounded. The ship made it back to San Francisco under her own power.

USS Kidd (DD-661) was protecting landing forces at Okinawa when she came under attack by kamikazes. One of the attackers flew low to the water and between the American ships, negating the effectiveness of their anti-aircraft fire. Smoking and burning, the kamikaze struck Kidd on the starboard side just below the main deck in the forward fire room. The plane's bomb pierced through the portside before exploding outside of the ship. Kidd was dead in the water and had to be protected by fellow ships while her crew got the engines going again, thirty eight men were killed and another fifty five wounded. Today, USS Kidd is a museum ship in Louisiana, the only surviving WWII destroyer in her wartime configuration.

USS Boyd (DD-544) was participating in the bombardment of Nauru Island on 8 December 1943 when she received orders at 10:33 to rescue the crew of a downed plane which landed in the water off the island. The ship reached the downed crews raft an hour later who were under fire from Japanese shore batteries. At 11:42, two Japanese shells found the Boyd, one striking the forward smoke stack, the other passed through the ship into the engine room and severed a steam line. Twelve men scalded to death and eight more were wounded. Boyd was able to make for repairs and returned to action by March 1944.

USS Bush (DD-529) was operating radar pickett duty off Okinawa on 6 April 1945 when at 14:30, several waves of kamikazes were detected approaching on radar. After vectoring friendly fighters to intercept and shooting down a few bogeys herself; at 15:13 a single "Jill" torpedo bomber approached low on the water. Despite the heavy fire, the plane managed to strike the ship at deck level on the starboard side between No.1 and No.2 stacks, causing a terrific explosion and killing every man in the forward engine room. While the crew fought fires, she was stalked by additional kamikazes which also sank the destroyer Colhoun.

At 17:25, a second plane dove on the ship, crashing in between the stacks and nearly breaking the ship in half. Another suicide plane hit the ship at 17:45, further spreading fires and igniting the ship's ammunition storages. Although the crew still believed their ship was salvageable; heavy swells broke the ship's back and she went down in two halves. Eighty-seven crewmen were lost with the Bush.

USS Braine (DD-630) was operating radar picket duty off Okinawa on 27 May 1945 when she was targeted by four "Val" kamikazes which dove out of the sky at 07:44 towards "Braine" and Anthony. The enemy planes approached through low clouds on the starboard side through heavy anti-aircraft fire which downed two of the attackers. The third plane; although damaged, managed to continue on and crashed into Braine's bridge and forward gun turrets. The fourth kamikaze smashed into Braine amidships causing extensive damage. After over four hours battling fires, throwing ammunition overboard and helping the wounded, the ship was finally brought under control. Braine managed to make it back to the states under her own power with her remaining crew. Sixty-seven men had been lost in the attacks, and one hundred and two were wounded.

USS Kimberly (DD-521) was performing radar picket duty off Okinawa on March 26, 1945, when during the morning hours ahe was attacked by two "Val" kamikazes which suddenly plunged down out of the clouds. Despite heavy anti-aircraft fire, one of the planes crashed his burning plane on top an aft gun mount, enveloping the aft of the ship in a fireball and flames. Damage control quickly put the fires out and the ship made for emergency repairs, but twenty seven men had been killed, and another thirty three wounded. Kimberly would survive the war to service with the Republic of China Navy until 1999, afterwards she was sunk in 2003 as a target.

USS Hazelwood (DD-531) was escorting carriers off Okinawa on 29 April 1945 when the task force was attacked by kamikazes. At 17:20, an A6M "Zero" fighter dove out of low cloud cover to hit Hazelwood. The kamikaze hit the water close aboard her port quarter, but ten minutes later, a second plane managed to evade deadly crossfire from astern, smashed through the stack and into the bridge. The front of the ship was doused in flaming gasoline, and the ship's mast toppled over. Fires were extinguished and the Hazelwood was towed away from the area for repairs. Forty-six crewmen were killed by the suicide plane; including the commanding officer, another twenty six were wounded.

USS Luce (DD-522) was on radar picket duty off Kerama Retto on 4 May 1945 when at 08:05 she was targeted by two kamikazes who split apart to make runs on opposite sides of the ship. The first plane missed but its bomb caused a power failure on Luce, freezing her main guns just as the second plane slammed into the aft section of the ship. The kamikaze knocked out her three aft turrets, all communications and causing a heavy list. Within minutes of the kamikaze strike, it was clear Luce was going to sink and the order to abandon ship went out. Less than ten minutes after being hit, Luce slipped beneath the waves. One of her depth charges would explode underwater causing injury to most of her men in the water. The crew of Luce lost one hundred forty-nine dead and ninety-four more were wounded.

USS Heermann (DD-532) was one of several American destroyers who charged an incoming Japanese fleet of battleships during the Battle off Samar. Launching torpedoes at the line of enemy battleships, forcing Yamato and several other battleships to reverse course. The destroyer then dueled with heavy cruiser Chikuma taking several hits from eight-inch shells that flooded the forward section of the ship and knocked out a five-inch gun, along with two under the keel explosions; near misses from the battleship Kongō fired at 28,000 yards. During the battle, four of Heermann's crew were killed and seventeen more wounded, but luckily she was the only destroyer of "Taffy 3" to survive the battle. The ship was repaired and returned to service shortly thereafter.

USS William D. Porter (DD-579) was patrolling off Okinawa on 10 June 1945, when at 08:15 she was targeted by a kamikaze "Val". The destroyer was able to evade the kamikaze and it splashed down in the water just yards away. Somehow, the plane ended up directly beneath Porter before it exploded, briefly lifting the ship out of the water due to the force of the underwater blast. She lost power and suffered broken steam lines. A number of fires also broke out. Her crew struggled to put out the fires, repair the damage, and keep the ship afloat but their efforts were in vain. Twelve minutes after the order to abandon ship went out, William D. Porter heeled over to starboard and sank by the stern. Miraculously, her crew suffered no fatalities.

USS Hoel (DD-533) was operating as escort for "Taffy 3" on the morning of 25 October 1944 off Samar, when a huge Japanese task force of battleships and cruisers suddenly appeared over the horizon coming straight for the small American ships. After laying smoke and guiding the escort carriers into a rain squall; Hoel charged the Japanese formation, heading straight for the battleships. Hoel launched torpedoes that missed the battleship Kongō, only to be blasted by gunfire from the heavy cruiser Haguro which destroyed three of her five 5-inch (127 mm) guns and her bridge.

The ship continued on and dumped the rest of her torpedoes at the Japanese fleet, forcing the battleships Yamato and Nagato out of the battle for 20 minutes, but not before both battleships blasted Hoel and further crippled her. The ship continued on attempting to defend the escort carriers, only for those same battleships to find her at 9,000 yards and rake her again, including multiple 16.1-inch (41 cm) shell hits from Nagato's main guns. After taking some forty direct hits, at 08:30 a 6.1-inch (155 mm) shell from Yamato silenced her last boiler, and Hoel began listing to port, prompting the order to abandon ship. The Japanese fired at the doomed ship as her surviving officers and men went over the side, finally ceasing fire at 08:55 when Hoel rolled over and sank. Only eight-six of Hoel's complement survived; two hundred and fifty three officers and crew died with their ship, at least forty men perished in the water while awaiting rescue.

USS Halligan (DD-584) was conducting patrols just off Okinawa near Tokashiki Island on 26 March 1945 when at 18:35, a tremendous explosion shook the ship sending smoke and debris over two-hundred feet in the air. The destroyer had hit a mine head on, detonating the forward magazines and obliterating the forward section of the ship, back to the forward stack. The crew abandoned ship as Halligan quickly took on water and began to sink. The hulk of the abandoned ship drifted ashore to Tokashiki where it was shelled by the Japanese and pounded by the surf. One hundred sixty of her men were lost including nineteen of her twenty one officers.

USS Haggard (DD-555) was operating as a screen for Task Force 58 on 29 April 1945 when at 16:53 the ship was targeted by two A6M kamikazes which dove from astern. The suicide plane ran a parallel course with Haggard but turned sharply towards the ship's starboard beam, striking the water just a few yards from the ship. The plane's bomb managed to punch through the hull and explode in the engine room causing flooding and fires. The second kamikaze missed the bow by ten feet and exploded in the water, showering debris and water over the bridge. Prompt damage control managed to prevent more serious flooding and Haggard was towed to Kerama Retto with eleven dead and forty wounded. The ship would not be returned to service.

USS Haraden (DD-585) was operating in the Sulu Sea on 13 December 1944, when three kamikazes were spotted coming at her at 17:15 off her starboard beam. Two of the planes were shot down by a pursuing F4F, but the remaining plane managed to bank sharply and hit Haraden. The plane's right wing hit the torpedo director and pilot house while the fuselage struck the forward stack and exploded. The impact and resulting fires brought the destroyer to a halt and friendly ships had to help fight fires. Within a couple hours the fires were under control and the ship was able to make it back to the states for repairs. Fourteen of her crew had been killed and twenty-four wounded.

USS David W. Taylor (DD-551) was bombarding Chichi Jima on 5 January 1945 when around 07:45, the ship was rocked by an underwater explosion, most likely caused by a mine. The explosion heavily damaged David W. Taylor causing flooding, and the crew suffered four men killed. Fortunately the ship's crew was able to bring her safely to Saipan by 7 January 1945 under her own power. The David W Taylor rejoined the fleet and participated in the final days of the Okinawa campaign.

USS Hunt (DD-674) was on radar picket duty off Okinawa on 14 April 1945 when at 13:48 during a raid by multiple kamikazes, a D4Y "Judy" broke away from its group and dove at the firing destroyer. The suicide plane smashed into the mainmast and forward stack of the ship, wounding five men and starting several fires. Damage was minimal and Hunt remained on station. The ship remained commissioned in the Navy until 1963.

USS Hopewell (DD-681) was providing fire support for minesweepers just prior to the amphibious landings on Corregidor near Mariveles Bay on 14 February 1945, when she engaged a Japanese battery of 150mm guns that had damaged her sister destroyer Fletcher. The Japanese directed their fire onto Hopewell, hitting the destroyer at least four times and knocking out her battery control station and a five-inch turret. Six men had been killed and another eleven more wounded. Despite the damage, Hopewell remained on station in Manila Bay for several more days before steaming for repairs at Manus. The ship would serve the Navy until the Vietnam War and was sunk as a target in 1972.

USS Wadleigh (DD-499) was helping with sweeping mines out of the supply lanes near Kossol Roads off Palau on 23 September 1944, when she struck an unnoticed mine amidships that ripped into the bowels of the ship. Three men had been killed and another twenty wounded as several compartments flooded aft. The ship settled by the stern and developed a list to starboard, however the Wadleigh was saved by her crew who had shifted weight to port which evened the list. Although the crew feared the destroyer would break in half while under tow, Wadleigh was brought back to seaworthy condition and made its way back to the states for a near complete overhaul.

USS Halsey Powell (DD-686) was alongside the carrier Hancock topping off her fuel tanks off Okinawa when at 14:00 on 20 March 1945, the task force came under attack by kamikaze planes. An A6M overshot the giant carrier and crashed into Halsey Powell steaming less than two hundred yards off the starboard bow of Hancock. The plane's wing clipped the aft five-inch gun while the fuselage smashed down through the main deck and into the ship's living spaces near the fantail. The crash jammed the ship's steering gear, causing a near collision with the huge Essex class carrier. Fires would be extinguished and a ten degree list corrected before the Halsey Powell was able to make her way back to Ulithi on 25 March. The crew lost twelve men killed and another twenty-nine wounded by the kamikaze hit.

USS Johnston (DD-557) was providing cover for escort carriers off Leyte Gulf as part of "Taffy 3" which on 25 October 1944 was engaged by a huge fleet of Japanese surface ships in the Battle off Samar. Johnston's commander Ernest J. Evans; without waiting for orders, broke formation and charged at the incoming Japanese fleet despite the obvious fact that his ship was heavily outnumbered, and severely out of her weight class in firepower. Nevertheless Johnston managed to permanently damage the heavy cruiser Kumano with a torpedo hit that blew off her bow, enabling her to be finished off by mixed submarine and air attacks.

Unfortunately; Johnston ran out of luck when she was crippled by three 18.1-inch (46 cm) and three 6.1-inch (155 mm) shell hits from the Japanese battleship Yamato. The wounded Johnston continued on, firing multiple Japanese vessels, only to engage in a 1v5 against the light cruiser Yahagi and the destroyers Yukikaze, Isokaze, Urakaze, and Nowaki (later joined by the heavy cruiser Suzuya), and went down fighting in a blaze of glory. Yukikaze closed to point blank range and pumped one last salvo into the destroyer to make sure she sank, then saluted the Johnston as she went down. Many of Johnston's wounded survivors would endure several days in shark infested waters awaiting rescue; her fearless commander Ernest E Evans was not among the survivors. Johnston's brave crew would lose one hundred eighty‐six men.

USS Twiggs (DD-591) was on radar picket duty off Senaga Shima on 16 June 1945 when at 20:30, a single low flying B6N "Jill" dropped a torpedo which hit Twiggs on her port side, detonating her No. 2 magazine. The plane then circled and completed its kamikaze mission with a suicide crash into Twiggs on the ship's aft section. The resulting explosion detonated the ship's aft magazine storage enveloping the destroyer in flame. Within an hour, Twiggs sank taking one hundred eighty-four crewmen down with her. Despite the hazard of exploding ammunition from the blazing Twiggs, escorting ships were able to rescue one hundred eighty-eight survivors from the oily waters.

USS Norman Scott (DD-690) was providing fire support for the amphibious landings to capture Tinian Island on 24 July 1944 when at 07:40, previously unseen Japanese six-inch shore batteries began firing on the American ships, in particular the battleship Colorado. Norman Scott positioned herself so as to draw fire away from the battleship some 1,800 yards from shore, unfortunately the valiant maneuver would cost the destroyer. Norman Scott took as many as six direct hits over a fifteen-minute period which knocked out several guns and struck the bridge. Amongst the twenty-two dead was the ship's captain; another fifty more were wounded. Despite the damage the ship made its way back to the states for permanent repairs. The ship was back in service by October 1944.

USS Newcomb (DD-586) was part of an anti-submarine screen off Lingayen Gulf on 6 January 1945 when her task force came under attack by kamikazes. After driving off several potential attackers, two "Tony" fighters closed in on Newcomb from the port side. Although both planes were downed, the second plane hit water a mere twenty-five yards from the destroyer and exploded; showering the ship with shrapnel. Two men were killed and fifteen wounded although damage was minor. While screening for minesweepers off lejima on 6 April 1945, Newcomb came under sustained attack by a huge swarm of kamikazes Aided by low clouds, five enemy suicide planes managed to crash into Newcomb five times; knocking out her power, engulfing the ship in flames, and causing extensive damage to her topside superstructure. The ship had to be towed away from the battle area after losing forty-three men killed and sixty-four wounded. Due to the war coming to an end a few months after receiving her damage, Newcomb was not repaired or returned to service.

USS Albert W. Grant (DD-649) was launching a torpedo attack on Japanese battleships during the Battle of Surigao Strait on 25 October 1944, when at 04:07 the destroyer was struck by several shells from both Japanese and American guns. The Grant was hit at least twenty-two times, the majority of the projectiles were armor piercing six-inch shells from USS Denver (CL-58). Steam lines were ruptured, several compartments at the waterline were floated, power and steering were lost, and a number of fires broke out across the ship. Although their ship was down by the bow and listing heavily to port, the destroyer's crew got the engines working again and enabled Grant to retire to friendlier waters. Grant had lost thirty-eight men killed, more than half of them by friendly fire; another one hundred four were wounded during the battle.

USS Callaghan (DD-792) had taken station in the radar picket line the evening of 28 July 1945, where at 00:35 on the 29th she drove off an incoming Yokosuka K5Y biplane. The aircraft survived the first approach because the proximity fuses were ineffective against its wooden fuselage then, skimmed low on the water undetected, and crashed into Callaghan on the starboard side. The kamikaze's bomb penetrated the aft engine room and exploded, jamming the rudder. Callaghan flooded and the fires which ignited anti aircraft ammunition prevented nearby ships from rendering aid. To complicate matters further; the ship had no water pressure to fight the growing fires. Despite her crews best efforts, Callaghan sank at 02:35 with the loss of forty-seven members of her crew. She was the last Allied ship sunk by a kamikaze attack during World War II.

USS Longshaw (DD-559) was en route to her patrol area on the morning of 18 May 1945, following a four-day period of fire support when at 07:19, the destroyer ran aground on a reef just south of Naha Airport. A tug came to help tow the ship to safety but as soon as towing began, Japanese shore batteries began to land shells in between the two American vessels. Longshaw returned fire best as possible but unfortunately lost the gun duel as her forward magazines took a direct hit; exploded, and completely severed the bow. Efforts to save the ship were abandoned and her crew went over the sides just minutes later. Longshaw's crew lost eighty-six men killed including the captain, and ninety-five more were wounded. The hulk of the ship would later be destroyed by US gunfire later that same afternoon.

USS Bryant (DD-665) was rushing provide relief to fellow radar picket destroyer USS Laffey (DD-724) on 16 Apr 45 when she herself came under attack by six "Zero" fighters closed on the warship in a shallow glide. Her port batteries dispatched one, and the CAP splashed another; but a third attacker, survived the gauntlet of fire to crash into Bryant just below the bridge. The kamikaze's bomb detonated, engulfing the bridge in flames and inflicting damage to communication, fire control and radar equipment. Fires were out within a couple minutes and although the ship still made twenty-three knots, the damage was severe enough to send Bryant back stateside for repairs. The war would end before the destroyer could return to action, and Bryant would sit in reserve for thirty years before scrapping.

USS Evans (DD-552) had been fending off snooping Japanese planes throughout the night of 10 May 1945 at radar picket station No.15 to the Northwest of Okinawa, when at 07:40 on the 11th, a storm of over one hundred fifty kamikazes approached the small formation of American ships. Combat Air Patrol managed to shoot down close to fifty planes but still over a hundred planes would close in on the two destroyers and three Landing Craft Support. Evans fought valiantly during the assault, shooting down at least fourteen attackers but was unable to avoid being struck herself. The first two planes struck the ship on her portside at the waterline causing flooding and fires, while an "Oscar" slammed into her starboard side causing a large fire and stopping the ship dead in the water. Several more kamikazes would nearly hit the stricken destroyer but fortunately Evans was assisted by her fellow ships who provided firefighting and anti-aircraft support. Evans would survive her ordeal losing thirty-three men and twenty-nine wounded; the ship was towed for repairs and scrapped in 1947.

USS Morrison (DD-560) was manning radar picket station No.1 off Northeast Okinawa the morning of 4 May 1945 when at 08:25; after several close encounters with kamikazes, two A6M "Zero's" managed to crash into the ship. The first crashed at the base of her forward stack and next smashed into her No.3 five-inch gun disabling the weapon. At that time seven float biplanes made their way to the area and homed in on the burning Morrison who had difficulties shooting down the wooden biplanes which did not detonate VT fuses.

The first biplane hit near the No.3 five-inch turret, detonating the powder bags and causing a huge explosion at 08:34, while just seconds later the second biplane bounced off the water before impacting the No.4 five-inch gun turret setting off another huge fireball. With this fourth kamikaze crash, the destroyer began to quickly list and sink by the stern. Morrison slipped beneath the sea at 08:40, taking the lives of one hundred fifty-seven men with her, most crewmen below decks were lost because the ship sank so quickly.

USS Cassin Young (DD-793) was battling multiple attacks from Japanese kamikazes on 12 April 1945 while serving radar picket duty off Okinawa, when at 13:37 a D3A "Val" dove on Cassin Young from a steep angle. Defensive anti-aircraft fire hit the plane, detonating its bomb only forty feet above the ship and showering debris and shrapnel over the exposed areas of the destroyer. Although damage was negligible, one man was killed and another fifty-eight wounded, many seriously.

On 30 July 45, Cassin Young was patrolling near the entrance to Nakagusuku Bay to the Southeast of Okinawa when at 03:00, the destroyer picked up two incoming bogeys and fired upon them. One attacker was shot down but the second made it through intense fire and crashed into the superstructure of the bridge under the forward stack causing a tremendous explosion. Luckily Cassin Young was assisted in firefighting by friendly ships and her crew managed to get one engine working again despite the heavy damage. The ship made its way to Kerama Retto under her own power, twenty-two men had been lost and another forty-five wounded in one of the last successful kamikaze attacks of the war.

USS Ross (DD-563) was conducting escort for minesweeping ships off Dinagat Island on 19 October 1944 when at 01:33 she struck a mine to port under the forward engine room and fireroom. The destroyer took on water and began listing to port. At 01:55 she struck a second mine in the vicinity of the after engine room. Ross was towed away to safety and placed in a floating drydock. Twenty-three of her men had been killed and eleven more had been wounded from the mine explosions. While being repaired in floating drydock on 24 November 1944, Ross was hit again by a Ki-44 kamikaze which set gasoline fires that were quickly extinguished. Ross suffered no casualties in this attack but her repairs were delayed for several more months.

USS Leutze (DD-481) was giving assistance to underwater demolition teams off the shore of Iwo Jima when the ship received a hit from a Japanese artillery gun. The shell on the after part of the forward stack, seriously wounding four men, including the captain. The ship competed the mission before transferring her wounded and getting repairs.

On 6 April 1945 just off Iejima, Leutze had pulled alongside her sister ship Newcomb which had been hit by multiple kamikazes to give assistance fighting fires and rescuing wounded. During the rescue, Newcomb was hit by another kamikaze, but the plane's bomb bounced off the deck and into the side of Leutze. The explosion nearly tore off the fantail of the destroyer, killed eight men and wounded thirty. The Leutze was towed away from the combat area for repairs but the end of the war left her only for the scrap yard.

USS Howorth (DD-592) was operating six miles south of Ieshima with the company of other destroyers on 6 April 1945 when at 16:12 she was attacked by multiple kamikazes. Gunfire managed to bring several attackers down but one enemy plane made it through the fierce defensive fire to crash into Howorth's superstructure and her main battery gun. Nine men were killed by the crash and another twenty two wounded. The seriousness of her damage would mean that Howorth would have to put in to the states for repairs. The ship would be placed in reserve and sunk by torpedo testing in 1962 off San Diego, California.

USS Colhoun (DD-801) was providing fire support for Marines assaulting Iwo Jima on 1 March 1945 when she was hit by a shell from a Japanese shore battery which killed one man and wounded another sixteen. Damage was negligible but the ship would make at Saipan before returning to combat in time for the Okinawa invasion. On 6 April 45, Colhoun was rushing to aid heavily damaged USS Bush (DD-529) at 16:00 when the destroyer was targeted for attack by several incoming waves of kamikazes. The enemy suicide planes would come on in groups to devert the defensive fire of the ship, Colhoun shot down three of the first group but the fourth crashed into a 40mm gun mount. The plane's bomb penetrated the deck to explode in the aft engine room. Another trio of kamikazes bore in, two were downed but the third slammed into the starboard side of the hull, its bomb would break the back of the Colhoun, snuff out boilers, and opened a huge gash on the side of the ship to the sea. Two more kamikazes would crash into the stricken Colhoun, the final one impacting the ship's bridge. A nearby Landing Craft Ship took off the surviving crew at 18:00 while a tugboat attempted to tow the destroyer away, but fires and a heavy list made it obvious that she could not be saved and was sunk by gunfire. Colhoun lost thirty-four men and suffered some twenty-one wounded.

USS Gregory (DD-802) was patrolling radar picket duty in company with three Landing Craft Ship on the afternoon of 8 April when at 18:30, four Japanese Ki-51 Sonia planes dove from out of the sun, a favorite tactic of the kamikaze. One of the planes although hit many times, still managed to crash into Gregory on the portside amidships just above the waterline, pubching through the hull to flood her firerooms and forward engine room. Fortunately only two men were wounded by this attack, and there were no fatalities. The ship was able to make it back to Kerama Retto for repairs and continued serving a long career in the Navy.

USS Little (DD-803) was patrolling at picket duty No.10 on 3 May 1945 in company five other ships when at 18:13 hours, incoming enemy aircraft were picked up on radar. As many as twenty-four kamikazes descended through the low clouds to attack the American ships below. Just a few minutes after USS Aaron Ward (DM-34) was struck by a suicide plane, at 18:43 Little would take a kamikaze hit on her portside that broke her keel and started a huge fire. Within just a couple minutes a second plane would crash into the ship's midsection, followed quickly by two more simultaneously striking the bow and fantail. These impacts on the Little demolished her topside superstructure and she began listing heavily to port when her captain gave the order to abandon ship. The destroyer would break in half and sink under the waves by 18:55, her crew lost thirty men dead and another seventy-two wounded.

=== Allen M. Sumner class ===
USS Allen M. Sumner (DD-692) was making a night-time sweep with two other destroyers targeting Japanese transports unloading supplies in Ormac Bay just after midnight on 3 December 1944. Although the American ships managed to sink the transports, the Japanese responded ferociously with planes, destroyers, and shore batteries; in the fierce fighting USS Cooper was hit by a torpedo and sank. Sumner was damaged by a near missed bomb which threw fragments across the deck wounding thirteen men, she was also hit by a shore battery which caused negligible damage.

On 2 January 1945, Sumner was supporting a minesweeping group in Lingayen Gulf when at 11:58 several kamikazes swooped in out of the sun and lined up to hit the destroyer. The first two planes were shot down, but a third plane crashed into the after stack before skidding across the deck into the water, its bomb detonating on the main deck near the No.2 torpedo launcher. A second kamikaze hit the port side of the bridge. Although damage did not threaten the integrity of the hull, extensive damage required her to retire from the gulf. The Allen M. Sumner lost fourteen men killed and nineteen wounded.

USS Moale (DD-693) was making a night-time sweep with two other destroyers targeting Japanese transports unloading supplies in Ormac Bay just after midnight on 3 December 1944. After sinking the Japanese transports, the American destroyers were counterattacked by the defending Japanese forces. Moale would take several hits from shore batteries which killed three and wounded twenty-five men, but damage was not serious.

While assisting a damaged "LST" which had been hit by a kamikaze on 15 December 1944, off Mindoro when the landing ship suffered from a large magazine explosion. Fragments of debris and shrapnel would strike the Moale killing one sailor and wounding another ten men. Damage to the destroyer was patched up and she would remain on station.

USS Ingraham (DD-694) was serving on the radar picket line off Okinawa on 4 May 1945 when her group of ships were targeted by a large swarm of kamikazes. At 08:22 Ingraham became the prime focus of the Japanese suicide planes after two other American ships had been sunk. The destroyer fiercely defended herself knocking down at least seven planes within a few short minutes before an A6M "Zero" managed to strike the ship at the waterline on her portside. The plane's bomb punched through to explode in the ship's forward diesel room causing severe flooding and killing fourteen men. Another thirty-seven were wounded by the crash and explosion, but damage control parties were able to save Ingraham. The ship was still in the United States undergoing repairs when the war ended. After a lengthy career with the US Navy; Ingraham was sold to Greece in 1971 and sunk as a target in 2001.

USS Cooper (DD-695) was making a night-time sweep with two sister destroyers attempting to sink Japanese transports unloading supplies in Ormac Bay just after midnight on 3 December 1944. The American ships were able to sink the Japanese transports, but the enemy responded with equal fury in kind. Two Japanese destroyers were able to engage the trio of American ships. During the intense gunfire, at 00:13 Cooper was struck amidships on her starboard side by a torpedo, most likely from the Japanese destroyer Take. The explosion split the Cooper in half and she rapidly began sinking, slipping beneath the sea in just under a minute. Due to the intensity of the battle, her fellow destroyers could not stop to render assistance to Cooper's surviving crew in the water, many of whom had to wait hours before rescue from PBY Catalinas. One hundred ninety-one men were lost with Cooper.

USS Haynsworth (DD-700) was steaming off Okinawa on 6 April 1945 fighting off sporadic attacks on her task group by kamikazes through the early morning hours when at 12:50, a single D4Y "Judy" dive bomber broke from its formation and headed straight for the ship. Haynsworth unleashed a monsoon of defensive fire which turned the incoming kamikaze back, but the suicide attacker made another sharp bank for the ship. The plane smashed into the ship's main radio transmitter room spreading a large fire over the ship's superstructure, fortunately the plane had lost its bomb as it violently maneuvered to hit the ship, certainly sparing the ship more damage. Fires were put out an hour later and Haynsworth made her way back to Kerama Retto for repairs. After decades serving the US Navy, the destroyer was sold to Taiwan in 1970 and sunk as an artificial reef in 2001.

USS Hank (DD-702) was patrolling as radar picket off Okinawa the afternoon of 11 April 1945 when the ship's crew sighted an incoming [A6M] "Zero" coming in low off the port bow heading for the bridge. Hank put up a furious barrage of defensive fire which caused the kamikaze pilot to miss his target, splashing the sea just a few yards away and exploding. The kamikaze hit close enough in the water to hurl debris and shrapnel over the exposed areas of the Hank killing three men and wounding ten more. Damage however was slight and repaired.

On 9 August 1945, Hank and Borie would find themselves in the midst of five circling kamikazes stalking the two destroyers from above. After hitting Borie the remaining planes turned their attention to Hank. The first kamikaze; an A6M, came in from straight ahead but missed the ship due to a last second maneuver, showering the destroyer with debris. A second kamikaze came screaming in but its wing was shot off sending the plane tumbling into the ocean, dousing the Hank with burning gasoline in the process. The ship lost one man and five wounded in one of the final kamikaze attacks of the war. Postwar, Hank served in Korea and was sold to the Argentinian Navy in 1972.

USS Borie (DD-704) was acting as picket duty for returning carrier planes with USS Hank (DD-702) on 9 August 1945 when at 14:50 the two picket destroyers came under a concentrated kamikaze attack by five circling planes. At 14:56, a [D3A] "Val" broke from its group and dove down on Borie, hitting the ship between her mast and five-inch gun director. The plane's bomb passed through the ship, exploding close enough for shrapnel to kill and injure several men. Fires were extinguished after twenty minutes and the ship rejoined formation but several gun mounts were destroyed. Borie would return to the main task force to transfer her wounded to a hospital ship, the ship lost forty-eight dead and sixty-six wounded.

USS Barton (DD-722) was participating in the bombardment of Cherbourg on 25 June 1944 supporting US Army troops assaulting German fortifications around the port city, when the ship was hit by a dud shell from an enemy shore battery. The dud landed in the aft diesel room creating a hole in the side of the Barton but no further damage. The destroyer responded with effective fire onto the German battery that hit her, who did not fire again for the rest of the bombardment. The ship had no casualties from this event.

USS Walke (DD-723) was participating in the landings on Luzon, 2 January 1945 when at 11:55 while providing support in Lingayen Gulf, her crew sighted four enemy Ki-63 "Oscar's" incoming at low altitude. Walke was able to shoot down the first two attackers, however the third kamikaze crashed into the bridge on the portside, engulfing the ship's superstructure in flames, and knocking out the ship's main battery control directors. The ship's Commanding Officer George Fleming Davis was mortally wounded by the crash but refused to be carried away for medical treatment until he was assured by his crew the ship would be saved; he would posthumously receive the Medal of Honor. Fires would be extinguished within fifteen minutes and Walke would remain on station until 9 January 1945. Twelve of her crew members were killed by the kamikaze attack, and another thirty-four were seriously wounded.

USS Laffey (DD-724) was serving radar picket duty with two escorts off the northern coast of Okinawa on 16 April 1945 when at 08:27, a massive swarm of at least fifty Japanese planes approached and circled the three American ships. Laffey shot down four kamikaze planes before the fifth suicide plane struck a glancing blow on gun mount three and tumbled into the sea. A sixth plane came in low at 08:45 and smashed into No.43 and No.44 20mm gun mounts, starting a gasoline fire and knocking the positions out.

Moments later, two D3A Val's crashed into the No.3 5" gun turret, killing several men and destroying the turret. Another D3A which made a low gliding bomb run on the ship, which struck the stern deck and jammed the ship's rudder. Two more kamikazes would make successive direct hits on the ship's aft fireroom, adding to the carnage. Combat Air Patrol arrived at the right time to drive off the remaining enemy planes and saved Laffey from further damage.

At least twenty-two Japanese planes would make direct assaults on Laffey and her escorts during the eighty minute battle; although all three in the group were damaged, every ship miraculously made it back to port. ‘’Laffey’’ had been hit by six kamikazes and at least two bomb hits, lost thirty-two men killed, and seventy-one wounded. The ship returned to the States under her own power and served in the Korean and Vietnam Wars. Today she is a museum ship in Charleston, South Carolina.

USS O'Brien (DD-725) was supporting minesweepers well inshore of the battleship Texas which was engaging German shore batteries at Cape Levi, near Cherbourg on 25 June 1944. O'Brien's own gunfire was so accurate that enemy gunnery positions shifted from Texas to O'Brien. She received a direct hit just abaft the bridge, but was able to stay on station long enough to lay a smoke screen for Texas. Thirteen men were killed and nineteen wounded in this action.

On 6 January 1945 while escorting a minesweeper group off Lingayen Gulf, O'Brien was targeted by two kamikazes at 1427. One missed the ship and the other crashed into the port side of her fantail, knocking off a large piece but luckily nobody was hurt.

On 27 March 1945, while cruising near Kerama Retto; O'Brien was attacked by two kamikazes that had been following a group of passing American planes. The first plane was blasted by gunfire and landed in the sea less than seventy-five yards away. The second plane; likely a D3A "Val" made a steep dive on O'Brien, and despite heavy damage landed forward of amidships on the portside. The plane's bomb detonated a magazine, causing a large explosion. Damage control teams quickly extinguished the blaze and brought the situation back under control. Fifty crewmen were killed and seventy-six wounded by the kamikaze which sent O'Brien back to the states.

USS Meredith (DD-726) had been shelling Utah Beach during the Normandy Invasion on 6 June 1944; when she struck a mine that killed seven men, wounded fifty more, and severely damaged the ship. Meredith was abandoned in a calm orderly fashion and her hull was towed to Baie de la Seine. On 9 June 1944, a night-time Luftwaffe air raid dropped a large (possibly guided) bomb that impacted the water about five hundred yards off Meredith. The shockwave from the explosion caused even more damage to the ship's hull, most certainly breaking her keel. She finally broke in half and sank thirty-six hours after the mine hit. Meredith lost thirty-five of her men killed, another twenty-five wounded.

USS Maddox (DD-731) was acting as picket for carriers off Formosa (Taiwan) on 21 January 1945; when at 13:10 a single A6M "Zero", which had followed a group of F6F Hellcats to avoid detection, made a steep dive towards the Maddox from above and directly astern. As the plane was about to impact the ship, the kamikaze pulled out of his dive for his left wing to impact the ship's antenna, tumbling the plane's wreckage down onto a 40mm gun mount on the portside of the superstructure. The plane's bomb detonated and set off several fires. Although the fires were extinguished, seven men had been killed, thirty-three wounded and there were serious concerns for the integrity of the ship's hull. Maddox made her way back to Ulithi for repairs, and by May was back in the fight against Japan.

USS Hyman (DD-732) was patrolling five miles north of le Shima on 6 Apr 1945 when starting at 16:15 she was targeted by several kamikazes. Two of the attackers coordinated their attacks so that one plane caught most of the anti-aircraft fire on the starboard side, while the other plane approached from the portside. Hyman's gunners managed to shoot the wing off the incoming A6M "Zero" but the wreckage of the plane landed on the ship's forward torpedo launcher tubes between the stacks. A terrific explosion followed which created a large fire, and cooked off 40mm ammunition.

Anti-aircraft gunners on Hyman managed to shoot down several more approaching kamikazes (possibly including a German built Fw 190), while damage control brought the fires under control. Hyman suffered twelve dead and over forty wounded by the kamikaze strike, but luckily the ship managed to make for repairs at Saipan, then eventually back home.

USS Mannert L. Abele (DD-733) was patrolling radar picket duty off Okinawa on 12 April 1945 when she and her two escorts came under sustained attack by several kamikazes. Abele was able to avoid and shoot down several enemy planes but at 14:45, an A6M "Zero" crashed into the ship's starboard engine room. The plane's bomb detonated, knocking out all power in the ship, and possibly breaking the keel.

Around the same moment Abele was hit by the A6M, an incoming Mitsubishi G4M "Betty" bomber released a MXY-7 Ohka. The rocket powered suicide glider bomb; carrying a 2,600 lb. warhead in its nose, ignited its rocket boosters and accelerated towards the Abele at speeds in excess of five hundred miles per hour. The loss of power froze the main guns of the destroyer in place, leaving her helpless as the kamikaze missile slammed amidships. The tremendous explosion buckled the stricken Abele, breaking her in two. The ship immediately began to sink, taking the lives of eighty-four men down with her. Her survivors were strafed by remaining Japanese planes until escorts were able to rescue Abele's men from the water.

USS Purdy (DD-734) was patrolling some sixty miles off Okinawa on 12 April 1945 with USS Cassin Young (DD-793) when the ships and their escorts were attacked by a large formation of Japanese kamikazes. Defensive fire and Combat Air Patrol shot down or drove away most of the enemy planes, but a few managed to break through the gauntlet of fire. At 13:37, a kamikaze came in low on the water taking heavy fire; and despite the flaming airplane impacting the water before reaching the ship, momentum carried the bomb laden wreckage forward to crash into the starboard side. The bomb punched through the steel plating and exploded inside causing extensive damage, killing thirteen men. Another twenty seven crewmen were wounded during the action. Purdy left the area to make repairs and tend her wounded crew, eventually making it back to the states.

USS Drexler (DD-741) was patrolling radar picket duty off Okinawa with Lowry and four escort ships on 28 May 1945 when at 06:45, radar picked up six incoming Japanese planes. Although most of the planes were shot down, a damaged twin engine Yokosuka P1Y managed to strike Drexler on her starboard side between the main deck and the waterline. All steam has been cut off and burning gasoline was sprayed over the main deck of the ship. As Drexler came to a dead stop, another damaged P1Y "Frances" ominously circled the stricken destroyer three times before finally crashing into the ship's starboard side. The impact of kamikaze violently rolled Drexler on her beam, causing the destroyer to quickly take on water and rapidly sink. Less than a minute after the impact of the second plane, Drexler slipped beneath the sea, taking the lives of one hundred fifty eight men down with her, most of them trapped below decks. A further fifty-two were wounded by the attack.

USS Hugh W. Hadley (DD-774) was patrolling radar picket duty off Okinawa on 11 May 1945 along with the destroyer USS Evans (DD-552) and came under assault by the largest kamikaze swarm to attack a radar picket station; over one hundred fifty enemy planes. After both ships destroyed about twelve incoming bogeys, Evans took several direct hits and was dead in the water at 09:00, leaving Hadley to battle on by herself. Twenty minutes later, at least ten Japanese planes simultaneously approached the destroyer from several directions; although facing insurmountable odds, Hadley shot down all ten attackers.

Unfortunately she could not be spared from damage for the ship was hit by a bomb aft, a MXY-7 Ohka, a kamikaze crashed on her aft deck, and a third suicide plane struck the rigging of the ship. All crew with the exception of a fifty-man damage control party abandoned the ship into life rafts. Despite the flooding, fires, and heavy damage, Hadley was able to make it to le Shima under her own power. The crew of Hadley lost twenty-eight men and another sixty-seven wounded, but had shot down twenty-three enemy planes, including the ones who crashed into her. After being towed home to the states, it was determined the ship was too badly damaged to be returned to service.

USS Zellars (DD-777) was screening the battleship USS Tennessee (BB-43) on the afternoon of 12 April off Okinawa when at 14:50, three Nakajima B6N "Jill's" were sighted approaching low on the water from the port quarter. The first two kamikazes were shot down, but the third struck the port side of the ship; its 1,100 lb bomb punched through to explode adjacent to the plotting room. Zellars lost all power temporarily but damage control was able to put all fires out. The ship would limp to Kerama Retto with extensive damage and eventually back to the states. Zellars lost twenty-nine men killed and thirty-seven wounded by the kamikaze strike on 12 April.

USS Douglas H. Fox (DD-779) was patrolling radar picket duty with five other ships off Okinawa on 17 May 1945, when the Americans were attacked by several kamikazes at 19:26. Four Nakajima Ki-43 "Oscar's" began heading for Fox in a single file and were taken under fire from the ships. The first three were shot down, but the fourth and last in line crashed into No.1 and No.2 five-inch turrets, knocking out both and starting a large fire. The fire was extinguished quickly and the ship was able to make Kerama Retto for temporary repairs before arriving home on 23 June 1945.

USS Stormes (DD-780) was patrolling radar picket duty off Okinawa with six accompanying ships on 25 May 1945 when at 19:00 her crew spotted a Nakajima Ki-44 "Tojo" directly overhead making a speeding dive on USS Ammen (DD-527) steaming ahead. Suddenly the kamikaze rolled in a half loop and plunged perfectly straight down onto the Stormes at torpedo mount. The plane's bomb detonated in the No.3 five-inch turrets magazine, causing a devastating explosion which blew holes in the ship's hull, and started a massive inferno. Damage control teams fought to extinguish the blazes and stop all flooding through the night and by 12:00 the next day, Stormes carefully made her way to Kerama Retto and eventually Buckner Bay to be placed in floating dry dock. The ship arrived home in the US on 17 September 1945 for permanent repairs, and would serve again in both the Korean and Vietnam wars.

== Destroyer, escort vessel (DE) ==
USS Manlove (DE-36) was patrolling on picket duty off Okinawa on 11 April 1945 when she was attacked by a Japanese kamikaze. Despite taking tremendous damage from the ships defensive fire, the suicide plane impacted the ships side wounding nine and killing one. Luckily the damage to the ship did not compromise hull integrity and she was able to return for repairs, continuing her war service until July 1945.

USS Donaldson (DE-44) was sailing with Halsey’s Third Fleet on 17 December 1944 when Typhoon Cobra overtook the area. With enormous waves and windspeeds exceeding 150 mph at times, destroyer escorts such as Donaldson struggled in the malestrom as the ship was tossed about, sometimes rolling over 75 degrees which caused a loss of power and damaged equipment. Three men were lost overboard during the typhoon and were not recovered. The ship would be repaired at Ulithi and returned to service in January 1945.

USS Rall (DE-304) was covering a landing force and conducting anti-submarine duty off Okinawa on 12 April 1945, when her task force was attacked by fourteen waves of Japanese kamikazes. At approximately 13:33 a group of five planes attacked the destroyer escort, coming in from multiple sides to disperse defensive fire. Although four attackers were shot down, a single D3A "Val" flew in low only ten feet above the water and struck the ship on her starboard side just under the deck level. The planes bomb crashed completely through the ship to explode fifteen feet off the ships port side. Nearly simultaneously a Ki-43 "Oscar" was strafing the ship and hit depth charges on the stern which detonated, blowing several men overboard. After prompt and skillful damage control the ship was able to extinguish all fires. Twenty one crew had been killed and thirty-eight wounded. The ship was sent first to Ulithi and finally the states for repairs, finishing the war with three battle stars.

USS Halloran (DE-305) was performing anti-submarine duty off Okinawa on 21 June 1945 when at approximately 22:30 a lone Japanese aircraft made a strafing run on the ship which returned fire. The attacking plane was shot down and crashed 75 yards from the ship, however its ordnance exploded, showering the destroyer escort with shrapnel which killed three men and wounded twenty-four others. The damage did not endanger the Halloran and she returned to service after a couple weeks repairs at Kermara Retto.

USS Buckley (DE-51) was participating in a U-Boat Hunter Killer Task Group in the Atlantic near Cape Verde on 6 May 1944, when in the early morning hours the ship received a report of an enemy submarine less than 20 miles from her current location. Contact was established with U-66 at 0308, which fired two torpedoes but both missed. After twenty minutes of exchanging gunfire and closing range, Buckley rammed the German U-Boat at 0328, locking both vessels together for a short time. Both crews exchanged small arms fire and even threw kitchen utensils and dishes at one another. After several minutes the destroyer escort backed away from U-66 which itself then rammed the Buckley, breaking the ship's starboard propeller shaft. After this second collision, crew men on Buckley were able to toss grenades into the conning tower of the now flaming submarine that was starting to sink. Thirty-six German prisoners were taken and the ship returned to New York to repair her damaged propeller shaft. For her actions on 6 May 1944, the ships crew were rewarded with a combat star on their European-African Theater Ribbon (typically only bestowed to ground troops). Buckley would be sold for scrap in 1969.

USS Donnell (DE-56) was acting as escort for a convoy which was 450 miles south of Ireland on 3 May 1944 when at 12:00, the ship made sound contact and sighted the periscope of U-473. As the Donnel readied for depth charge attack, the Donnel was struck by a torpedo that detonated the ships depth charges and severed off the stern. Donnel was dead in the water and had to be towed from the area for repairs. She suffered twenty-nine killed and twenty-five wounded. Following its successful strike on the Donnel, U-473 was subsequently hunted down a few hours later by a responding Sub-Killer Task Force and depth charged to Davy Jones Locker.

USS Fogg (DE-57) was escorting a convoy to the East Coast on 20 November 1944 when an LST in the group was struck by a torpedo from U-870. Fogg began searching for the enemy submarine but unfortunately the ship was also hit by a torpedo. About forty feet of the ships stern was severed by the explosion killing fourteen men and wounding nineteen others. The ship struggled for days to stay afloat in heavy seas and evacuated all but a small skeleton crew. Luckily with the help of a tug boat, the Fogg as able to be towed back to Azores and finally Boston, but not before losing her temporary stern in route across the Atlantic. The ship was scrapped in 1966.

USS Bates (DE-68) was patrolling two miles south of Ie Shima, Okinawa when on 25 May 1945 at 11:15 Bates was attacked by three Japanese D3A "Val" dive bombers. The first dropped a bomb, scoring a near miss which ruptured the starboard hull of the ship, then crashed into the starboard side of the fantail. The second aircraft, almost simultaneously, crashed into the portside wheelhouse knocking out power and spreading gasoline fires. Shortly after, the third enemy plane made a bombing run scoring a near miss amidships portside, rupturing the hull and surrounding the ship with burning oil on the sea. At 11:45 the commanding officer ordered Bates abandoned. Twenty-one of her crew were either dead or missing from the attacks, and thirty-five were wounded. During the afternoon, the tug Cree was able to get a line aboard and towed Bates to Ie Shima anchorage. At 19:23, the still burning Bates capsized and sank in 120ft of water.

USS Blessman (DE-69) was acting as a high speed transport and returning from delivering Underwater Demolition Teams to the shore of Iwo Jima for beach reconnaissance on 18 February 1945 when at 21:21, the ship was attacked by a low flying G4M "Betty" twin engine bomber. The enemy plane released a string of bombs, one of which hit the Blessman near the ships mess hall and number one engine room. A large fire erupted in the ships mess hall and bomb damaged water lines forced the crew to fight the fire with water buckets handed down the line. Another destroyer came to assist with putting out the fires and evacuating the wounded, with their combined efforts the fires were brought under control. Forty men were killed, and twenty wounded by the attack. The ship would be towed to Saipian and eventually back to the states for permanent repair. She was finished just two days after V-J day. The ship was sold to Taiwan and served in the Republic of China Navy under the name Chung Shan until 1995.

USS Sims (DE-154) was serving on picket duty off Okinawa on 25 May 1945, when she was attacked by two kamikazes. The first was shot down but one plane managed to strike a glancing blow near the depth charge racks which started a fire and wounded eleven men. Damage was minimal and the fire was quickly extinguished, allowing Sims to continue on her mission. She would be repaired at Leyte after departing the area on the 27th. The Sims was scrapped in 1961.

USS Hopping (DE-155) was acting as a high speed transport and on screening duty off Okinawa near Nakagusuku Bay on 9 April 1945 when at 15:00 the ship came under fire from a Japanese shore battery. Hopping was hit by several shells which struck the hull forward, aft deck, the bridge, and started a fire. Power was knocked out and the ship came to a halt, but her main battery was able to return fire on the enemy gun. After a half hour of damage control, the fires were put out and Hopping had power restored and was able to limp away from the area. Luckily despite the damage the ship suffered no fatalities and only a few men were wounded. She was able to return to Ulithi for repairs on 29 April and returned to duty just a couple weeks later.

USS Fechteler (DE-157) was escorting a convoy through the Western Mediterranean on 5 May 1945 when at approximately 01:20, an incoming torpedo fired by U-967 hit the ship on the starboard side near the engine room. The detonation of the torpedo wrecked the midsection of the ship and knocked out all power. Despite the gallant actions of the crew, controlling the flooding proved to be impossible and at 01:40 the call to abandon ship went out. The Fechteler broke in two a few minutes later; sinking stern first and followed by the bow. Twenty-nine crew men were killed and twenty-six others wounded.

USS Chase (DE-158) was patrolling radar picket duty on 20 May 1945 off Okinawa when at 16:25 a lone Japanese kamikaze was spotted making a run at the Chase. The ship put up a fierce anti-aircraft barrage and shot down the diving suicide plane which hit the water and exploded just ten yards away from the destroyer escort. Shrapnel from the plane was sprayed alongside the hull and exposed areas of the ship causing equipment damage and twelve men to be wounded. A hole was also opened along the hull which flooded a few compartments but luckily the Chase was able to maintain buoyancy and was towed to Kermara Retto then later the states.

USS Loy (DE-160) was patrolling off Okinawa on 27 May 1945 when at approximately 13:00 an enemy plane was sighted off her starboard beam heading right at Loy. Anti-aircraft guns began to engage the target as it closed on the ship. Despite the heavy fire, the kamikaze slammed into the ship just aft of the forward gun turret on the starboard side causing a terrific explosion that caused substantial damage to the superstructure of the Loy. Twenty-one crew were killed and thirty were wounded by the strike. Prompt damage control was able to save the ship from further destruction and she was able to make her away out of the combat area under her own power. The ship would not return to action before the end of the war and was eventually scrapped in 1966.

USS Liddle (DE-206) was escorting a convoy in Leyte Gulf on 7 December 1944 when at approximately 13:00 an incoming strike of several Japanese kamikaze planes was spotted prompting her crew to man anti-aircraft stations. Although Liddle assisted splashing five attackers, one plane targeted the ships bridge and successfully made a direct hit causing a powerful explosion. The bridge and superstructure of the ship were severely damaged and engulfed in flames which spread through several compartments. The damage control teams were able to save the ship from total loss and extinguish the fires. Thirty-eight men were lost and another fifty-five were wounded. Liddle proceeded to a nearby port for temporary repairs and finally back to the states. The ship rejoined the war on 9 February 1945.

USS Foreman (DE-633) was on anti-submarine duty near Kermara Retto on 3 April 1945 when at approximately 11:20 the ship was targeted by several Japanese dive bombers. Despite putting up a fierce anti-aircraft barrage and driving away most of the attacking planes, one plane managed to brave the fire and dropped its (possibly a 250 lb) bomb which struck the ship forward portside near the bridge and main guns, then penetrated several decks before exploding. Several fires broke out and the ship started to flood due to a large hole in the blown out of the side. Luckily power was not completely knocked out and damage control was able to keep the situation from getting out of hand. Fortunately despite the damage, the Foreman suffered no fatalities and just a few wounded. The destroyer escort was able to get underway under her own power and return to Ulithi. She was back on station off Okinawa on 3 June 1945.

USS Whitehurst (DE-634) was conducting anti-submarine duty two miles off Kermara Retto on 12 April 1945 when at approximately 14:30 the ship was attacked simultaneously by three D3A "Val" dive bombers. The three enemy planes targeted the Whitehurst from multiple angles and two were shot down by fire from the destroyer escort, however the third plane which had been approaching from the portside a few feet above the water veered upwards just before impact to strike the ship's portside forward superstructure. The plane's momentum punched through the pilot house with such force it's 500 pound bomb exited the ship to explode in the sea off the ships starboard side. With her Command and Control center knocked out, the ship was burning heavily and circling out of control while the crew fought to contain the fierce fires. Fortunately the close proximity to Kermara Retto allowed nearby ships to lend assistance putting out fires on Whitehurst and the ship was able to reestablish control and make it for temporary repairs. Forty-two crewmen were killed and another twenty-two wounded by the kamikaze strike. The Whitehurst was able to make it back to Pearl Harbor under her own power, and survived the war to be sunk as a target ship in 1971.

== Submarine (SS) ==
USS R-12 (SS-89) was training new submariners in conducting a torpedo practice approach off Key West, Florida on 12 June 1943. The sub began to dive but suddenly the forward battery compartment rapidly began to flood. An order went out to blow main ballast but it was too late. In less than fifteen seconds, R-12 sank to the sea floor. The submarine's captain and four other men were washed off the conning tower as the boat sank and were later rescued. A fourteen-day search yielded no results and the R-12 was considered lost. Forty-two men went down with R-12 when she sank. Her wreck was rediscovered in 2011, but the exact cause of her sinking remains a mystery.

USS S-26 (SS-131) had just finished transiting the Panama Canal on the night of 24 January 1942 with three other submarines and the subchaser PC-460 acting as escort. Once outside the harbor of Balboa, Panama, PC-460 sent a visual message informing the escort was about turn around and return to port, but unfortunately only S-21 saw the signal. The subchaser turned and violently collided with S-26 starboard amidships, causing the submarine to roll over on its side and sink within a few seconds.

Only the captain, executive officer, and a lookout were rescued before the sub plunged beneath the sea. Over fifty rescue attempts were made by divers to reach men trapped inside the submarine, but all failed. Divers reported they could not hear any tapping from inside the hull, making it doubtful anyone survived the initial sinking. Forty-six men were lost with S-26.

USS S-27 (SS-132) was on her first and only patrol of the war to reconnoiter Kiska Island in the Aleutians on 19 June 1942. While recharging her engines on the surface in a heavy fog, the crew of the sub did not notice they had drifted five miles away from their dead reckoning position. At 00:43 the crew noticed waves breaking against rock just twenty-five yards forward of the bow and ordered "Back Emergency", but it was too late. Waves smashed the submarine against the rocks and violently rocked the crew around inside.

Efforts were made to free the boat off the rocks but all attempts failed. The crew sent out distress dispatches and began to abandon the sub at 03:30. By 11:00 only a skeleton crew remained on board. The crew set up camp in abandoned buildings at Constantine Harbor and would be rescued in days ahead. S-27 was stripped of all valuable equipment and left abandoned on the rocks where she grounded. Luckily, all of the submarine's crew was saved without serious injury.

USS S-28 (SS-133) was conducting a training exercise with the USCGC cutter Resilience (WPC-150) on 4 July 1944 off the western coast of Oahu, Hawaii, when at 17:30, S-28 dived to conduct a practice torpedo run four miles away from Resilience. The USCGC cutter detected the submarine by sound several times but the signal got more distant as time went on. By 18:20, signal had been completely lost with the sub. Resilience retraced her course trying to reestablish communication with S-28.

At no time was a distress signal sent out, nor did S-28 ever indicate there was an issue. At 20:00, the Coast Guard cutter contacted Pearl Harbor for help. A search of the area was undertaken until the afternoon of 6 July when a slick of diesel oil was found. It remains unknown to this day exactly why S-28 sank, but taken down with her were the lives of forty-nine men. The remains of the sub were discovered in 2017 off the coast of Oahu at a depth of eight thousand five hundred feet.

USS S-36 (SS-141) was proceeding to Surabaya, Java on her second patrol of the war when at 04:04 on 20 January 1942, the sub was transiting through the Makassar Strait and was grounded on the Taka Bakang Reef. The forward battery began to flood and filled with chlorine gas, prompting the commanding officer to call for help. A Dutch launch was dispatched from nearby Makassar City to pick up the crew off S-36. By 13:30, the last man to leave the sub rigged her to flood. Luckily nobody was killed or seriously wounded by the loss of S-36.

USS S-39 (SS-144) was on her fifth war patrol heading across the Coral Sea to the Louisiade Archipelago when late on the night of 13 August 1942, the submarine ran aground on rocks just off Rossel Island. Throughout the morning of 14 August, the crew valiantly tried to refloat their sub, but the list only increased as the boat continued to be slammed against rock by the swelling sea. The sub called for help and soon HMAS Katoomba was dispatched to assist. The entire crew was rescued and the submarine was abandoned after all sensitive documents had been destroyed.

USS S-44 (SS-155) was on her fifth patrol of the war the night of 7 October 1943, when at 20:30 the submarine picked up on radar what was presumed to be a small merchant ship. In fact, the small ship was a coastal defense vessel which quickly opened fire on the S-44, prompting the sub to start an emergency dive, but it was too late. The sub was perforated by shells all over, including below the waterline which started to flood the boat. The crew attempted to hoist a white flag of surrender but the Japanese vessel continued to fire at the S-44. Only two men were able to get out of the submarine alive before S-44 slipped beneath the waves. The two survivors would be forced to work as prisoners in brutal conditions until they were liberated after the war.

USS Argonaut (SM-1) was on her third patrol of the war along the south-east coast of New Britain Island when on 10 January 1943, she intercepted a convoy of enemy ships from Rabaul. A passing by American bomber witnessed Argonaut attack a column of escorting destroyers. The Japanese destroyers Isokaze and Maikaze first depth charged a reported enemy submarine, then noticed a bow popping above the waves and together blasted it with 5-inch (127 mm) gunfire until it sank. Argonaut took the lives of 105 officers and crew down with her, the worst loss of life for an American sub during the war.

USS Shark (SS-174) was on her second patrol of the war near the Philippines in February 1942. The sub had been reporting to Soerabaja, and patrolling the Strait of Malacca, and was to proceed to cover the passage east of the Bangka Strait. The Shark reported she had been attacked with depth charges about ten miles off Tifore Island on 2 February, and five days later informed base she was hunting a cargo ship heading northwest. This was would the last contact ever heard from Shark, as she was never seen again. The navy presumed the ship was lost on 7 March 1942.

Postwar analysis of Japanese records are inconclusive, but it is clear that several attacks on an Allied submarine were made in the area and time frame where Shark was assigned to operate. Because the submarine was ordered to northern Celebes, it is most likely Shark was sunk by the Japanese destroyer Yamakaze during a 10 minute long gunfight while the sub was surfaced at 01:30 on 11 February 1942 off Menado. Although survivors could be heard in the water, the Japanese destroyer did not bother to rescue anybody. Lost with the Shark were the lives of fifty four crew.

USS Perch (SS-176) was on her second patrol of the war when on 1 March 1942 when she attacked a Japanese convoy about thirty miles off Surabaya, Java. Two escorting enemy destroyers, the Amatsukaze and Hatsukaze, dropped depth charges on and crippled Perch. The sub surfaced hours later, only for the next day to be further left bordering on the line of sinking by depth charges from the destroyers Ushio and Sazanami. The sub resurfaced at dusk but found the damage sustained would prevent the sub from diving again. Soon thereafter,Ushio appeared and the commanding officer decided to scuttle his combat ineffective boat, and all fifty-nine crew members were taken prisoner by the Japanese. Five men would die during three and a half years of brutal treatment, but eventually fifty-four men from the Perch finally made it home.

USS Pickerel (SS-177) left Pearl Harbor on 18 March 1943 for her seventh patrol of the war, and arrived to top off fuel and supplies at Midway Island before heading to the north-eastern coast of Honshu. The submarine was never heard from again, and was listed as lost on 12 May 1943. Japanese records indicate the only submarine action occurring on 3 April, which was attacked with depth charges from destroyers and a plane until an oil slick developed. The certainty of this information remains in question, for Japanese records for April 1943 are notoriously inaccurate, and the reported position was out of Pickerel's assigned hunting grounds. It is possible the sub relocated after poor target availability, but the mystery of Pickerel and her fifty crewmen remains unsolved.

USS Pompano (SS-181) left Midway Island on 20 August 1943 bound for the coast of Hokkaidō and eastern Honshū. The submarine was never heard from again and presumed lost on 15 October 1943. For many years it was believed the sub was sunk by naval mines off the coast of Honshū, however recent evidence suggests the sub was sighted in the Shiriyasaki Sea and attacked on the surface by a patrol plane on 17 September. Depth charges were later dropped by several sub-hunting craft who observed oil or fuel floating on the water. This report is a mystery however as a Japanese cargo ship was attacked by a submarine on 25 September, eight days later. No other US submarine bedsides Pompano would have been operating in this area. The exact circumstances which led to loss of Pompano and her seventy-three crewmen remains unknown to this day.

USS Sculpin (SS-191) was on her ninth patrol of the war attempting to disrupt Japanese reinforcement of the Gilbert Islands before the Invasion of Tarawa when in the early morning of 19 November 1943, the submarine attacked a convoy of ships only to be fired on by the Japanese destroyer Yamagumo. Numerous salvos of depth charges damaged the sub enough to force it to the surface and attempt a gun battle, but was no match for the destroyers main battery. As the crew abandoned ship, Captain John P. Cromwell refused to leave his submarine out of fear he would be tortured by the Japanese into revealing information about the upcoming Tarawa landings; for his sacrifice he was posthumously awarded the Medal of Honor.

Including the captain, eleven crew went down with the Sculpin while forty-one survivors were picked up by the Yamagumo (one badly wounded man was thrown overboard by the Japanese). The survivors were transported to Japan on board different vessels, one of which was sunk by another US submarine, taking the lives of another twenty more Sculpin crewmen. The surviving twenty-one men had to work in copper mines for the rest of the war before finally being liberated.

USS Swordfish (SS-193) was conducting her thirteenth patrol of the war off Okinawa in preparation for the upcoming landings scheduled there for 1 April 1945. The sub reported it had received orders to avoid the Nansei-Shoto area on 3 January 1945. This would be the last message ever received from Swordfish as she never responded or returned to port again. On the morning of 12 January; submarine USS Kete (SS-369) made sonar contact with what they believed was another submarine, and four hours later could hear heavy depth charging in the area the sonar contact was made. This incident was regarded by the Navy as the destruction of the Swordfish, and indeed the escort ship CH-4 attacked a submarine near that location.

USS Sealion (SS-195) was undergoing an overhaul in the Cavite Naval Yard near Manila when on 10 December 1941, the base was attacked by land based Japanese bombers from Taiwan. The docked submarine was hit by two bombs, one hit the subs conning tower and exploded outside the hull, while the second bomb struck a ballast tank and caused an explosion in the aft engine room which killed four men. The ship took on water and settled in the dock, her stern underwater. The damage inflicted to the naval yard made repairs an impossibility, so orders were given to salvage any valuable equipment and destroy the sub. On 25 December, Sealion was destroyed by explosives set inside her hull to prevent the Japanese from using her. Another member of her crew would perish in a Japanese administered POW camp.

USS Seawolf (SS-197) was on her fifteenth patrol of the war; carrying Army personnel to Samar in preparation for the upcoming Liberation of the Philippines. Seawolf exchanged radar recognition signals with the submarine USS Narwhal (SS-167) at 0756 on the morning of 3 October off the island of Morotai, but was never heard from again. There are no Japanese records of attacks on submarines listed for the area and dates when Seawolf disappeared.

Evidence suggests that the Seawolf may have been the victim of friendly fire, as the destroyer escort USS Richard M. Rowell (DE-403) attacked and dropped depth charges on what the crew believed to be a Japanese submarine which had just sunk USS Shelton (DE-407) not far from Morotai Island, however the Japanese submarine in the area had been able to escape unscathed. On board the Seawolf when she was lost were eighty-three crew and an additional seventeen Army passengers, the exact circumstances of their disappearance is unknown to this day.

USS Triton (SS-201) was on her sixth patrol of the war near the Papua, New Guinea area when on 15 March 1943 the submarine reported that it had attacked a Japanese convoy but was pursued by depth charge dropping destroyers. The Triton was never heard from again after this last message. Japanese records indicate a series of depth charges made by the Japanese destroyers Samidare and Satsuki and the submarine chasers CH-22 and CH-24 in the area where Triton was operating. The ships reported an oil slick, and debris with English markings floating on the surface where the submarine had been previously sighted. The sub was reported as presumed lost by the navy on 10 April 1943. Seventy-four men were lost with the Triton.

USS Trout (SS-202) topped off for fuel at Midway Island on 16 February 1944 and headed out towards the East China Sea for her eleventh patrol of the war. The submarine was never seen nor heard from again. Japanese records examined post war reveal that on 29 February 1944, a Japanese convoy of troop transports was attacked by an American submarine, right in the area Trout was assigned to operate. The submarine sank a troop ship, and severely crippled a second transport before the Asashimo maneuvered to drop nineteen depth charges. Debris and oil were then observed to float to the surface where the charges were dropped, enough to convince the Japanese they had sunk the submarine. Eighty-one crewmen were lost with Trout.

USS Grampus (SS-207) was on her sixth patrol of the war hunting Japanese convoys accompanied by USS Grayback (SS-208) in the waters near Vella Gulf on 5 March 1943. Exactly what happened to the submarine is a mystery, but she was never heard from again. From available information culled together after the war, it is most likely that Grampus was caught on the surface the night of 5 March 1943, and was sunk by gunfire from Japanese destroyers Minegumo and Murasame passing through Blackett Strait where the sub was supposed to be operating. The Japanese destroyers were later sunk in the Battle of Vella Gulf, so no discernable report was made describing the sinking of a submarine, however an oil slick was reported in the Blackett Strait on 6 March by Japanese sources. Repeated attempts to contact the Grampus went unanswered, and the sub was presumed lost with all hands 22 March 1943.

USS Grayback (SS-208) was on her way home from her tenth patrol of the war, which had seen the sub sink four cargo vessels and damage two more. On 26 February 1944, the submarine was spotted by a Nakajima B5N which attacked. The pilot reported the submarine "exploded and sank immediately", but anti-submarine boats were summoned to the area to depth charge the stricken vessel, and finally a huge oil slick developed on the surface indicating the demise of Grayback. The sub was reported as missing and presumed lost on 30 March 1944. The wreckage of the Grayback was discovered fifty miles south of Okinawa in 2019. Damage to the wreck indicates the sub was indeed struck by a large aerial bomb.

USS Grayling (SS-209) was on her eighth patrol of the war patrolling near the approaches to Manila. The sub reported it had sunk a passenger-cargo ship in the Talbas Strait on 27 August 1943; this was the final message received from the Grayling. Japanese records report a sighting of a submarine which freighter-transport Hokuan Maru may have rammed in Lingayen Gulf on 9 September. Although possible, researchers believe this was too far from where Grayling was assigned to operate.

No additional information is available. There are no known Japanese reports of a submarine being sunk in the areas and time frame Grayling disappeared. Her scheduled report to chain of command on the twelfth never occurred and the sub was never seen or heard from again. The fate of the Grayling and her seventy-six crew remain a mystery as of today.

USS Grenadier (SS-210) was on her sixth patrol of the war on 21 April 1943, running on the surface at dawn near the Strait of Malacca when the sub was spotted by a Japanese patrol plane. Although Grenadier dived quickly, it was not deep enough to avoid the plane's two bombs which rocked the submarine considerably. All power was lost and the sub sank to the sea floor under two-hundred seventy feet of water. The sub sat on the sea floor for thirteen hours making repairs before finally making it back to the surface to get fresh air and clear smoke out of the submarine. It became clear the propulsion system of Grenadier was wrecked and the sub was stranded in enemy waters.

The crew attempted to rig a sail to move the sub closer to land, but unfortunately two Japanese boats appeared and soon took all of the subs crew prisoner after Grenadier was abandoned. The submarine crew had to endure several years of brutal, sadistic abuse as captives of the Japanese, but out of seventy-six men taken prisoner when Grenadier sank, four men did not return home. The wreck of the submarine was rediscovered in 2020.

USS Gudgeon (SS-211) set off for her twelfth patrol of the war on 4 April 1944, stopping for fuel at Johnston Island before proceeding to the northern Marianas Islands area. The sub was never heard from again, and the Navy reported the sub was presumed to be lost with all hands on 7 June 1944. A report from the Japanese stated on 18 April 1944 that two patrol planes attacked and possibly sunk an American submarine one hundred sixty six miles southeast of Iwo Jima.

USS Growler (SS-215) was on her eleventh patrol of the war on 8 November 1944 when she attempted to attack a Japanese convoy. However, 3 of the convoy's escorts - the famed destroyer Shigure and escort ships Chiburi and CD-19 - unleashed a flurry of depth charges which sank the submarine with all hands lost.

USS Grunion (SS-216) was on her first patrol near Kiska, Alaska on 30 July 1942; reporting she had been engaged by enemy destroyers and there was heavy anti-submarine activity near the island. Grunion was never heard from again, and never returned to port. The navy reported the Grunion was presumed lost with all hands on 5 Oct 1942. However, after the war, Japanese records did not report sinking a submarine near Kiska when the submarine disappeared.

The mystery of the Grunion was solved when the submarine's wreckage was found in the area she disappeared in 2006. It is believed the sub suffered a depth control malfunction after one its own torpedoes circled back to strike the sub, which led to Grunion sinking and imploding.

USS Albacore (SS-218) topped off her fuel at Midway Island on 28 October 1944 before heading out on her eleventh patrol of the war. The submarine was never heard from again, and was presumed to be lost with all sixty men on 21 December 1944. Japanese records indicate she struck a mine off the shore of Hokkaido which was witnessed by a patrol boat.

During her career, Albacore set the record for most tonnage ever sunk by a single submarine, and most combat ships sunk at thirteen. Her biggest prize included Japanese aircraft carrier Taiho during the Battle of the Philippine Sea.

USS Amberjack (SS-219) was on her third patrol of the war near the traffic routes of the Rabaul-Shortland Sea area, when she made a final radio transmission on 14 February 1943, reporting she had picked up an enemy aviator, and had been forced down by two tailing destroyers. Amberjack was never heard from again, as all sent messages to the sub went unanswered and she never returned to base. The sub and her sixty crew were presumed lost on 22 March 1943.

After the war, captured Japanese records show on 16 February 1943, Japanese torpedo boat ''Hiyodori'' and a subchaser dropped depth charges on a submarine approximately sixty miles south of Rabaul. Wreckage and an oil slick developed and the Japanese assumed the vessel had been destroyed. These ships may have sunk the submarine USS Grampus (SS-207), which also went missing in the same area, however most evidence points to the 16 February sinking as the Amberjack.

USS Bonefish (SS-223) was on her eighth patrol of the war in the Sea of Japan, off the western coast of Honshu conducting offensive operations in June 1945. On the 16th, Bonefish reported having sunk a 6,800 ton cargo ship and two days later was given permission to conduct a daytime patrol near Toyama Bay. Neither the submarine nor any of her crew were ever seen again. The sub failed to make the scheduled rendezvous with USS Tunny and was officially declared lost on July 30, 1945. Post war examination determined that Bonefish was most likely sunk with all hands on June 18 near Toyama Wan after making a successful torpedo attack on a Japanese cargo ship. Escorting vessels attacked the American submarine with depth charges until wood chips and oil came to the surface.

USS Corvina (SS-226) left Pearl Harbor on her maiden voyage on 4 November 1943, stopped at Johnson Island on the 6th to off her fuel tanks then proceeded to Truk for her first combat patrol. The submarine was never seen or heard from again by friendly forces. It is believed that Corvina was sunk with all eighty-two of her crew by Japanese submarine I-176 who reported sinking an American sub south-west of Truk on 16 November. If being the case, Corvina was the only US sub sunk by another enemy submarine during the Second World War.

USS Darter (SS-227) was conducting her fourth patrol of the war near Palawan on 23 October 1944 when just after midnight, a huge fleet of Japanese battleships and cruisers appeared on the submarine's radar. In the opening attack of the famous Battle of Leyte Gulf, Darter attacked and sunk the heavy cruiser Atago with four torpedoes, which turned out to be Admiral Kurita's flagship of the Center Force. The American submarine also hit and seriously damaged Takao. Darter pursued the damaged cruiser until at 0005 on 24 October when the submarine ran aground on Bombay Shoal. All attempts to dislodge the boat failed and her crew was taken off by accompanying submarine Dace without casualties. The Darter refused to die after a failed scuttling and was abandoned to the elements after it was determined she would be of no value to the enemy. The submarine's wreck was broken up by naval bombing practice and still sits where she ran aground in 1944, albeit in decaying ruins.

USS Herring (SS-233) went out from Midway Island for her eighth patrol of the war on 21 May 1944, then ten days later made rendezvous with USS Barb (SS-220) before heading off to the Kuril Islands. The submarine was never heard from again. Postwar analysis of Japanese records conclude that Herring had sunk two ships on 30–31 May near Matua Island, and on the morning of 1 June she sunk two additional Japanese cargo ships which were anchored near the island. Shore batteries spotted the surfaced submarine and were able to hit Herring numerous times with shell fire. The American submarine disappeared beneath the sea leaving behind bubbles and an oil slick which stretched for over fifteen miles. All sixty of her men were lost. The submarine's wreck was discovered in 2016 near Matua Island.

USS Trigger (SS-237) was on her twelfth patrol of the war in the East China Sea hunting cargo ships in March 1945. The submarine reported attacking a convoy on 20 March one hundred twenty miles northeast of Okinawa, close to an area which had been restricted to US subs due to its heavy presence of mines. Trigger was ordered to join a wolf pack of nearby subs on the 26th, which the submarine never acknowledged. Trigger transmitted a routine weather report that same day, but was never seen or heard from again. By 1 May 1945, the submarine and her crew of sixty men were considered lost. Postwar records indicate Japanese anti-submarine planes, and escort vessels attacked an American sub in the area on 28 March until a large oil slick appeared.

USS Wahoo (SS-238) left Midway Island on 13 September for her seventh patrol of the war, heading for the Sea of Japan to hunt cargo ships. The famous and decorated submarine was never seen or heard from again. Japanese radio reported on 11 October 1943, an American submarine was passing through La Pérouse Strait and came under a sustained attack by the submarine chasers CH-15 and CH-43, assisted by three E13A1 Jakes, for several hours until oil and debris came to the surface. Wahoo had been the only US submarine operating in the area at the time. In 2006, the Wahoo was found by a team of divers resting in two-hundred feet of water near the La Pérouse Strait.

USS Dorado (SS-248) was a newly commissioned submarine which had just completed sea trials and left Connecticut on 6 October 1943 en route to Panama to begin her service in the war. The submarine was never seen or heard from again and the cause of her loss has never conclusively been determined. It is possible the submarine was sunk by a patrolling American anti-submarine plane, but the crew of plane reported the submarine they attacked had structural features which were certainly only of German design, and was too far off course from where Dorado was scheduled to operate. The fate of Dorado remains unsolved.

USS Flier (SS-250) was on her second patrol of the war transiting on the surface through the Balabac Strait the night of 12 August 1944 when at 22:00 the submarine struck a naval mine. The sub quickly sank in less than a minute but fifteen men were able to escape the stricken boat. Eight men were able to make their way ashore on Byan Island after more than seventeen hours in the water, where the crewmembers made contact with Filipino guerrillas. The eight survivors of the Flier escaped back home onboard the submarine Redfin. Fifty-two men were lost with Flier.

USS Harder (SS-257) disembarked on her sixth patrol of the war in company with two other submarines on 5 August 1944 to hunt Japanese shipping in the South China Sea off Luzon. In company with sister submarine Hake, the two subs had broken away from a wolf pack and were heading to patrol near Dasol Bay when on 24 August around 0455, contact was made with two Japanese escort ships (one of which was possibly the captured Clemens class destroyer USS Stewart) who turned to attack. Hake reported having dove down and making evasive maneuvers to avoid colliding with both Harder and the oncoming Japanese ships. As Hake was diving into the depths around 0725, the distant sounds of several underwater explosions to her stern could be heard and it was assumed Harder had been depth charged by the enemy warships. Hake was able to escape and return to the same area several hours later hoping to reestablish contact with Harder, but the submarine and her crew of sixty men were never seen or heard from again. Japanese records examined postwar indicate the patrol ship PB-102 (formerly the destroyer USS Stewart) ran into USS Harder, which prompted the escort vessel CD-22 to depth charge and sink Harder.

USS Robalo (SS-273) headed out on her third patrol of the war from Fremantle, Australia on 22 June 1944 to hunt Japanese shipping in the South China Sea. The submarine was scheduled to pass through the heavily mined Balabac Strait south of Palawan before heading to the Natuna Islands. On 2 July 1944, Robalo made a report of sighting a Japanese Fusō-class battleship with escorts, but the submarine was never seen or heard from again after this final message. The ship suffered an explosion in her after battery after hitting a mine, and four crew members survived, Howerver, they were later murdered by Japanese guards in response to an allied air strike on Palawan.

USS Runner (SS-275) left Midway Island on 28 May 1943 for her third patrol of the war, heading towards the Japanese home islands of Hokkaido and the northern tip of Honshu for a month long hunt. However the submarine was never heard from again, and Japanese records studied post-war have been unable to determine the cause for the loss of Runner. The only discernable information available proposes that Runner had sunk a cargo ship on 11 June 1943 near Hokkaido, and had been attacked by Japanese escort ships on 22 June 1943, but no oil slick or debris had been reported. A second cargo ship had exploded and sunk near the Kuril Islands on either 26 or 29 June (records list both dates), but the Japanese listed the sinking as due to "unknown causes". The most likely cause for the loss of the Runner is that she struck a mine and sank with all hands sometime after 22 June 1943. Her fate remains unsolved.

USS Scamp (SS-277) left Midway Island on her eighth patrol of the war on 16 October 1944 to hunt Japanese shipping near the Bonin Islands. The submarine was ordered to change her patrol area north of Iwo Jima on 9 November which she acknowledged. The submarine was then ordered to provide rescue services for downed B-29 bomber crews on their return trip back to the Marianas Islands, however Scamp never responded to any transmissions again, and never returned to port. A post war evaluation of Japanese records could not conclusively determine on precisely which date Scamp was sunk; however there are three incidents that were recorded as attacks on submarines near the vicinity of where Scamp was operating at the time.

The most likely incident which caused the loss of Scamp occurred on 11 November 1944 just north of Iwo Jima, when a Japanese patrol plane led the escort ship CD-4 to a trail of oil which was then heavily depth charged until a larger slick appeared on the water. No other sub besides for Scamp should have been in the area. Two other attacks on submarines were recorded by the Japanese in the area on 16 November which were not reported by any American sub, however it is unlikely these were made on Scamp if the submarine had been previously damaged as reported by the Japanese on 11 November. The cause for the loss of the Scamp and her sixty man crew remains unsolved.

USS Scorpion (SS-278) topped off fuel at Midway Island on 3 January 1944, then headed out for her fourth patrol of the war. On 5 January the sub reported a crewman had been injured with a broken foot and requested the friendly sub Herring near-by make the exchange. Afterwards Scorpion departed to patrol the East China Sea and the Yellow Sea, from which the sub was not seen or heard from ever again. There are no records of attacks on American submarines in the area and time frame where Scorpion disappeared, however it is known that the Japanese coastal navy had placed several lines of underwater mines near her assigned hunting grounds only days before the sub was scheduled to arrive. The Scorpion was declared lost on 6 March 1944 and has never been found.

USS Snook (SS-279) headed out from Guam on 28 March 1945 for her ninth patrol of the war. The last known communication between Snook and friendly forces was on 8 April, after which the submarine and her crew disappeared and were never seen or heard from again. It is difficult to determine exactly when the submarine went missing as there was a several day period which the Snook was not required to acknowledge orders. It was determined the sub was missing after she failed to turn up to a downed pilot in her assigned location on 20 April 1945. Snook was probably sunk by the escort vessels Okinawa, CD-8, CD-32, and CD-52. In 1995, a possible wreck of a submarine was located off Iriomote Island at a depth over a thousand feet by a group of deep-sea divers with sonar equipment, but whether or not it is the Snook has not been verified since.

USS Tullibee (SS-284) was on her fifth patrol of the war near Palau Islands when on 25 March 1944 her crew sighted a Japanese convoy of six ships. After trailing the convoy for several hours, the Tullibee fired two torpedoes at a target and waited for the expected detonations. Unfortunately, one of the torpedoes malfunctioned and made a perfect turn around to hit Tullibee amidships in a violent explosion. Only a single man survived the sinking to be captured by the Japanese and held as a POW until the end of the war.

USS Capelin (SS-289) left Darwin, Australia on 17 November 1943 for her second patrol of the war to hunt Japanese shipping around the Philippine Islands. On 9 Dec, Capelin was seen by friendly submarine Blowfish and acknowledged a message confirming her identity, but this would be the last time the submarine was ever seen or heard from again. Postwar analysis of Japanese records found that attacks on American submarines were reported in the areas where Capelin was assigned to operate. Recent research has suggested the Japanese laid lines of fresh mines out across areas where Capelin should have been operating at the time. The fate of Capelin remains unknown.

USS Cisco (SS-290) set out for her first patrol of the war from Darwin, Australia on 20 September 1943 heading to hunt Japanese commerce shipping in the Sulu Sea. The submarine and her crew were never seen again. Postwar analysis of Japanese records conclude that on 28 September, an American submarine was repeatedly attacked by the gunboat Karatsu - formerly the USS Luzon - until a large oil slick and debris appeared on the ocean surface. Cisco was the only US sub operating in the area at the time this report was made, leaving little doubt over her demise. Cisco took eighty crewmen down with her when she sank.

USS Escolar (SS-294) set out on 18 September 1944 from Midway Island for her first patrol of the war. The sub was assigned to patrol the Yellow Sea and sink Japanese shipping. On 30 September, Escolar transmitted a partial message which indicated she had been engaged by an enemy gunboat. No other discernable information about this incident has been recorded. The last communication made with Escolar was when she sent a routine report detailing her course and position, after which the submarine and her crew were never seen or heard from again. When the sub failed to return from patrol by 27 November 1944; she was declared lost. Postwar analysis of Japanese records indicate an American submarine was attacked on 19 October 1944 by a Japanese escort which dropped 30 depth charges and observed a large oil slick and debris on the ocean surface. As the only US submarine assigned to be operating in the area on that date, it is most likely Escolar was sunk by this attack.

USS Tang (SS-306) left Midway Island on 24 September 1944 headed for the Formosa Strait. Tang declined an invitation to join a wolf pack of submarines patrolling off Formosa (modern day Taiwan), and instead ventured to hunt alone. Neither the submarine or her crew were heard from again for the rest of the war. Postwar it was revealed that Tang was preparing to head home after another highly successful patrol when on 24 October 1944, the crew sighted a Japanese convoy and fired their final torpedo which immediately malfunctioned and circled back around. Despite their best efforts to evade, Tang was hit by her own torpedo and quickly began sinking. The sub settled on the sea floor in 180 feet of water with thirty survivors crammed into the bow torpedo room, of which thirteen were able to make it out of the sunken Tang to the surface. Later on the 25th, a Japanese frigate picked up nine survivors of the Tang's crew, including her commanding officer and five men who had swum to the surface after the initial sinking. A total of seventy-eight men were lost with Tang. In her five patrols she sank a record thirty-three ships.

USS Shark (SS-314) was on her third patrol of the war hunting Japanese shipping near the Luzon Strait when on 24 October 1944, the Shark reported to nearby American they were preparing to attack an enemy freighter. This was to be the last message received from the submarine as she was never seen or heard from again. Japanese records examined postwar revealed that Shark had most likely sunk the "hell ship" freighter she had been stalking Arisan Maru (which had been holding over 1,700 Allied POW) shortly after sending her last message. Japanese destroyer Harukaze came to assist the stricken freighter and attacked the submerged American sub until oil, bubbles, and debris came to the surface, leaving few doubts about the fate of the Shark and her eighty-seven crewmen.

USS Barbel (SS-316) was on her fourth patrol of the war covering approaches to Balabac Strait with an attack group of three other submarines. On 3 February 1945, Barbel sent out a message reporting to her nearby wolfpack that she had been attacked on three occasions by Japanese submarine hunting aircraft. The submarine was never heard from again and was reported as lost by the Navy on 16 February 1945. An examination of Japanese records after the war discovered that a Japanese plane had made an attack on an American submarine with two bombs with at least one hitting the conning tower. The submarine; most likely Barbel, disappeared under the waves in flames and smoke. A slick of oil appeared as the sub went down making almost certain the she did not survive.

USS Bullhead (SS-332) was on her third patrol of the war near Bali when on 6 August 1945 the submarine reported she had made her way through the Lombok Strait en route to a rendezvous with a wolfpack in the Java Sea. However by 15 August, Bullhead had not arrived at her scheduled position nor was her crew responding to any attempts to communicate by her fellow submarines. On 24 August, the Navy reported Bullhead as missing and presumed lost. It is assumed that Bullhead was sunk by a Japanese anti-submarine plane on 6 August 1945 who reported sinking an Allied submarine after two direct bomb hits. If correct, it would make Bullhead possibly the last American ship sunk by enemy action in the Second World War.

USS Golet (SS-361) left Midway Island on 28 May 1944 heading out for waters off Northern Honshu on her third patrol of the war. The submarine was never seen or heard from again after leaving Midway, and was reported as "presumed lost" on 26 July 1944. Postwar analysis of Japanese records conclude that the most likely cause of Golet's loss came on 14 June 1944 when the gunboat Miya Maru and auxiliary sub-chaser Bunzan Maru depth charged an American submarine until a large slick of oil, debris, and cork floated to the surface. All eighty-two crewmen of the Golet were lost with the sub.

USS Kete (SS-369) had been sinking Japanese cargo freighters west of Tokara Retto when on 19 March 1945 she had been ordered to return to Midway Island to refuel and then to Pearl Harbor for a refit which the submarine acknowledged. The following day the submarine sent a routine weather report, and was never heard from again. The sub never arrived back at base and repeated attempts to contact her crew went unanswered. By 16 April 1945, the Kete had been reported as missing by the Navy. Postwar analysis of Japanese records proved to be inconclusive as there were no reports of attacks on US submarines in the area, and the circumstances surrounding the loss of mystery Kete has eluded history (although she may have struck a mine). It's sometimes said that the Japanese submarine Ro-41 sank Kete, but her records do not support this.

USS Lagarto (SS-371) was on her ninth patrol of the war hunting a Japanese convoy in company with the submarine USS Baya (SS-318) in the Gulf of Thailand on 3 May 1945. The two submarine captains agreed to position themselves ahead of the convoy for a better attack angle after a brief gunfight with escorting vessels had driven the two subs away. The Baya arrived at her agreed upon location and after failing to reach the Lagarto for over a half hour decided to attack alone which yielded no success. The Lagarto was never seen or heard from again. Postwar Japanese records revealed that during the same engagement with Baya, escorting Japanese minelayer Hatsutaka dropped depth charges on a submerged submarine which most likely was the Lagarto.

== Mine warfare vessels ==
=== Mine layer (CM) ===
USS Miantonomah (CM-10) sunk by a mine off Le Havre, France, 25 September 1944.

=== Light mine layer (DM) ===
USS Gamble (DM-15) damaged by aircraft bombs off Iwo Jima, Volcano Islands, 18 February 1945, and scuttled off Saipan, Mariana Islands, 16 July 1945.

USS Montgomery (DM-17) scrapped after being damaged by a mine off Palau, Caroline Islands, 17 October 1944.

=== Mine sweeper, high-speed (DMS) ===
USS Emmons (DMS-22) sunk after being hit by five kamikaze aircraft off Okinawa, Ryukyu Islands, 6 April 1945.

USS Hovey (DMS-11) sunk after being torpedoed by Japanese aircraft in Lingayen Gulf, Luzon, Philippine Islands, 6 January 1945.

USS Long (DMS-12) sunk by kamikaze attack in Lingayen Gulf, Luzon, Philippine Islands, 6 January 1945.

USS Palmer (DMS-5) sunk by Japanese aircraft in Lingayen Gulf, Luzon, Philippine Islands, 7 January 1945.

USS Perry (DMS-17) sunk by a mine off Palau, Caroline Islands, 13 September 1944.

USS Wasmuth (DMS-15) sunk by explosion of depth charges during a gale off Aleutian Islands, 29 December 1942.

=== Mine sweeper (AM) ===
USS Bittern (AM-36) Sunk by aircraft bombs at Cavite, Luzon, Philippine Islands, 10 December 1941.

USS Finch (AM-9) sunk by Japanese aircraft off Corregidor, Luzon, Philippine Islands, 11 April 1942.

USS Minivet (AM-371) sunk by a mine in Tsushima Strait, Japan, 29 December 1945.

USS Osprey (AM-56) sunk by a mine off Normandy, France, 5 June 1944.

USS Penguin (AM-33) sunk by Japanese aircraft off Guam, Marianas Islands, 8 December 1941.

USS Portent (AM-106) sunk by a mine off Anzio, Italy, 22 January 1944.

USS Quail (AM-15) scuttled off Corregidor, Luzon, Philippine Islands, 6 May 1942.

USS Salute (AM-294) sunk by a mine off Brunei, Borneo, 8 June 1945.

USS Sentinel (AM-113) sunk by German aircraft off Licata, Sicily, 12 July 1943.

USS Skill (AM-115) sunk after being torpedoed by German submarine U-593 south of Capri, Italy, 25 September 1943.

USS Skylark (AM-63) sunk by a mine off Okinawa, Ryukyu Islands, 28 March 1945.

USS Swallow (AM-65) sunk after being hit by a single kamikaze aircraft off Okinawa, Ryukyu Islands, 22 April 1945.

USS Swerve (AM-121) sunk by a mine off Anzio, Italy, 9 July 1944.

USS Tanager (AM-5) sunk by shore batteries off Corregidor, Luzon, Philippine Islands, 4 May 1942.

USS Tide (AM-125) sunk by a mine off Normandy, France, 7 June 1944.

=== Mine sweeper, coastal (AMc) ===
USS Bunting (AMc-7) sunk by collision in San Francisco Bay, California, 3 June 1942.

USS Crow (AMc-20) sunk by erratic running aircraft torpedo in Puget Sound, Washington, 23 August 1943.

USS Hornbill (AMc-13) sunk after collision with the lumber schooner Esther Johnson in San Francisco Bay, California, 30 June 1942.

USS Valor (AMc-108) sunk in collision with USS Richard W. Suesens (DE-342) off Cuttyhunk Island, Buzzard's Bay, Massachusetts, 29 June 1944.

=== Auxiliary motor mine sweeper (YMS) ===
USS YMS-14 sunk in collision in Boston harbor, Massachusetts, 11 January 1945.

USS YMS-19 sunk by a mine off Palau, Caroline Islands, 24 September 1944.

USS YMS-21 sunk by a mine off Toulon, France, 1 September 1944.

USS YMS-24 sunk by a mine off St. Tropez, France, 15 August 1944.

USS YMS-30 sunk by a mine off Anzio, Italy, 25 January 1944.

USS YMS-39 sunk by a mine off Balikpapan, Borneo, 26 June 1945.

USS YMS-48 sunk by shore batteries in Manila Bay, Luzon, Philippine Islands, 14 February 1945.

USS YMS-50 sunk by a mine off Balikpapan, Borneo, 18 June 1945.

USS YMS-70 foundered off Leyte, Philippine Islands, 17 October 1944.

USS YMS-71 sunk by a mine off Brunei, Borneo, 3 April 1945.

USS YMS-84 sunk by a mine off Balikpapan, Borneo, 8 July 1945.

USS YMS-98 sunk off Okinawa, Ryukyu Islands, 16 September 1945.

USS YMS-103 sunk by a mine off Okinawa, Ryukyu Islands, 8 April 1945.

USS YMS-127 sunk in the Aleutian Islands, 10 January 1944.

USS YMS-133 foundered off Coos Bay, Oregon, 21 February 1943.

USS YMS-304 sunk by a mine off Normandy, France, 30 July 1944.

USS YMS-341 sunk off Okinawa, Ryukyu Islands, 16 September 1945.

USS YMS-350 sunk by a mine off Normandy, France, 2 July 1944.

USS YMS-365 sunk by a mine off Balikpapan, Borneo, 26 June 1945.

USS YMS-378 sunk by a mine off Normandy, France, 30 July 1944.

USS YMS-385 sunk by a mine off Ulithi, Caroline Islands, 1 October 1944.

USS YMS-409 foundered in the North Atlantic, 12 September 1944.

USS YMS-421 sunk off Okinawa, Ryukyu Islands, 16 September 1945.

USS YMS-472 sunk off Okinawa, Ryukyu Islands, 16 September 1945.

USS YMS-481 sunk by shore batteries off Tarakan, Borneo, 2 May 1945.

== Patrol ships ==
=== Gunboat (PG) ===
USS Asheville (PG-21) sunk by yjr Japanese destroyers Nowaki and Arashi south of Java, Netherlands East Indies, 3 March 1942.

USS Erie (PG-50) torpedoed by German submarine U-163 off Curacao Island, 12 November 1942, and capsized while under tow off Willemstad, Netherlands Antilles, 5 December 1942.

USS Plymouth (PG-57) sunk after being torpedoed by German submarine U-566 off North Carolina, 5 August 1943.

USS St. Augustine (PG-54) sunk after collision with S.S. Camas Meadows off Cape May, New Jersey, 6 January 1944.

=== Motor gunboat (PGM) ===
USS PGM-7 sunk in collision in the Bismarck Sea, 18 July 1944.

USS PGM-17 destroyed by grounding off Okinawa, Ryukyu Islands, 4 May 1945.

USS PGM-18 sunk by a mine off Okinawa, Ryukyu Islands, 7 April 1945.

USS PGM-27 destroyed by grounding during typhoon at Buckner Bay, Okinawa, Ryukyu Islands, 9 October 1945.

=== Eagle (PE) ===
USS PE-56 sunk by German submarine U-853 off Portland, Maine, 23 April 1945.

=== River gunboat (PR) ===
USS Luzon (PR-7) scuttled off Corregidor, Luzon, Philippine Islands, 6 May 1942, later raised and fitted for Japanese service.

USS Mindanao (PR-8) sunk by Japanese aircraft off Corregidor, Luzon, Philippine Islands, 5 May 1942.

USS Oahu (PR-6) scuttled off Corregidor, Luzon, Philippine Islands, 6 May 1942.

USS Wake (PR-3) captured at Shanghai, China, 7 December 1941.

=== Motor torpedo boat (PT) ===
PT-22 scrapped after being badly damaged in a storm at Dora Harbor, Alaska, 11 June 1943.

PT-28 damaged beyond repair in a storm at Dora Harbor, Alaska, 12 January 1943.

PT-31 grounded in enemy waters and destroyed to prevent capture, Subic Bay, Luzon, Philippine Islands, 19 January 1942.

PT-32 destroyed to prevent capture, Tagauayan Island, Philippine Islands, 13 March 1942.

PT-33 grounded in enemy waters, 15 December 1941, and destroyed to prevent capture, Cape Santiago, Luzon, Philippine Islands, 26 December 1941.

PT-34 sunk by Japanese aircraft strafing attack off Cauit Island, Cebu, Philippine Islands, 9 April 1942.

PT-35 destroyed to prevent capture, Cebu City, Cebu, Philippine Islands, 12 April 1942.

PT-37 sunk by Japanese destroyer Kawakaze off Cape Esperance, Guadalcanal, Solomon Islands, 1 February 1943.

PT-41 destroyed to prevent capture on road to Lake Lanao, Mindanao, Philippine Islands, 15 April 1942.

PT-43 crippled by the Japanese destroyers Hatsukaze and Tokitsukaze, beached, and destroyed to prevent capture on Guadalcanal, Solomon Islands, 11 January 1943.

PT-44 destroyed by the Japanese destroyers Kawakaze and Suzukaze off Guadalcanal, Solomon Islands, 12 December 1942.

PT-63 destroyed by accidental fire while refueling in port, Hamburg Bay, Emirau Island, 18 June 1944.

PT-67 destroyed by accidental fire while refueling in port, Tufi, New Guinea, 17 March 1943.

PT-68 grounded in enemy waters and destroyed to prevent capture near Vincke Point, New Guinea, 1 October 1943.

PT-73 grounded in enemy waters and destroyed to prevent capture, Baliquias Bay, Mindoro, Philippine Islands, 15 January 1945.

PT-77 sunk in error by the USS Conyngham (DD-371) and USS Lough (DE-586) near Talin Point, Luzon, Philippine Islands, 1 February 1945.

PT-79 sunk in error by the USS Conyngham (DD-371) and USS Lough (DE-586) near Talin Point, Luzon, Philippine Islands, 1 February 1945.

PT-107 destroyed by accidental fire while refueling in port, Hamburg Bay, Emirau Island, 18 June 1944.

PT-109 sunk after being rammed by Japanese destroyer Amigiri off Kolombangara Island, Blackett Strait, Solomon Islands, 2 August 1943.

PT-110 sunk after collision in Ablingi Harbor, New Britain, 26 January 1944.

PT-111 destroyed by the Kawakaze off Guadalcanal, Solomon Islands, 1 February 1943.

PT-112 destroyed by Hatsukaze and Tokitsukaze off Guadalcanal, Solomon Islands, 11 January 1943.

PT-113 destroyed as a result of grounding, not in enemy waters, Veale Reef, near Tufi, New Guinea, 8 August 1943.

PT-117 destroyed by Japanese aircraft bombing, Rendova Harbor, Solomon Islands, 1 August 1943.

PT-118 grounded in enemy waters and destroyed to prevent capture, off Vella Lavella, Solomon Islands, 7 September 1943.

PT-119 destroyed by fire in port, Tufi, New Guinea, 17 March 1943.

PT-121 destroyed by Australian aircraft, mistaken identification, Bangula Bay, New Britain, 27 March 1944.

PT-123 destroyed by Japanese aircraft bombing, off Guadalcanal, Solomon Islands, 1 February 1943.

PT-133 destroyed by Japanese shore batteries, near Cape Pus, New Guinea, 15 July 1944.

PT-135 grounded in enemy waters and destroyed to prevent capture, near Crater Point, New Britain, 12 April 1944.

PT-136 grounded in enemy waters and destroyed to prevent capture, Malai Island, Vitiaz Strait, New Guinea, 17 September 1943.

PT-145 grounded in enemy waters and destroyed to prevent capture, Mindiri, New Guinea, 4 January 1944.

PT-147 grounded in enemy waters and destroyed to prevent capture, Teliata Point, New Guinea, 20 November 1943.

PT-153 grounded in enemy waters and destroyed to prevent capture, near Munda Point, New Georgia, 4 July 1943.

PT-158 grounded in enemy waters and destroyed to prevent capture, near Munda Point, New Georgia, 5 July 1943.

PT-164 destroyed by Japanese aircraft bombing, Rendova Harbor, Solomon Islands, 1 August 1943.

PT-165 lost in transit, tanker torpedoed by Japanese submarine I-17, 100 miles south of Nouméa, New Caledonia, 24 May 1943.

PT-166 destroyed in error by US Army Air Force B-25 bombers, mistaken identification, off New Georgia, 20 July 1943.

PT-172 grounded in enemy waters and destroyed to prevent capture, off Vella Lavella, Solomon Islands, 7 September 1943.

PT-173 lost in transit, tanker torpedoed by Japanese submarine I-17, 100 miles south of Nouméa, New Caledonia, 24 May 1943.

PT-193 grounded in enemy waters and destroyed to prevent capture, Noemfoor Island, New Guinea, 25 June 1944.

PT-200 lost after collision, 22 February 1944, off Newport, Rhode Island, and sank 23 February 1944.

PT-202 destroyed by enemy mine, off Point Aygulf, France, Mediterranean Sea, 16 August 1944.

PT-218 destroyed by enemy mine, off Point Aygulf, France, Mediterranean Sea, 16 August 1944.

PT-219 damaged in storm and scrapped, near Attu, Aleutian Islands, 14 September 1943.

PT-239 destroyed by fire in port, Lambu Lambu, Vella Lavella, Solomon Islands, 14 December 1943.

PT-247 destroyed by Japanese shore batteries, off Bougainville, Solomon Islands, 5 May 1944.

PT-251 destroyed by Japanese shore batteries, off Bougainville, Solomon Islands, 26 February 1944.

PT-279 lost in collision, off Bougainville, Solomon Islands, 11 February 1944.

PT-283 damaged by Japanese shore batteries or wild shot from U.S. warship, 18 March 1944, and sank off Bougainville, Solomon Islands, 19 March 1944.

PT-300 destroyed by kamikaze attack, Mindoro, Philippine Islands, 18 December 1944.

PT-301 damaged by explosion in port and scrapped, Mios Woendi, New Guinea, 7 November 1944.

PT-311 destroyed by enemy mine, Ligurian Sea, Mediterranean Sea, 18 November 1944.

PT-320 destroyed by Japanese aircraft bombing, Leyte Gulf, Philippine Islands, 5 November 1944.

PT-321 grounded in enemy waters and destroyed to prevent capture, San Isidro Bay, Leyte, Philippine Islands, 11 November 1944.

PT-322 grounded in enemy waters and destroyed to prevent capture, near Hardenberg Point, New Guinea, 23 November 1943.

PT-323 destroyed by kamikaze attack, Leyte Gulf, Philippine Islands, 10 December 1944.

PT-337 destroyed by Japanese shore batteries, Hansa Bay, New Guinea, 7 March 1944.

PT-338 grounded, 27 January 1945, and destroyed as a result of grounding, not in enemy waters, Semirara Island, Philippine Islands, 31 January 1945.

PT-339 grounded in enemy waters and destroyed to prevent capture, near Pur Pur, New Guinea, 27 May 1944.

PT-346 destroyed by U.S. Navy aircraft, mistaken identification, near Cape Pomas, New Britain Island, 29 April 1944.

PT-347 destroyed by U.S. Navy aircraft, mistaken identification, near Cape Pomas, New Britain Island, 29 April 1944.

PT-353 destroyed by Australian aircraft, mistaken identification, Bangula Bay, New Britain Island, 27 March 1944.

PT-363 destroyed by Japanese shore batteries in Knoe Bay, Halmahera, Netherlands East Indies, 25 November 1944.

PT-368 grounded in enemy waters and destroyed to prevent capture, near Cape Salimoedi, Halmahera, Netherlands East Indies, 11 October 1944.

PT-371 grounded in enemy waters and destroyed to prevent capture, near Tagalasa, Halmahera, Netherlands East Indies, 19 September 1944.

PT-493 destroyed by the Japanese battleship Yamashiro, Surigao Strait, Philippine Islands, 25 October 1944.

PT-509 destroyed by ramming of a German minesweeper in the English Channel, 9 August 1944.

PT-555 damaged by a German mine off Cape Couronne, Mediterranean Sea, 24 August 1944, and sunk by US gunfire, 8 September 1944.

=== Yacht (PY) ===
USS Cythera (PY-26) sunk after being torpedoed by German submarine off North Carolina, 2 May 1942.

=== Yacht, coastal (PYc) ===
USS Moonstone (PYc-9) sunk after collision with the USS Greer (DD-145) off the Delaware Capes, Delaware, 16 October 1943.

=== Converted patrol vessels ===
Fisheries II (converted yacht) destroyed to prevent capture at Corregidor, Luzon, Philippine Islands, 5 May 1942.

Maryann (converted yacht) destroyed to prevent capture at Corregidor, Luzon, Philippine Islands, 5 May 1942.

Perry (converted small patrol vessel) destroyed to prevent capture at Corregidor, Luzon, Philippine Islands, 5 May 1942.

=== Patrol vessel, district (YP) ===
USS YP-16 lost due to Japanese occupation of Guam and stricken from the Navy List, 24 July 1942.

USS YP-17 lost due to Japanese occupation of Guam and stricken from the Navy List, 24 July 1942.

YP-26 destroyed by undetermined explosion in the Canal Zone, Panama, 19 November 1942.

YP-47 sunk by collision off Staten Island, New York, 26 April 1943.

USS YP-72 destroyed by grounding at Adak, Aleutian Islands, 22 February 1943.

USS YP-73 destroyed by grounding in Kodiak Harbor, Alaska, 15 January 1945.

YP-74 sunk by collision, 6 September 1942.

YP-77 sunk in collision off Atlantic coast, 28 April 1942.

YP-88 destroyed by grounding at Amchitka, Aleutian Islands, 28 October 1943.

YP-94 destroyed by grounding, 18 February 1945.

YP-95 destroyed by grounding at Adak, Aleutian Islands, 1 May 1944.

YP-97 lost due to Japanese occupation of the Philippine Islands and stricken from the Navy List, 24 July 1942.

YP-128 destroyed by grounding off Monterey, California, 30 June 1942.

YP-183 destroyed by grounding on the west coast of Hawaii, 12 January 1943.

YP-205 destroyed by grounding, 1 November 1942.

YP-235 destroyed by undetermined explosion in the Gulf of Mexico, 1 April 1943.

YP-270 destroyed by grounding, 30 June 1942.

YP-277 scuttled to avoid capture east of Hawaii, 23 May 1942.

YP-279 foundered in heavy weather off Townsville, Australia, 5 September 1943.

YP-281 foundered in heavy weather, 9 January 1944.

YP-284 sunk by the light cruiser Sendai and destroyers Fubuki, Shikinami, and Suzukaze off Guadalcanal, Solomon Islands, 25 October 1942.

YP-331 foundered in heavy weather, 23 March 1944.

YP-336 destroyed by grounding in the Delaware River, 23 February 1943.

USS YP-345 sunk south-east of Midway Island, 31 October 1942.

YP-346 sunk by the Japanese destroyers Akatsuki, Ikazuchi, and Shiratsuyu in the South Pacific, 9 September 1942.

YP-383 sunk by collision, 24 November 1944.

YP-387 sunk by collision, 20 May 1942.

YP-389 sunk by a submarine off Cape Hatteras, North Carolina, 19 June 1942.

YP-405 destroyed by undetermined explosion in the Caribbean Sea, 20 November 1942.

YP-422 destroyed by grounding off New Caledonia.

YP-426 destroyed by grounding, 16 December 1943.

YP-438 destroyed by grounding at Port Everglades, Florida, 20 March 1943.

YP-453 destroyed by grounding in the Bahama Islands, 15 April 1943.

YP-481 destroyed by grounding at Charleston, South Carolina, 25 April 1943.

YP-492 sunk by collision off east Florida, 8 January 1943.

YP-577 destroyed by undetermined explosion in the Great Lakes, 23 January 1943.

=== Submarine chaser, (173 foot) (PC) ===
USS PC-460 sunk by collision with a submarine in the Gulf of Panama, 24 January 1942.

USS PC-496 sunk after being torpedoed by Italian submarine off Bizerte, Tunisia, 4 June 1943.

USS PC-558 sunk after being torpedoed by German submarine U-230 north of Palermo, Italy, 9 May 1944.

USS PC-584 sunk by typhoon at Okinawa, Ryukyu Islands, 9 October 1945.

USS PC-590 destroyed by grounding during typhoon at Buckner Bay, Okinawa, Ryukyu Islands, 9 October 1945.

USS PC-814 destroyed by typhoon at Okinawa, Ryukyu Islands, 12 December 1945.

USS PC-815 sunk by collision with USS Laffey (DD-724) off San Diego, California, 11 September 1945.

USS PC-1129 sunk by Japanese Suicide boat off Nasugbu, Luzon, Philippine Islands, 31 January 1945.

USS PC-1261 sunk by shellfire from shore batteries off Normandy, France, 6 June 1944.

USS PC-1603 damaged by kamikaze attack off Okinawa, Ryukyu Islands, 21 May 1945, and sunk 26 May 1945.

=== Submarine chaser (110 foot) (SC) ===
USS SC-521 foundered off Santa Cruz, Solomon Islands, 10 July 1945.

USS SC-632 sunk off Okinawa, Ryukyu Islands, 16 September 1945.

USS SC-636 sunk off Okinawa, Ryukyu Islands, 9 October 1945.

USS SC-694 sunk by aircraft off Palermo, Italy, 23 August 1943.

USS SC-696 sunk by aircraft off Palermo, Italy, 23 August 1943.

USS SC-700 sunk by accidental fire off Vella Lavella, Solomon Islands, 10 March 1944.

USS SC-709 grounded off Cape Breton, France, 21 January 1943.

USS SC-740 grounded on Great Barrier Reef, Australia, 17 June 1943.

USS SC-744 sunk by kamikaze attack in Leyte Gulf, Philippine Islands, 27 November 1944.

USS SC-751 grounded off Western Australia, 22 June 1943.

USS SC-984 grounded off New Hebrides, 9 April 1944.

USS SC-1019 lost by grounding, 22 April 1945.

USS SC-1024 sunk after collision off North Carolina, 2 March 1943.

USS SC-1059 lost by grounding off the Bahamas Islands, 12 December 1944.

USS SC-1067 foundered off Attu, Aleutian Islands, 19 November 1943.

== Amphibious ships ==
=== Landing ship, tank (LST) ===
USS LST-6 sunk by a mine in the Seine River while en route from Rouen, Zambia to Portland, England, 18 November 1941.

USS LST-43 sunk by explosion at Pearl Harbor, Hawaii, 21 May 1944.

USS LST-69 sunk by explosion at Pearl Harbor, Hawaii, 21 May 1944.

USS LST-158 sunk by aircraft off Licata, Sicily, 11 July 1943.

USS LST-167 stricken after being damaged beyond repair by Japanese aircraft off Vella Lavella, Solomon Islands, 25 September 1943.

USS LST-179 sunk by explosion at Pearl Harbor, Hawaii, 21 May 1944.

USS LST-203 destroyed by grounding near Nanumea, Ellice Islands, 2 October 1943.

USS LST-228 destroyed by grounding near Bahia Angra Island, Azores, 21 January 1944.

USS LST-282 sunk by a glider bomb off St. Tropez, France, 15 August 1944.

USS LST-313 sunk by German aircraft off Gela, Sicily, 10 July 1943.

USS LST-314 sunk by German motor torpedo boats off Normandy, France, 9 June 1944.

USS LST-318 sunk by aircraft off Caronia, Sicily, 10 August 1943.

USS LST-333 sunk by German submarine U-593 off Dellys, Algeria, 22 June 1943.

USS LST-342 sunk by Japanese submarine RO-106 west of Guadalcanal, Solomon Islands, 18 July 1943.

USS LST-348 sunk by German submarine U-410 off Anzio, Italy, 20 February 1944.

USS LST-349 sunk after running aground off Ponza, Italy, 26 February 1944.

USS LST-353 sunk by internal explosion at Pearl Harbor, Hawaii, 21 May 1944.

USS LST-359 sunk by German submarine U-870 north-east of the Azores, 20 December 1944.

USS LST-376 sunk by German motor torpedo boats off Normandy, France, 9 June 1944.

USS LST-396 sunk by accidental fire and explosion off Vella Lavella, Solomon Islands, 18 August 1943.

USS LST-422 sunk by underwater mine off Anzio, Italy, 26 January 1944.

USS LST-447 sunk by kamikaze attack off Okinawa, Ryukyu Islands, 7 April 1945.

USS LST-448 sunk by Japanese aircraft off Bougainville, Solomon Islands, 5 October 1943.

USS LST-460 sunk by kamikaze attack off Mindoro, Philippine Islands, 21 December 1944.

USS LST-472 sunk by kamikaze attack off Mindoro, Philippine Islands, 15 December 1944.

USS LST-480 sunk by explosion at Pearl Harbor, Hawaii, 21 May 1944.

USS LST-493 destroyed after grounding while attempting to enter Plymouth Harbor, England, 12 April 1945.

USS LST-496 sunk by a mine off Normandy, France, 11 June 1944.

USS LST-499 sunk by a mine off Normandy, France, 8 June 1944.

USS LST-507 sunk by German motor torpedo boats in Lyme Bay, England, 28 April 1944.

USS LST-523 sunk by a mine off Normandy, France, 19 June 1944.

USS LST-531 sunk by German motor torpedo boats in Lyme Bay, England, 28 April 1944.

USS LST-563 grounded off Clipperton Island, southwest Pacific, 22 December 1944, and abandoned, 9 February 1945.

USS LST-577 sunk by Japanese submarine RO-50 east of Mindanao, Philippine Islands, 11 February 1945.

USS LST-675 grounded off Okinawa, Ryukyu Islands, 4 April 1945, and abandoned, 17 September 1945.

USS LST-738 sunk by kamikaze aircraft off Mindoro, Philippine Islands, 15 December 1944.

USS LST-749 sunk by kamikaze aircraft off Mindoro, Philippine Islands, 21 December 1944.

USS LST-750 sunk by Japanese aircraft off Los Negros, Leyte, Philippine Islands, 28 December 1944.

USS LST-808 grounded after being damaged by Japanese aircraft off Ie Shima, Ryukyu Islands, 18 May 1945, and destroyed, 11 November 1945.

USS LST-906 grounded off Leghorn, Italy, 18 October 1944, and scrapped, 22 June 1945.

USS LST-921 torpedoed by German submarine U-764 off the channel entrance to Bristol, England, 14 August 1944, and struck from the Navy list, 14 October 1944.

=== Landing ship, medium (LSM) ===
USS LSM-12 foundered after being damaged by a Japanese suicide boat off Okinawa, Ryukyu Islands, 4 April 1945.

USS LSM-20 sunk by kamikaze attack off Ormoc, Leyte, Philippine Islands, 5 December 1944.

USS LSM-59 sunk by kamikaze attack off Okinawa, Ryukyu Islands, 21 June 1945.

USS LSM-135 sunk by kamikaze attack off Okinawa, Ryukyu Islands, 25 May 1945.

USS LSM-149 grounded off the Philippine Islands, 5 December 1944.

USS LSM-318 sunk by kamikaze attack off Ormoc, Leyte, Philippine Islands, 7 December 1944.

=== Landing ship, medium (rocket) (LSMR) ===
USS LSMR-190 sunk by kamikaze attack off Okinawa, Ryukyu Islands, 4 May 1945.

USS LSMR-194 sunk by kamikaze attack off Okinawa, Ryukyu Islands, 4 May 1945.

USS LSMR-195 sunk by kamikaze attack off Okinawa, Ryukyu Islands, 3 May 1945.

=== Landing craft, tank (LCT) ===
USS LCT(5)-19 sunk off Salerno, Italy, 15 September 1943.

USS LCT(5)-21 sunk off Oran, Algeria, 1 January 1943.

USS LCT(5)-23 sunk at Algiers, Algeria, 3 May 1943.

USS LCT(5)-25 sunk off northern France, 6 June 1944.

USS LCT(5)-26 sunk, 25 February 1944, and stricken from the Navy List, 6 March 1944.

USS LCT(5)-27 sunk off northern France, 6 June 1944.

USS LCT(5)-28 sunk in the Mediterranean Sea, 30 May 1943.

USS LCT(5)-30 sunk off northern France, 6 June 1944.

USS LCT(5)-35 sunk off Anzio, Italy, 15 February 1944.

USS LCT(5)-36 sunk off Naples, Italy, 26 February 1944.

USS LCT(5)-66 sunk at Pearl Harbor, Hawaii, 12 April 1945.

USS LCT(5)-71 sunk, 11 September 1943.

USS LCT(5)-147 sunk off northern France, June 1944.

USS LCT(5)-154 sunk, 31 August 1943.

USS LCT(5)-175 sunk, 21 February 1945.

USS LCT(5)-182 sunk off the Solomon Islands, 7 August 1944.

USS LCT(5)-185 sunk off Bizerte, Tunisia, 24 January 1944.

USS LCT(5)-196 sunk off Salerno, Italy, 27 September 1943.

USS LCT(5)-197 sunk off northern France, 6 June 1944.

USS LCT(5)-200 sunk off northern France, June 1944.

USS LCT(5)-208 sunk off Algeria, 20 June 1943.

USS LCT(5)-209 sunk off northern France, 10 June 1944.

USS LCT(5)-215 sunk off Salerno, Italy, 1943.

USS LCT(5)-220 sunk at Anzio, Italy, 13 February 1944.

USS LCT(5)-241 sunk off Salerno, Italy, 15 September 1943.

USS LCT(5)-242 sunk off Naples, Italy, 2 December 1943.

USS LCT(5)-244 sunk off northern France, 8 June 1944.

USS LCT(5)-253 sunk on passage to Tarawa, 21 January 1945.

USS LCT(5)-293 sunk in English Channel, 11 October 1944.

USS LCT(5)-294 sunk off northern France, 6 June 1944.

USS LCT(5)-305 sunk off northern France, 6 June 1944.

USS LCT(5)-311 sunk off Bizerte, Tunisia, 9 August 1943.

USS LCT(5)-315 sunk at Eniwetok Atoll, Marshall Islands, 23 March 1944.

USS LCT(5)-319 sunk at Kiska, Aleutian Islands, 27 August 1943.

USS LCT(5)-332 sunk off northern France, 6 June 1944.

USS LCT(5)-340 sunk, 9 February 1944 and stricken from the Navy List, 6 March 1944.

USS LCT(5)-342 sunk off Salerno, Italy, 29 September 1943.

USS LCT(5)-352 sunk at Pearl Harbor, Hawaii, 12 April 1945.

USS LCT(5)-362 sunk off northern France, 6 June 1944.

USS LCT(5)-364 sunk off northern France, 6 June 1944.

USS LCT(5)-366 sunk, 9 September 1943.

USS LCT(5)-413 sunk off northern France, June 1944.

USS LCT(5)-458 sunk off northern France, 7 June 1944.

USS LCT(5)-459 sunk off western France, 19 September 1944.

USS LCT(5)-486 sunk off northern France, 7 June 1944.

USS LCT(5)-496 sunk in the English Channel, 2 October 1943.

USS LCT(6)-548 sunk at Portsmouth, England, October 1944.

USS LCT(6)-555 sunk off northern France, 6 June 1944.

USS LCT(6)-572 sunk off northern France, June 1944.

USS LCT(6)-579 sunk off Palau, Caroline Islands, 4 October 1944.

USS LCT(6)-582 sunk in the Azores Islands, 22 January 1944.

USS LCT(6)-593 sunk off northern France, 6 June 1944.

USS LCT(6)-597 sunk off northern France, 6 June 1944.

USS LCT(6)-612 sunk off northern France, 6 June 1944.

USS LCT(6)-703 sunk off northern France, 6 June 1944.

USS LCT(6)-713 sunk off northern France, June 1944.

USS LCT(6)-714 sunk off northern France, June 1944.

USS LCT(6)-777 sunk off northern France, 6 June 1944.

USS LCT(6)-823 sunk off Palau, Caroline Islands, 27 September 1944.

USS LCT(6)-961 sunk at Pearl Harbor, Hawaii, 21 May 1944.

USS LCT(6)-963 sunk at Pearl Harbor, Hawaii, 21 May 1944.

USS LCT(6)-983 sunk at Pearl Harbor, Hawaii, 21 May 1944.

USS LCT(6)-984 sunk, 15 May 1944, and stricken from the Navy List, 9 June 1944.

USS LCT(6)-988 sunk, 15 May 1944, and stricken from the Navy List, 9 June 1944.

USS LCT(6)-995 sunk at Guam, Mariana Islands, 21 April 1945.

USS LCT(6)-1029 sunk at Iwo Jima, Volcano Islands, 2 March 1945.

USS LCT(6)-1050 sunk off Ie Shima, Ryukyu Islands, 27 July 1945.

USS LCT(6)-1075 sunk off Leyte, Philippine Islands, 10 December 1944.

USS LCT(6)-1090 sunk off Luzon, Philippine Islands, 26 March 1945.

USS LCT(6)-1151 sunk, 26 January 1945.

USS LCT(6)-1358 sunk off California, 4 May 1945.

=== Landing craft, infantry (gunboat) (LCI(G)) ===
USS LCI(G)-82 sunk by Japanese suicide boat off Okinawa, Ryukyu Islands, 4 April 1945.

USS LCI(G)-365 sunk by Japanese suicide boat in Lingayen Gulf, Luzon, Philippine Islands, 10 January 1945.

USS LCI(G)-459 sunk off Palau, Caroline Islands, 19 September 1944.

USS LCI(G)-468 sunk, 17 June 1944.

USS LCI(G)-474 sunk off Iwo Jima, Volcano Islands, 17 February 1945.

=== Landing craft, infantry (large) (LCI(L)) ===
USS LCI(L)-1 sunk off Bizerte, Tunisia, 17 August 1943.

USS LCI(L)-20 sunk off Anzio, Italy, 22 January 1944.

USS LCI(L)-32 sunk off Anzio, Italy, 26 January 1944.

USS LCI(L)-85 sunk off northern France, 6 June 1944.

USS LCI(L)-91 sunk off northern France, 6 June 1944.

USS LCI(L)-92 sunk off northern France, 6 June 1944.

USS LCI(L)-93 sunk off northern France, 6 June 1944.

USS LCI(L)-219 sunk off northern France, 11 June 1944.

USS LCI(L)-232 sunk off northern France, 6 June 1944.

USS LCI(L)-339 sunk off New Guinea, 4 September 1943.

USS LCI(L)-416 sunk off northern France, 9 June 1944.

USS LCI(L)-497 sunk off northern France, 6 June 1944.

USS LCI(L)-553 sunk off Northern France, 6 June 1944.

USS LCI(L)-600 sunk by undetermined explosion at Ulithi, Caroline Islands, 12 January 1945.

USS LCI(L)-684 sunk off Samar, Philippine Islands, 12 November 1945.

USS LCI(L)-1065 sunk off Leyte, Philippine Islands, 24 October 1944.

=== Landing craft, infantry (mortar) (LCI(M)) ===
USS LCI(M)-974 sunk by Japanese suicide boat in Lingayen Gulf, Luzon, Philippine Islands, 10 January 1945.

=== Landing craft, support (large) (Mk. III) (LCS(L)) ===
USS LCS(L)(3)-7 sunk by Suicide boat off Mariveles, Corregidor Channel, Luzon, Philippine Islands, 16 February 1945.

USS LCS(L)(3)-15 sunk by kamikaze aircraft off Okinawa, Ryukyu Islands, 22 April 1945.

USS LCS(L)(3)-26 sunk by Suicide boat off Mariveles, Corregidor Channel, Luzon, Philippine Islands, 16 February 1945.

USS LCS(L)(3)-33 sunk by shore batteries off Iwo Jima, Volcano Islands, 19 February 1945.

USS LCS(L)(3)-37 engines damaged beyond repair by a depth charge dropped under the fantail by a suicide boat off Nakagusuki Wan, Okinawa, 28 April 1945.

USS LCS(L)(3)-49 sunk by suicide boat off Mariveles, Corregidor Channel, Luzon, Philippine Islands, 16 February 1945.

USS LCS (L)(3)-88 Fantail and aft twin 40mm heavily damaged by destroyed suicide plane bomb off Okinawa, Ryukyu Islands, 11 May 1945.

USS LCS(L)(3)-127 sunk off California, 5 March 1945, and stricken from the Navy List, 30 March 1945.

== Auxiliaries ==
=== Ammunition ship (AE) ===
USS Mount Hood (AE-11) destroyed by explosion at Manus, Admiralty Islands, 10 November 1944.

=== Provision storeship (AF) ===
USS Pontiac (AF-20) scrapped after foundering off Halifax, Nova Scotia, Canada, 30 January 1945.

=== Mobile floating dry dock (AFD) ===
USS AFD-13 sank off Okinawa, Ryukyu Islands, 16 September 1945.

=== Miscellaneous auxiliary (AG) ===
USS Robert L. Barnes (AG-27) captured at Guam, Marianas Islands, 10 December 1941.

USS Utah (AG-16) capsized after being torpedoed by Japanese aircraft at Pearl Harbor, Territory of Hawaii, 7 December 1941.

=== Motor torpedo boat tender (AGP) ===
USS Niagara (AGP-1) sunk by Japanese aircraft bombing near San Cristobal Island, Solomon Islands, 23 May 1943.

=== Cargo ship (AK) ===
USS Aludra (AK-72) sunk after being torpedoed by Japanese submarine RO-103 off San Cristobal Island, Solomon Islands, 23 June 1943.

USS Atik (AK-101) sunk while deployed as a Q-Ship (warship disguised as a merchantman) in a battle with German submarine U-123 in the North Atlantic, 26 March 1942.

USS Deimos (AK-78) sunk after being torpedoed by Japanese submarine RO-103 off San Cristobal Island, Solomon Islands, 23 June 1943.

USS Serpens (AK-97) destroyed by explosion off Guadalcanal, Solomon Islands, 29 January 1945.

=== General stores issue ship (AKS) ===
USS Pollux (AKS-2) wrecked in Placentia Bay, Newfoundland, Canada, 18 February 1942.

=== Net laying ship (AN) ===
USS Ailanthus (AN-38) lost by grounding in the Aleutian Islands, 26 February 1944.

=== Oiler (AO) ===
USS Kanawha (AO-1) damaged by Japanese aircraft at Tulagi, Solomon Islands, 7 April 1943, sinks on 8 April 1943.

USS Mississinewa (AO-59) sunk after being hit by Kaiten (suicide torpedo) fired by the Japanese submarine I-47, at Ulithi, Caroline Islands, 20 November 1944.

USS Neches (AO-5) sunk after being torpedoed by Japanese submarine I-72 135 miles west of Honolulu, Territory of Hawaii, 23 January 1942.

USS Neosho (AO-23), destroyed on 7 May 1942 by Japanese dive bombers from the Japanese aircraft carriers Shōkaku and Zuikaku during the Battle of the Coral Sea, scuttled by destroyer Henley (DD-391) on 11 May 1942.

USS Pecos (AO-6) sunk by Japanese planes from the aircraft carrier Sōryū south of Christmas Island, 1 March 1942.

USS Cowanesque (AO-79) damaged on 3 January 1945 off of San Pedro Bay, Philippines, by kamikaze attack of a Japanese single-engine fighter crashing into her port side and disintegrating violently, spreading burning gasoline over the deck. Damage control parties dumped the unexploded bomb from the plane over the side, brought the fires under control.

=== Gasoline tanker (AOG) ===
USS Sheepscot (AOG-24) scrapped after being damaged beyond repair by grounding off Iwo Jima, Volcano Islands, 5 June 1945.

=== Transport (AP) ===
USS Edward Rutledge (AP-52) sunk after being torpedoed by German submarine U-130 off Fedala, Morocco, 12 November 1942.

USS George F. Elliott (AP-13) damaged by Japanese aircraft off Guadalcanal, Solomon Islands, scuttled by destroyer Hull (DD-350), 8 August 1942.

USS Hugh L. Scott (AP-43) sunk after being torpedoed by German submarine U-130 off Fedala, Morocco, 12 November 1942.

USS Joseph Hewes (AP-50) sunk after being torpedoed by German submarine U-173 off Fedala, Morocco, 11 November 1942.

USS Leedstown (AP-73) sunk after being torpedoed by German aircraft off Algiers, Algeria, 9 November 1942.

USS Susan B. Anthony (AP-72) sunk by a mine off Normandy, France, 7 June 1944.

USS Tasker H. Bliss (AP-42) sunk after being torpedoed by German submarine U-130 off Fedala, Morocco, 12 November 1942.

USS Thomas Stone (AP-59) torpedoed by German aircraft off Cape Palos, Spain, 7 November 1942, and abandoned after going aground in Algiers Harbor, 25 November 1942.

USS Lafayette (AP-53) converted from SS Normandie () sunk by the FDNY at NYC Pier 88, Brooklyn, 9 February 1942.

=== Transport, attack (APA) ===
USS John Penn (APA-23) sunk by Japanese aircraft off Guadalcanal, Solomon Islands, 13 August 1943.

USS McCawley (APA-4) torpedoed by Japanese aircraft off Rendova, Solomon Islands, and sunk by U.S. motor torpedo boats, 30 June 1943.

=== Coastal transport (small) (APc) ===
USS APc-21 sunk by aircraft off Arawe, New Britain Island, 17 December 1943.

USS APc-35 grounded off New Georgia, Solomon Islands, 22 September 1943.

=== High-speed transport (APD) ===
USS Barry (APD-29) damaged by kamikaze attack off Okinawa, Ryukyu Islands, 25 May 1945, and sunk as a decoy, 21 June 1945.

USS Bates (APD-47) sunk by kamikaze attack off Okinawa, Ryukyu Islands, 25 May 1945.

USS Belknap (APD-34) scrapped after being damaged beyond repair by kamikaze attack at Lingayen, Philippine Islands, 11 January 1945.

USS Brooks (APD-10) scrapped after being damaged beyond repair by kamikaze attack in Lingayen Gulf, Philippine Islands, 6 January 1945.

USS Colhoun (APD-2) sunk by Japanese aircraft off Guadalcanal, Solomon Islands, 30 August 1942.

USS Dickerson (APD-21) damaged by Japanese aircraft off Okinawa, Ryukyu Islands, 2 April 1945, and scuttled, 4 April 1945.

USS Gregory (APD-3) sunk by Japanese destroyer Yūdachi, Hatsuyuki, and Murakumo off Lunga Point, Guadalcanal, Solomon Islands, 5 September 1942.

USS Little (APD-4) sunk by Japanese destroyers Yūdachi, Hatsuyuki, and Murakumo off Lunga Point, Guadalcanal, Solomon Islands, 5 September 1942.

USS McKean (APD-5) sunk after being torpedoed by Japanese aircraft off Bougainville, Solomon Islands, 17 November 1943.

USS Noa (APD-24) sunk in collision with USS Fullam (DD-474) off Palau, Caroline Islands, 12 September 1944.

USS Ward (APD-16) damaged by kamikaze attack off Ormoc, Leyte, Philippine Islands; scuttled by destroyer O'Brien (DD-725), 7 December 1944.

=== Salvage vessel (ARS) ===
USS Extractor (ARS-15) sunk after being torpedoed in error by USS Guardfish (SS-217) in the Philippine Sea, 24 January 1945.

USS Redwing (ARS-4) sunk by explosion at Bizerte, Tunisia, 27 June 1943.

USS Rescuer (ARS-18) lost by grounding in the Aleutian Islands, 1 January 1943.

=== Submarine tender (AS) ===
USS Canopus (AS-9) scuttled off Mariveles Bay, Bataan, Luzon, Philippine Islands, 9 April 1942.

=== Submarine rescue vessel (ASR) ===
USS Macaw (ASR-11) lost by grounding on a reef in Midway Channel, 12 February 1944.

USS Pigeon (ASR-6) sunk by Japanese aircraft off Corregidor, Luzon, Philippine Islands, 5 May 1942.

=== Ocean tug (AT) ===
USS Genesee (AT-55) scuttled off Corregidor, Luzon, Philippine Islands, 5 May 1942.

USS Grebe (AT-134) wrecked south of Fiji Islands, 5 December 1942.

USS Napa (AT-32) scuttled off Bataan, Luzon, Philippine Islands, 9 April 1942.

USS Nauset (AT-89) sunk by German aircraft in the Gulf of Salerno, Italy, 9 September 1943.

USS Navajo (AT-64) sunk by Japanese submarine I-39 east of the New Hebrides Islands, 12 September 1943.

USS Seminole (AT-65) sunk by Japanese destroyers Akatsuki, Ikazuchi, and Shiratsuyu, off Lunga Point, Guadalcanal, Solomon Islands, 25 October 1942.

=== Ocean tug, old (ATO) ===
USS Partridge (ATO-138) sunk after being torpedoed by German motor torpedo boats off Normandy, France, 11 June 1944.

USS Sonoma (ATO-12) sunk by Japanese aircraft off Leyte, Philippine Islands, 24 October 1944.

=== Ocean tug, rescue (ATR) ===
USS ATR-15 lost by grounding off Normandy, France, 19 June 1944.

USS ATR-98 sunk in collision off the Azores Islands, 12 April 1944.

=== Seaplane tender (AV) ===
USS Langley (AV-3) irreparably damaged by Japanese aircraft bombs south of Java, Netherlands East Indies, 27 February 1942, scuttled by destroyer Whipple (DD-217).

=== Seaplane tender (destroyer) (AVD) ===
USS Thornton (AVD-11) scrapped after being damaged in collision with USS Ashtabula (AO-51) off Okinawa, Ryukyu Islands, 5 April 1945.

=== Seaplane tender (small) (AVP) ===
USS Gannet (AVP-8) sunk after being torpedoed by German submarine U-653 off Bermuda, 7 June 1942.

== Miscellaneous unclassified (IX) ==
USS Asphalt (IX-153) destroyed after grounding on a reef during a storm at Saipan, Marianas Islands, 6 October 1944.

Ex-USS Rochester (CA-2) scuttled as a block ship in Subic Channel, Luzon, Philippine Islands, 24 December 1941.

USS Ronaki (IX-94) sunk after grounding on a reef off eastern Australia, 18 June 1943.

=== Damage control hulk ===
DCH-1 (IX-44) (ex-Walker) scuttled by gunfire from oiler USS Neches (AO-5) while under tow from San Diego, California, to Pearl Harbor, Territory of Hawaii, 8 December 1941.

=== Station tanker ===
USS Porcupine (IX-126) damaged by kamikaze attack off Mindoro, Philippine Islands, scuttled by destroyer Gansevoort (DD-608), 30 December 1944.

== District craft ==
=== Lighter, ash (YA) ===
USS YA-52 lost due to enemy action in the Philippine Islands and stricken from the Navy List, 24 July 1942.

USS YA-59 lost due to enemy action in the Philippine Islands and stricken from the Navy List, 24 July 1942.

USS YA-65 lost due to enemy action in the Philippine Islands and stricken from the Navy List, 24 July 1942.

=== District auxiliary, miscellaneous (YAG) ===
USS YAG-2 lost due to enemy action in the Philippine Islands and stricken from the Navy List, 22 February 1943.

USS YAG-3 lost due to enemy action in the Philippine Islands and stricken from the Navy List, 22 February 1943.

USS YAG-4 lost due to enemy action in the Philippine Islands and stricken from the Navy List, 22 February 1943.

USS YAG-17 lost, 14 September 1944, and stricken from the Navy List, 23 February 1945.

=== Lighter, covered (non-self-propelled) (YC) ===
USS YC-178 lost due to enemy action in the Philippine Islands and stricken from the Navy List, 24 July 1942.

USS YC-181 lost due to enemy action in the Philippine Islands and stricken from the Navy List, 24 July 1942.

USS YC-523 lost off Portsmouth, New Hampshire, 24 February 1944.

USS YC-537 lost due to enemy action in the Philippine Islands and stricken from the Navy List, 24 July 1942.

USS YC-643 lost due to enemy action in the Philippine Islands and stricken from the Navy List, 24 July 1942.

USS YC-644 lost due to enemy action in the Philippine Islands and stricken from the Navy List, 24 July 1942.

USS YC-646 lost due to enemy action in the Philippine Islands and stricken from the Navy List, 24 July 1942.

USS YC-647 lost due to enemy action in the Philippine Islands and stricken from the Navy List, 24 July 1942.

USS YC-648 lost due to enemy action in the Philippine Islands and stricken from the Navy List, 24 July 1942.

USS YC-649 lost due to enemy action in the Philippine Islands and stricken from the Navy List, 24 July 1942.

USS YC-652 lost due to enemy action in the Philippine Islands and stricken from the Navy List, 24 July 1942.

USS YC-653 lost due to enemy action in the Philippine Islands and stricken from the Navy List, 24 July 1942.

USS YC-654 lost due to enemy action in the Philippine Islands and stricken from the Navy List, 24 July 1942.

USS YC-664 lost due to enemy action at Guam, Marianas Islands, and stricken from the Navy List, 24 July 1942.

USS YC-665 lost due to enemy action at Guam, Marianas Islands, and stricken from the Navy List, 24 July 1942.

USS YC-666 lost due to enemy action at Guam, Marianas Islands, and stricken from the Navy List, 24 July 1942.

USS YC-667 lost due to enemy action at Guam, Marianas Islands, and stricken from the Navy List, 24 July 1942.

USS YC-668 lost due to enemy action at Guam, Marianas Islands, and stricken from the Navy List, 24 July 1942.

USS YC-669 lost due to enemy action in the Philippine Islands, and stricken from the Navy List, 24 July 1942.

USS YC-670 lost due to enemy action at Guam, Marianas Islands, and stricken from the Navy List, 24 July 1942.

USS YC-671 lost due to enemy action at Guam, Marianas Islands, and stricken from the Navy List, 24 July 1942.

USS YC-672 lost due to enemy action at Guam, Marianas Islands, and stricken from the Navy List, 24 July 1942.

USS YC-673 lost due to enemy action at Guam, Marianas Islands, and stricken from the Navy List, 24 July 1942.

USS YC-674 lost due to enemy action at Guam, Marianas Islands, and stricken from the Navy List, 24 July 1942.

USS YC-683 lost due to enemy action in the Philippine Islands and stricken from the Navy List, 24 July 1942.

USS YC-685 lost due to enemy action at Guam, Marianas Islands, and stricken from the Navy List, 24 July 1942.

USS YC-693 lost off Alaska, 1 February 1945, and stricken from the Navy List, 23 February 1945.

USS YC-714 lost due to enemy action in the Philippine Islands and stricken from the Navy List, 24 July 1942.

USS YC-715 lost due to enemy action in the Philippine Islands and stricken from the Navy List, 24 July 1942.

USS YC-716 lost due to enemy action in the Philippine Islands and stricken from the Navy List, 24 July 1942.

USS YC-717 lost due to enemy action at Guam, Marianas Islands, and stricken from the Navy List, 24 July 1942.

USS YC-718 lost due to enemy action at Guam, Marianas Islands, December 1941, and stricken from the Navy List, 21 April 1944.

USS YC-857 lost off Cape Cod, Massachusetts, 12 November 1943.

USS YC-869 lost off Imperial Beach, California 23 March 1943.

USS YC-886 lost at Guantanamo, Cuba, 3 February 1943.

USS YC-887 lost at Guantanamo, Cuba, 3 February 1943.

USS YC-891 lost off Key West, Florida, 18 April 1943.

USS YC-898 lost off Key West, Florida, 29 September 1942.

USS YC-899 lost off Key West, Florida, 29 September 1942.

USS YC-912 lost in the North Pacific, 13 January 1945.

USS YC-961 lost at Biorka Island, 1 May 1945.

USS YC-970 lost in Puget Sound, Washington, 14 August 1943.

USS YC-1272 lost near San Pedro, California, June 1945.

USS YC-1278 lost off the Atlantic coast, 10 March 1943.

=== Float, car (non-self-propelled) (YCF) ===
USS YCF-23 lost en route to Eniwetok, Marshall Islands, March 1945, and stricken from the Navy List, 28 April 1945.

USS YCF-29 lost en route to Eniwetok, Marshall Islands, March 1945, and stricken from the Navy List, 28 April 1945.

USS YCF-36 lost en route to Eniwetok, Marshall Islands, March 1945, and stricken from the Navy List, 28 April 1945.

USS YCF-37 lost en route to Eniwetok, Marshall Islands, March 1945, and stricken from the Navy List, 28 April 1945.

USS YCF-42 lost, December 1944, and stricken from the Navy List, 8 February 1945.

USS YCF-59 lost off Delaware, January 1945, and stricken from the Navy List, 30 March 1945.

=== Lighter, open cargo (YCK) ===
USS YCK-1 lost due to enemy action at Wake Island, December 1941.

USS YCK-2 lost, 5 November 1943.

USS YCK-8 lost off Key West, Florida, 13 December 1943.

=== Derrick, floating (non-self-propelled) (YD) ===
USS YD-19 lost due to enemy action in the Philippine Islands and stricken from the Navy List, 24 July 1942.

USS YD-47 lost due to enemy action in the Philippine Islands and stricken from the Navy List, 24 July 1942.

USS YD-56 lost due to enemy action in the Philippine Islands and stricken from the Navy List, 24 July 1942.

USS YD-60 lost due to enemy action in the Philippine Islands and stricken from the Navy List, 24 July 1942.

=== Degaussing vessel (YDG) ===
USS YDG-4 lost off New Caledonia, 1 October 1943.

=== Lighter, covered (self-propelled) (YF) ===
USS YF-86 lost due to enemy action in the Philippine Islands and stricken from the Navy List, 24 July 1942.

USS YF-177 lost due to enemy action in the Philippine Islands and stricken from the Navy List, 24 July 1942.

USS YF-178 lost due to enemy action in the Philippine Islands and stricken from the Navy List, 24 July 1942.

USS YF-179 lost due to enemy action in the Philippine Islands and stricken from the Navy List, 24 July 1942.

USS YF-180 lost due to enemy action in the Philippine Islands and stricken from the Navy List, 24 July 1942.

USS YF-181 lost due to enemy action in the Philippine Islands and stricken from the Navy List, 24 July 1942.

USS YF-212 lost due to enemy action in the Philippine Islands and stricken from the Navy List, 24 July 1942.

USS YF-223 lost due to enemy action in the Philippine Islands and stricken from the Navy List, 24 July 1942.

USS YF-224 lost due to enemy action in the Philippine Islands and stricken from the Navy List, 24 July 1942.

USS YF-230 lost due to enemy action in the Philippine Islands and stricken from the Navy List, 24 July 1942.

USS YF-317 lost due to enemy action in the Philippine Islands, January – May 1942.

USS YF-401 lost, 20 June 1943.

USS YF-415 lost, 11 May 1944, and stricken from the Navy List, 16 May 1944.

USS YF-487 lost in the Caribbean Sea, 18 July 1943.

USS YF-575 lost off Atlantic City, New Jersey, 6 May 1943.

USS YF-579 lost at San Francisco, California, 20 September 1943.

USS YF-724 lost off the Farallone Islands, 22 March 1945.

USS YF-725 lost off the Farallone Islands, 22 March 1945.

USS YF-777 lost at Eniwetok, Marshall Islands, 6 August 1945.

USS YF-926 lost en route to Pearl Harbor, Territory of Hawaii, 8 March 1945.

=== Ferryboats and launches (YFB) ===
USS Camia (YFB-683) lost due to enemy action at Cavite, Luzon, Philippine Islands, and stricken from the Navy List, 24 July 1942.

USS Dapdap (YFB-684) lost due to enemy action at Luzon, Philippine Islands, and stricken from the Navy List, 24 July 1942.

USS Magdalena (YFB-687) lost due to enemy action at Luzon, Philippine Islands, and stricken from the Navy List, 24 July 1942.

USS Rivera (YFB-685) lost due to enemy action at Luzon, Philippine Islands, and stricken from the Navy List, 24 July 1942.

USS Rosal (YFB-682) lost due to enemy action at Luzon, Philippine Islands, and stricken from the Navy List, 24 July 1942.

USS San Felipe (YFB-12) lost due to enemy action at Luzon, Philippine Islands, and stricken from the Navy List, 24 July 1942.

USS Santa Rita (Launch Number 681) lost due to enemy action at Luzon, Philippine Islands, and stricken from the Navy List, 24 July 1942.

USS Yacal (YFB-688) lost due to enemy action at Luzon, Philippine Islands, and stricken from the Navy List, 24 July 1942.

=== Floating dry dock ===
USS Dewey (YFD-1) scuttled to prevent capture at Bataan, Philippine Islands, 10 April 1942.

USS YFD-20 lost off California, 31 January 1943.

=== Lighter, garbage (self-propelled) (YG) ===
USS YG-39 lost, 27 September 1944, and stricken from the Navy List, 13 November 1944.

USS YG-44 lost at Pearl Harbor, Territory of Hawaii, 7 February 1945.

=== Dredge (self-propelled) (YM) ===
USS YM-4 lost due to enemy action in the Philippine Islands and stricken from the Navy List, 22 February 1942.

USS YM-13 lost due to enemy action at Guam, Marianas Islands, and stricken from the Navy List, 22 February 1942.

=== Barge, fuel oil (self-propelled) (YO) ===
USS YO-41 lost due to enemy action in the Philippine Islands and stricken from the Navy List, 24 July 1942.

USS YO-42 lost due to enemy action in the Philippine Islands and stricken from the Navy List, 24 July 1942.

USS YO-64 lost due to enemy action in the Philippine Islands, January 1942, and stricken from the Navy List, 21 April 1944.

USS YO-156 lost at Sitka, Alaska, May 1945.

USS YO-157 lost at Sitka, Alaska, May 1945.

USS YO-159 lost off the New Hebrides Islands, 14 January 1944.

=== Pile driver (non-self-propelled) (YPD) ===
USS YPD-22 lost due to enemy action in the Philippine Islands, January – May 1942.

=== Barge, pontoon storage (YPK) ===
USS YPK-6 lost due to enemy action in the Philippine Islands and stricken from the Navy List, 24 July 1942.

USS YPK-7 lost due to enemy action in the Philippine Islands and stricken from the Navy List, 24 July 1942.

=== Workshop, floating (non-self-propelled) (YR) ===
USS YR-43 lost in the Gulf of Alaska, 28 March 1945.

=== Submarine rescue chamber (YRC) ===
USS YRC-4 lost due to enemy action in the Philippine Islands and stricken from the Navy List, 24 July 1942.

=== Pontoon, salvage (YSP) ===
USS YSP-41 lost due to enemy action in the Philippine Islands and stricken from the Navy List, 24 July 1942.

USS YSP-42 lost due to enemy action in the Philippine Islands and stricken from the Navy List, 24 July 1942.

USS YSP-43 lost due to enemy action in the Philippine Islands and stricken from the Navy List, 24 July 1942.

USS YSP-44 lost due to enemy action in the Philippine Islands and stricken from the Navy List, 24 July 1942.

USS YSP-45 lost due to enemy action in the Philippine Islands and stricken from the Navy List, 24 July 1942.

USS YSP-46 lost due to enemy action in the Philippine Islands and stricken from the Navy List, 24 July 1942.

USS YSP-47 lost due to enemy action in the Philippine Islands and stricken from the Navy List, 24 July 1942.

USS YSP-48 lost due to enemy action in the Philippine Islands and stricken from the Navy List, 24 July 1942.

USS YSP-49 lost due to enemy action in the Philippine Islands and stricken from the Navy List, 24 July 1942.

USS YSP-50 lost due to enemy action in the Philippine Islands and stricken from the Navy List, 24 July 1942.

=== Barge, sludge removal (YSR) ===
USS YSR-2 lost due to enemy action in the Philippine Islands and stricken from the Navy List, 24 July 1942.

=== Harbor tug (YT) ===
USS Banaag (YT-104) lost due to enemy action in the Philippine Islands and stricken from the Navy List, 24 July 1942.

USS Iona (YT-107) sunk by Japanese aircraft at Cavite, Luzon, Philippine Islands, 2 January 1942.

USS Mercedes (YT-108) destroyed to prevent capture at Cavite, Luzon, Philippine Islands, 2 January 1942.

USS Shahaka (YT-368) sunk after collision with ABSD-2 midway during transit from California to Pearl Harbor, Hawaii, 9 May 1944.

USS Vaga (YT-116) scuttled to prevent capture off Corregidor, Luzon, Philippine Islands, 5 May 1942.

USS YT-198 sunk off Anzio, Italy, 18 February 1944.

USS YT-247 sunk, 5 April 1944, and stricken from the Navy List, 21 April 1944.

=== Harbor tug, medium (YTM) ===
USS YTM-467 lost in the Marshall or Gilbert Islands, March 1944, and stricken from the Navy List, 9 June 1944.

=== Barge, water (YW) ===
USS YW-50 lost due to enemy action in the Philippine Islands and stricken from the Navy List, 24 July 1942.

USS YW-54 lost due to enemy action in the Philippine Islands and stricken from the Navy List, 24 July 1942.

USS YW-55 lost due to enemy action in the Philippine Islands and stricken from the Navy List, 24 July 1942.

USS YW-58 lost due to enemy action in the Philippine Islands and stricken from the Navy List, 24 July 1942.

== US Coast Guard ships ==
=== Gunboat type cutter (WPG) ===
1. USCGC Alexander Hamilton (WPG-34) torpedoed by German submarine U-132 off Iceland, 29 January 1942; scuttled by destroyer USS Ericsson (DD-440) off Reykjavík, 30 January 1942.
2. USCGC Escanaba (WPG-77) sunk by undetermined explosion off Ivigtut, Greenland,

13 June 1943.

=== Patrol boat (WPC) ===
1. USCGC Bedloe (WPC-128) foundered during a hurricane off Cape Hatteras, North Carolina, 14 September 1944.
2. USCGC Jackson (WPC-142) foundered during a hurricane off Cape Hatteras, North Carolina, 14 September 1944.

=== Patrol boat, 83-foot type (numbers 83300 – 83529) ===
1. USCGC 83415 foundered off Normandy, France, 21 June 1944.
2. USCGC 83421 sunk in collision off Florida, 30 June 1943.
3. USCGC 83471 foundered off Normandy, France, 21 June 1944.

=== Patrol craft, converted ===
1. USCGC 58012 sunk by explosion off Manomet Point, Massachusetts, 2 May 1943.
2. USCGC 85006 (ex-Catamount # 229192) sunk after explosion during patrol off Ambrose Light, New York, 27 March 1943.

=== Patrol boat, converted (WYP) ===
1. USCGC Bodega (WYP-342) lost by grounding during salvage operations off the Panama Canal, Panama, 20 December 1943.
2. USCGC Dow (WYP-353) lost by grounding during a gale off Mayaguez, Puerto Rico, 14 October 1943.
3. USCGC Natsek (WYP-170) foundered in the Strait of Belle Isle, Newfoundland, Canada, 17 December 1942.
4. USCGC Wilcox (WYP-333) foundered in heavy seas off Cape Hatteras, North Carolina, 30 September 1943.

=== Lighthouse tender (WAGL) ===
1. USCGC Acacia (WAGL-200) sunk by gunfire from the German submarine U-161 south of Haiti, 15 March 1942.
2. USCGC Magnolia (WAGL-231) sunk in collision with the S.S. Maguerite LeHand off Mobile, Alabama 24 August 1945.

=== Lightship, 123 foot (LS) ===
1. USCGC Vineyard Sound Lightship (LS-73) sunk by a hurricane in Vineyard Sound, Massachusetts, 14 September 1944.

=== Weathership (WAG) ===
1. USCGC Muskeget (WAG-48) sank after being torpedoed by German submarine U-755 in the North Atlantic, 9 September 1942, no survivors.

== See also ==
- List of United States Navy losses in World War II - a more abbreviated list

== Sources ==
This page is based on the public domain list at the US Department of the Navy website.
