= USS Fanning =

Three ships in the United States Navy have been named USS Fanning for Nathaniel Fanning.

- The first USS Fanning (DD-37) was a Paulding-class destroyer launched in 1910 and served in World War I. She served in the United States Coast Guard from 1924 to 1930. She was sold in 1934.
- The second USS Fanning (DD-385) was a Mahan-class destroyer launched in 1936, served in World War II and decommissioned in 1945.
- The third USS Fanning (FF-1076) was a Knox-class frigate launched in 1970 and decommissioned in 1993. She was sold to Turkey in 1993, decommissioned in 2001, and later scrapped. Originally designated DE-1076 as a destroyer escort, she was reclassified in 1975.
