= Mahan-class destroyer =

Former class of US Navy destroyers

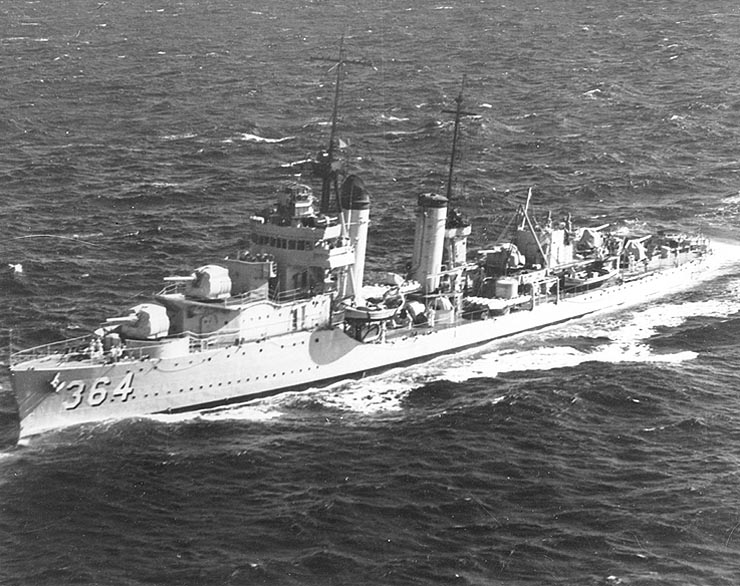
- USS Mahan circa 1938

Class overview
- Name: Mahan class
- Builders: United Shipyards, Inc., NY (4); Bath Iron Works, ME (2); Federal Shipbuilding, NJ (2); Boston Navy Yard, MA (2); Philadelphia Navy Yard, PA (2); Norfolk Navy Yard, VA (2); Puget Sound Navy Yard, WA (2); Mare Island Navy Yard, CA (2)
- Operators: United States Navy
- Preceded by: Porter class
- Succeeded by: Gridley class
- Subclasses: Dunlap (DD-384 and DD-385)
- Built: 1934–37
- In commission: 1936–46
- Completed: 18
- Lost: 6
- Retired: 12

General characteristics
- Type: Destroyer
- Displacement: 1,500 long tons (1,524 t) (standard); 1,725 long tons (1,753 t) (deep load); 2,103 long tons (2,137 t) (full load)
- Length: 341 feet 3 inches (104.0 m)
- Beam: 35 feet 6 inches (10.8 m)
- Draft: 10 feet 7 inches (3.2 m)
- Installed power: 46,000 shp (34,000 kW) (trials); 4 Babcock & Wilcox or Foster Wheeler boilers
- Propulsion: 2 General Electric steam turbines
- Speed: 37 knots (69 km/h)
- Range: 6,940 nmi (12,850 km; 7,990 mi) at 12 knots (22 km/h; 14 mph)
- Complement: 158 (peacetime) 250 (wartime) officers and enlisted men
- Sensors & processing systems: Mk33 GFCS; 1 × SC radar
- Armament: As built: 5 × 5 inch/38 caliber (127 mm) guns in five Mark 21 DP pedestal mounts. Mounts 51 and 52 were partially enclosed, and mounts 53, 54, and 55 were open.; 12 × 21 inch torpedo tubes (533 mm) (3 × 4). One tube mount was on the centerline between the stacks, and the other two were port and starboard just behind the aft stack.; 4 × .50 caliber machine guns (12.7 mm). Two on a platform just forward and below the bridge, and two on a deck house just forward of 5" mount No. 54.; 2 × depth charge roll-off stern racks.

Mahan-class destroyers of the United States Navy were a series of 18 destroyers of which the first 16 were laid down in 1934. The last two of the 18, Dunlap and Fanning (this pair laid down in 1935), are sometimes considered a separate ship class. All 18 were commissioned in 1936 and 1937. Mahan was the lead ship, named for Rear Admiral Alfred Thayer Mahan, an influential historian and theorist on sea power.

The Mahans featured improvements over previous destroyers, with 12 torpedo tubes, superimposed gun shelters, and generators for emergency use. The standard displacement increased from 1,365 tons to 1,500 tons. The class introduced a new steam propulsion system that combined increases in pressure and temperature with a new type of lightweight steam turbine, which proved simpler and more efficient than the Mahans' predecessors—to such an extent that it was used on many subsequent wartime US destroyers.

All 18 ships saw action in World War II, entirely in the Pacific Theater, which included the Guadalcanal campaign, and the battles of the Santa Cruz Islands, Leyte Gulf, and Iwo Jima. Their participation in major and secondary campaigns included the bombardment of beachheads, amphibious landings, task force screening, convoy and patrol duty, and anti-aircraft and submarine warfare. Six ships were lost in combat and two were expended in the postwar Operation Crossroads nuclear tests. The remainder were decommissioned, sold, or scrapped after the war; none remain today. Collectively, the ships received 111 battle stars for their World War II service.

== Design ==
The Mahan-class destroyers emerged as improved versions of the Farragut class, which incorporated the most up-to-date machinery available. The Navy's General Board had wrestled with the proposed design changes, first they considered 12 torpedo tubes with one fewer 5-inch (127 mm)/38 caliber gun, and then proposed to retain all five guns with the twelve torpedo tubes, but configure those guns only for surface targets, not air targets. The Chief of Naval Operations objected, and recommended against "subordinating the gun to the torpedo", and a compromise was struck that included a new engineering plant and a new battery arrangement for the Mahan class and others. In the final design, No. 3 gun was moved to the aft deckhouse (just ahead of No. 4) to make room for the third quadruple torpedo tube; the two middle torpedo tubes were moved to the sides, and released the centerline space for extension of the aft deckhouse. All five 5 in/38s were kept and remained dual purpose guns, able to target aircraft as well as ships, but only No. 1 and No. 2 had gun shields. The traditional destroyer machinery was replaced with a new generation of land-based machinery. This change ushered in a new steam propulsion system that combined increases in pressure and temperature with a new type of lightweight steam turbine, which proved simpler and more efficient to operate. Double reduction gearing also reduced the size of the faster-turning turbines and allowed cruising turbines to be added. These changes led to a ten percent increase in displacement over the Farraguts. (Note: The Mahans displaced 1,500 long tons (1,500 t) compared to 1,365 long tons (1,387 t) for the Farraguts.)

The Mahans typically had a tripod foremast with a pole mainmast. To improve the anti-aircraft field of fire, their tripod foremast was constructed without nautical rigging. In silhouette, they were similar to the larger Porter-class destroyers that immediately preceded them. The Mahans were fitted with the first emergency generators, which replaced the storage batteries of earlier classes. Gun crew shelters were built for the superimposed weapons, one shelter before the bridge and one atop the shelter deck aft.

The Mahans displaced 1,500 long tons (1,524 t) at standard load and 1,725 long tons (1,753 t) at deep load. The overall length of the class was 341 feet 3 inches (104.0 m), the beam was 35 feet 6 inches (10.8 m), and the draft 10 feet 7 inches (3.2 m). They were powered by General Electric geared steam turbines, driving two shafts that developed a total of 46,000 shaft horsepower (34,000 kW) for a maximum speed of 37 knots (69 km/h; 43 mph). Four Babcock & Wilcox or four Foster Wheeler water-tube boilers generated the superheated steam needed for the turbines. The Mahans carried a maximum of 523 long tons (531 t) of fuel oil, with a range of 6,940 nautical miles (12,850 km; 7,990 mi) at 12 knots (22 km/h; 14 mph). Their peacetime complement was 158 officers and enlisted men. The wartime complement increased to approximately 250 officers and enlisted men.

=== Engineering ===
The Mahans' propulsion plant was considerably improved over that of the Farraguts. The steam pressure was raised from 400 psi (2,800 kPa) to 465 psi (3,210 kPa) in some ships, and the superheated steam temperature was raised from 648 °F (342 °C) to 700 °F (371 °C) in all ships. Double reduction gearing replaced single reduction gearing, and allowed smaller, faster-turning turbines to be used. This saved enough space and weight so that cruising turbines could be fitted, which greatly improved fuel economy at moderate speeds. The boiler economizers, as in previous ships, further improved fuel economy. The ships' range was extended to 6,940 nmi (12,850 km; 7,990 mi) at 12 knots (22 km/h; 14 mph), 1,000 nmi (1,900 km; 1,200 mi) farther than the Farraguts. The design shaft horsepower was increased from 42,800 shp (31,900 kW) to 48,000 shp (36,000 kW) in the same space and weight as in the Farraguts. The relatively compact power plant contributed to the Mahans' ability to carry 12 torpedo tubes instead of eight with only 150 tons of extra displacement. The main turbines were manufactured by the General Electric Company and were the impulse-type, also called the Curtis turbines. Each main turbine was divided into a high-pressure (HP) and a low-pressure (LP) turbine, which fed into a common reduction gear and drove a shaft, in a similar manner to the machinery illustrated at the following reference note. The steam from the boilers was supplied to the HP turbine, which exhausted to the LP turbine, in turn exhausted to the condenser. The cruising turbines were geared to the HP turbines and could be engaged or disengaged as needed. At low speeds, they were operated in a series with the HP turbines to improve the efficiency of the overall turbine arrangement, and also improved the fuel economy. This general arrangement with double reduction gearing became a standard for most subsequent steam-powered surface ships of the US Navy, although not all of them had cruising turbines.

=== As-built armament ===
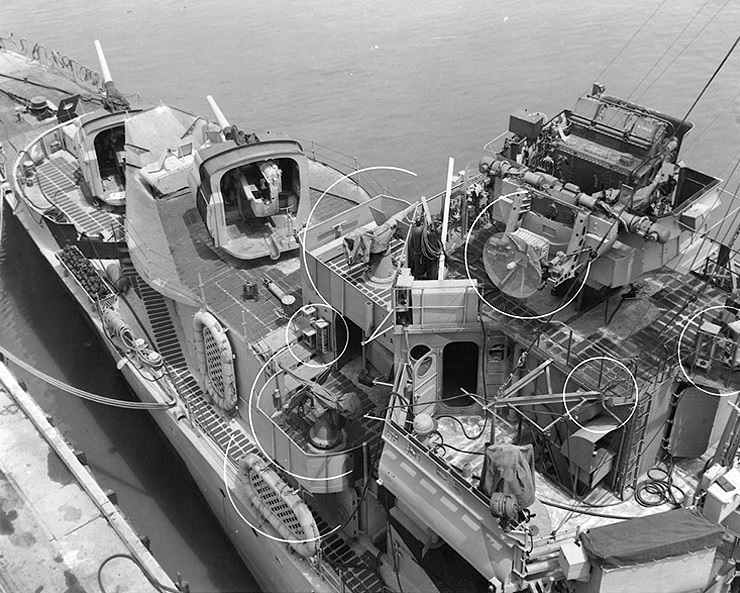
USS Mahan at Mare Island Naval Shipyard for overhaul on 24 June 1944

The main battery of the Mahan class consisted of five dual purpose 5-inch (127 mm)/38 caliber guns, equipped with the Mark 33 gun fire-control system. The anti-aircraft battery had four water-cooled .50 caliber machine guns (12.7 mm). The class was fitted with three quadruple torpedo tube mounts for twelve 21-inch (533 mm) torpedo tubes, guided by the Mark 27 torpedo fire control system. The class was initially equipped with the Mark 11 torpedo or Mark 12 torpedo, which were replaced by the Mark 15 torpedo beginning in 1938. The depth charge roll-off racks were rigged on the stern.

=== Wartime modifications ===
In early 1942, the Mahan-class destroyers began a wartime armament refitting process to increase the ships' light anti-aircraft (AA) armament. These followed the standard pattern of other five-gun destroyer classes, removing the No. 3 5-inch/38 mount and replacing it with ideally two twin Bofors 40 mm guns (1.6 in): sacrificing 20% of the anti-surface gun battery was preferable to a third of the torpedo battery. Generally between four and seven 20 mm Oerlikon (0.79 in) mounts were installed, with the intended fit three forward of the bridge and two abreast the second funnel. Due to early shortages of Bofors mounts most of the class was not fully refitted until 1944, thus additional Oerlikons were installed in 1942–1943 in the intended Bofors positions. As weight compensation, the bridge wings were cut back, tripod foremast replaced by a pole mast, and several other elements eliminated, including the mainmast, torpedo tube blast shields, gun shelter on the after deckhouse, and the potato locker.

In January 1945, as part of the anti-Kamikaze refit program, removal of the two waist torpedo tubes was authorized, providing enough weight margin to replace the two 40 mm twin mounts with quads. Ultimately only Lamson was modified to this configuration. In June, removal of the third centerline tube was authorized to make way for two 40 mm twin mounts abreast of the aft stack for a total of two quad and two twin mounts. All Oerlikons were removed except two mounts forward of the bridge, upgraded from singles to twins. Only Shaw received the twelve Bofors configuration, and when inclined after the refit she was found to be too top-heavy and had to land one of her 5-inch/38s. (Note: This was the mount in the X position, No. 4 when she was a five-gun ship but re-designated No. 3 when she became a four-gun ship.) This largely negated the improved anti-aircraft armament and Commander Destroyers Pacific insisted she be reassigned to the Atlantic Fleet. All ships receiving these AA modifications were to have additional directors installed with their new 40 mm mounts; these Mark 51s were to be replaced by new blind-firing GFFC Mark 63 installations with radar, but Shaw at minimum retained four Mark 51s.

There were some unique modifications to individual ships, but the most noteworthy are the rebuilt Cassin and Downes. The original hulls were damaged beyond repair at Pearl Harbor and scrapped, but the machinery and main batteries were largely undamaged and installed in two new-built hulls at Mare Island. These rebuilt ships retained only two quadruple torpedo tubes (both mounted on the centerline above the main deck) and had six rather than five Oerlikons (four rather than three on the bridge), but otherwise had the same four 5-inch/38s and two twin Bofors of a typical Mahan in 1943/1944. These ships also had a new British-style bridge like those being mounted on 5-inch destroyer escorts, rebuilt 1,850 ton "leaders", and the new Sumner class destroyers. These were also the only two Mahans to mount the Mark 37 director for their 5-inch guns.

== Dunlap class ==
The Dunlap class was a two-ship destroyer class based on the Mahan design, listed as a separate class in some sources. The ships were USS Dunlap (DD-384) and USS Fanning (DD-385), the last two Mahans. Unlike the Mahans, the Dunlaps had the new Mark 25 enclosed mounts for the two forward 5-inch/38 caliber guns, with base rings housing projectile hoists that rotated with each of the guns; their ammunition was fed from a handling room below each mount. Dunlap and Fanning were the first US destroyers to use enclosed forward gun mounts rather than shields; their light pole foremast and lack of a mainmast visibly distinguished them from the Mahans.

== Construction ==
The construction of the first sixteen vessels was authorised under the NIRA Executive Order on 16 June 1933. The last two were authorised under the Vinson-Trammell Act of 27 March 1934 (as part of a group of 95 destroyers authorised on that date—and covered DD-380 to DD-436 and DD-445 to DD-482). The contracts for the first six Mahans were awarded to three shipbuilders, but none of the builders had what the US Navy judged as an acceptable in-house design structure. On the strength of their reputation, the New York firm of Gibbs & Cox was named as the design agent. The firm had no experience in the design of warships, but had successfully designed passenger-cargo liners with better propulsion systems than any available to the US Navy. The decision was made to design the Mahan class and future classes around a new generation of machinery. This included a cheaper, faster and more efficient propulsion system, which combined increases in steam pressure and temperature with a new type of lightweight, fast-running turbine and double reduction gears.

== Ships in class ==
Note Cassin and Downes in this table have two different builders, keel laying dates, and launch dates. Both ships were severely damaged at Pearl Harbor with their hulls damaged beyond repair. Their machinery, however, was nearly intact, and this was shipped to Mare Island Naval Shipyard to be installed in two new-built hulls. The original hulls were scrapped in Pearl Harbor, but the new-built hulls retained the same names and hull numbers as the original ships.

Dunlap and Fanning are sometimes considered the Dunlap class (see above).

Ships of the Mahan destroyer class
Name	Hull no.	Builder	Laid down	Launched	Commissioned	Decommissioned	Fate	Source
Mahan	DD-364	United Dry Dock, Inc.	12 June 1934	15 October 1935	18 September 1936	—N/a	Severely damaged on 7 December 1944 by kamikaze attack; abandoned and sunk by a US destroyer	
Cummings	DD-365	United Dry Dock, Inc.	26 June 1934	11 December 1935	25 November 1936	14 December 1945	Sold on 17 July 1947	
Drayton	DD-366	Bath Iron Works	20 March 1934	26 March 1936	1 September 1936	9 October 1945	Sold for scrap on 20 December 1946	
Lamson	DD-367	Bath Iron Works	20 March 1934	17 June 1936	21 October 1936	29 July 1946	Sunk in the 1946 Operation Crossroads nuclear tests at Bikini Atoll	
Flusser	DD-368	Federal Shipbuilding	4 June 1934	28 September 1935	1 October 1936	16 December 1946	Sold on 6 January 1948	
Reid	DD-369	Federal Shipbuilding	25 June 1934	11 January 1936	2 November 1936	—N/a	Sunk on 11 December 1944 by kamikazes	
Case	DD-370	Boston Navy Yard	19 September 1934	14 September 1935	15 September 1936	13 December 1945	Ship sold on 31 December 1947	
Conyngham	DD-371	Boston Navy Yard	19 September 1934	14 September 1935	4 November 1936	20 December 1946	Used in Operation Crossroads in 1946 and destroyed by sinking in July 1948	
Cassin	DD-372	Philadelphia Navy Yard	1 October 1934	28 October 1935	21 August 1936	7 December 1941	Hull scrapped Pearl Harbor October 1942. Machinery salvaged, shipped to Mare Island, and installed in a new hull.	
Cassin	DD-372	Mare Island Navy Yard	20 November 1942	21 June 1943	5 February 1944	17 December 1945	Sold for scrap on 25 November 1947	
Shaw	DD-373	Philadelphia Navy Yard	1 October 1934	28 October 1935	18 September 1936	2 October 1945	Scrapped in July 1946	
Tucker	DD-374	Norfolk Navy Yard	15 August 1934	26 February 1936	23 July 1936	—N/a	Struck mine on 2 August 1942; exploded and sank	
Downes	DD-375	Norfolk Navy Yard	15 August 1934	22 April 1936	15 January 1937	20 June 1942	Hull scrapped Pearl Harbor August 1942. Machinery salvaged, shipped to Mare Island, and installed in a new hull.	
Downes	DD-375	Mare Island Navy Yard	13 October 1942	20 May 1943	15 November 1943	17 December 1945	Sold for scrap on 18 November 1947	
Cushing	DD-376	Puget Sound Navy Yard	15 August 1934	31 December 1935	28 August 1936	—N/a	Sunk during Naval Battle of Guadalcanal on 13 November 1942	
Perkins	DD-377	Puget Sound Navy Yard	15 November 1934	31 December 1935	18 September 1936	—N/a	Sunk on 29 November 1943, when rammed by an Australian troopship	
Smith	DD-378	Mare Island Navy Yard	27 October 1934	20 February 1936	19 September 1936	28 June 1946	Struck from US Navy records on 25 February 1947	
Preston	DD-379	Mare Island Navy Yard	27 October 1934	22 April 1936	27 October 1936	—N/a	Sunk during Naval Battle of Guadalcanal 14 November 1942	
Dunlap	DD-384	United Dry Dock, Inc.	10 April 1935	18 April 1936	12 June 1937	14 December 1945	Sold on 31 December 1947	
Fanning	DD-385	United Dry Dock, Inc.	10 April 1935	18 September 1936	8 October 1937	14 December 1945	Decommissioned 14 December 1945 and later sold.	

== Service history ==
=== Mahan ===
USS Mahan was commissioned on the east coast in September 1936 and served in the Atlantic area until July 1937. She sailed to the Southern California coast for fleet training before moving on to Pearl Harbor. At sea when the Japanese attacked Pearl Harbor on 7 December 1941, Mahan participated in the initial post-attack efforts in search of the strike force. The ship joined Task Force 17 in February 1942, which conducted raids on several atolls in the Marshall and Gilbert Islands. Late in March, she returned to Pearl Harbor and proceeded to the west coast for overhaul. By August 1942, Mahan was back operating out of Pearl Harbor.

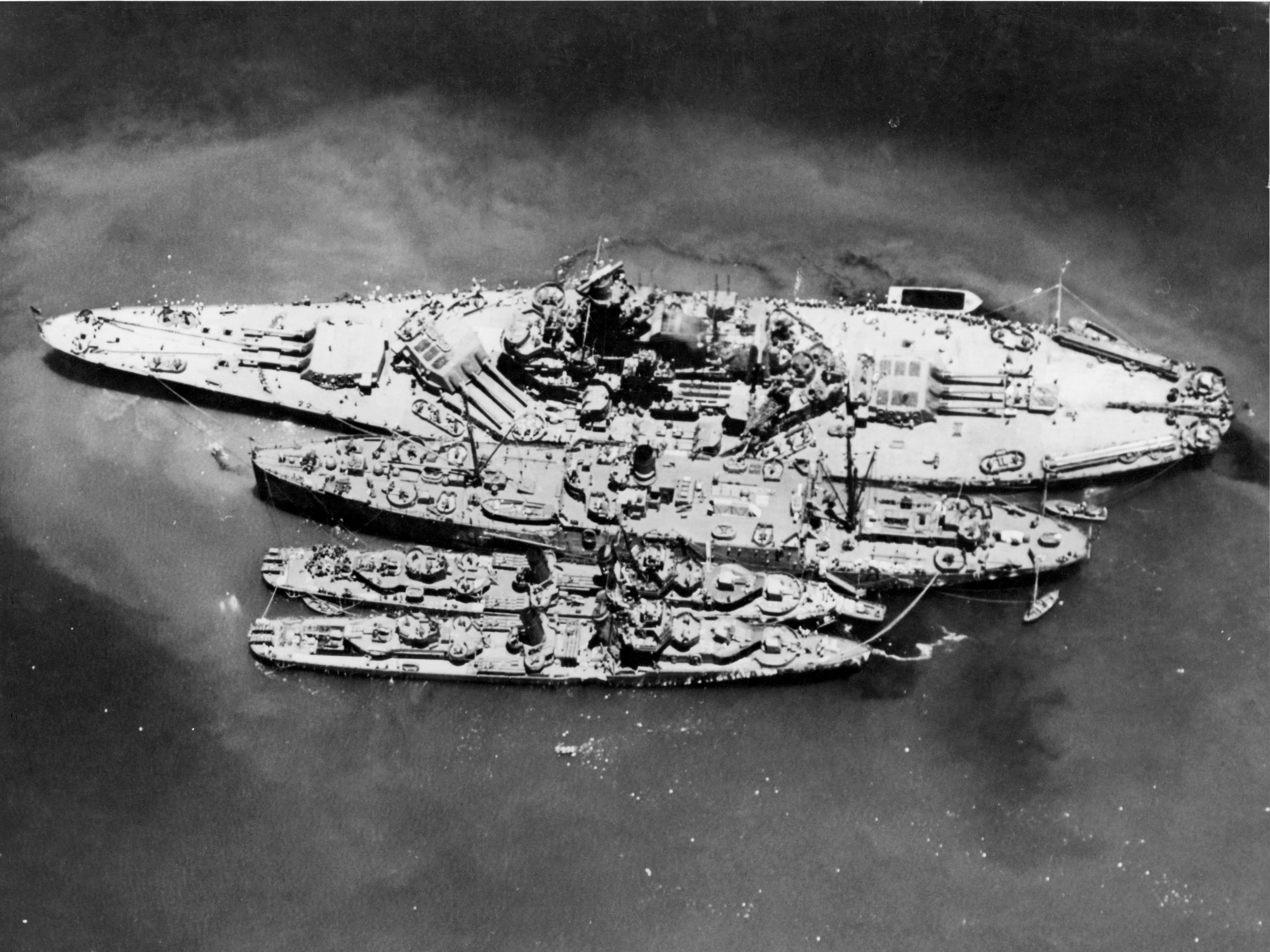
South Dakota, Navy repair ship, Mahan (damaged bow), and Lamson, after South Dakota – Mahan collision, following the Battle of Santa Cruz Islands

In October 1942, Mahan was assigned to Task Force 61 and took part in the Battle of the Santa Cruz Islands. The engagement cost the Navy 74 aircraft, the aircraft carrier Hornet, and one destroyer. While en route to Nouméa, New Caledonia, Mahan and the battleship South Dakota collided, causing severe damage to both ships. Temporary repairs were made to Mahan and she steamed to Pearl Harbor for a new bow. She pulled out of Pearl Harbor in January 1943. In the months to follow, Mahan escorted convoys between New Hebrides and the Fiji Islands, performed patrol assignments off New Caledonia and engaged in operations in Australian waters. Assigned to the amphibious force of Rear Admiral Daniel E. Barbey, Mahan participated in a succession of wide-ranging amphibious campaigns in New Guinea and New Britain. In February and March 1944, she saw action with the 7th Fleet in the Admiralty Islands. After that the ship was ordered back to the west coast for an overhaul, leaving the yard in July 1944 for Pearl Harbor.

Returning to New Guinea, Mahan began to escort convoys between Hollandia, in Indonesia and Leyte, in the Philippine Islands. By November 1944, she was doing anti-submarine patrols off Leyte. On 7 December 1944 while patrolling the channel between Leyte and Ponson Island, a group of Japanese suicide aircraft overwhelmed Mahan at Ormoc Bay. She was disabled by the attack, then abandoned and sunk by a US destroyer. Mahan received five battle stars for her World War II service.

=== Cummings ===
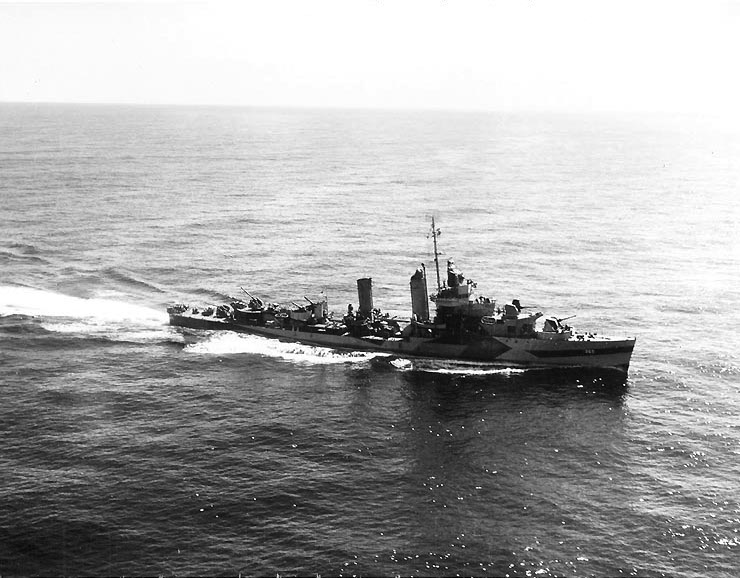
Cummings underway in 1944

USS Cummings served in the Pacific Fleet in the late 1930s, participating in numerous individual and fleet training exercises. In 1940, she served on security patrols off the west coast. Cummings went on a goodwill visit to several ports in the South Pacific, including Auckland, New Zealand, and Tahiti. The destroyer was hit by fragments while docked in Pearl Harbor during the Japanese attack, and suffered a few casualties. She escorted convoys between Pearl Harbor and the west coast for the first six months of World War II. In June 1942, she was transferred to convoy escort duties in the South Pacific until August, when she had an overhaul in San Francisco, and then returned to her role as a convoy escort in the South Pacific.

In January 1944, Cummings joined the screen for the Fast Carrier Strike Force while it raided Japanese positions in the Central Pacific. In March, Cummings sailed for Trincomalee, Ceylon, where she rendezvoused with British ships for exercises. In April, the ship joined a British force to screen during air strikes on Sabang, Indonesia. She returned to Ceylon in May and then moved on to Exmouth Gulf, Australia. With a British force, Cummings sortied for air strikes on Soerabaja, Java, before leaving for Pearl Harbor.

By July she was back in San Francisco to escort the heavy cruiser Baltimore, the ship that carried President Franklin D. Roosevelt to Pearl Harbor. Cummings joined the US 3rd Fleet for the Battle of Leyte Gulf in October 1944. The next month, she bombarded Iwo Jima in preparation for the amphibious assault on the island. The ship operated off Okinawa during its invasion. After the war, Cummings returned to the United States and was decommissioned in December 1945 and sold for scrap in July 1947. She received seven battle stars for her World War II service.

=== Drayton ===
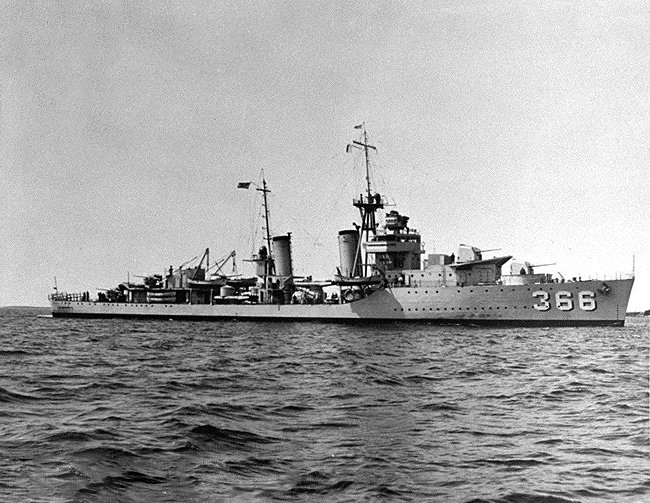
Drayton underway in 1936

USS Drayton made her shakedown cruise to Europe late in 1936, and finished her final trials in the United States. She left Norfolk, Virginia, in June 1937 for San Diego, California, to join the Scouting Force. In July, Drayton participated in the search for the lost American pilot, Amelia Earhart. For the next two years, she exercised along the west coast, the Hawaiian Islands, and the Caribbean. When the Japanese attacked Pearl Harbor, Drayton was at sea but able to participate in the post-attack efforts in search of the enemy force. During the succeeding three months, she escorted a convoy to Christmas Island, scored the first verified sinking of a Japanese submarine, (Kiritimati), screened a carrier in an airstrike on Bougainville Island, and screened a tanker to Suva Harbor, Fiji Islands. In late November 1942 Drayton became part of Task Force 67, which intercepted a Japanese naval force guarding transports en route to resupply Guadalcanal. The Battle of Tassafaronga followed.

Throughout June, July and August 1943, Drayton escorted Australian troop carriers from Townsville, Australia, to Milne Bay, New Guinea. In early September, the ship supported the amphibious landing at Lae, New Guinea. Later in September, she participated in the amphibious landing at Finschhafen, New Guinea. After escorting troops to Arawe, New Britain, in December 1943, Drayton participated in the landings there and at Borgen Bay, near Cape Gloucester, New Britain. The destroyer took part in the invasion of Los Negros Island in the Admiralty Islands during February 1944. She reported to the 7th Fleet in October and performed patrol and escort duty in Leyte Gulf. In December 1944, while screening a convoy to San Pedro Bay in the Philippines, a Japanese bomber attacked the ship, killing two men and wounding seven. The next day, she fought off enemy fighters; one crashed into a 5"/38 caliber gun mount, killing six men and wounding twelve. By August 1945 she was on her way to New York, arriving in September. Drayton was decommissioned in October 1945 and sold for scrap in December 1946. She received 11 battle stars for her World War II service.

=== Lamson ===
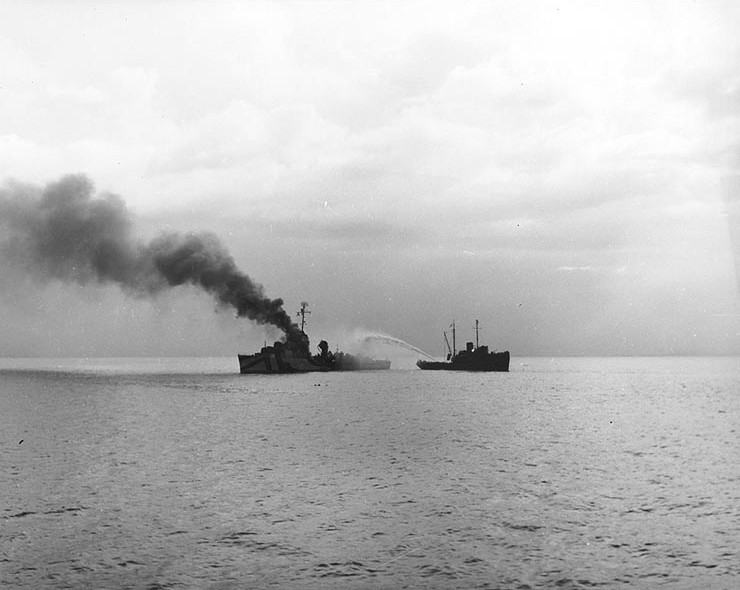
Lamson on fire at Ormoc Bay, Philippine Islands, December 1944

USS Lamson shipped out of Norfolk, Virginia, in June 1937 for San Diego, California, less than a year after her naval service began. She engaged in exercises and tactical training until sailing for Pearl Harbor in October 1939. For the next two years, Lamson continued training from her base in Hawaii. Following the attack on Pearl Harbor, she joined the post-attack efforts to search for the Japanese strike force. In February 1942 she became part of the newly formed ANZAC Squadron, consisting of Australian, New Zealand, and American warships in Suva, Fiji Islands. In March, she operated with the squadron as a cover group southeast of Papua New Guinea. In late November 1942, Lamson was assigned to Task Force 67 and took part in the Battle of Tassafaronga.

For the next eight months, Lamson screened convoys en route to Guadalcanal. By August 1943, she had moved on to Milne Bay, New Guinea, and participated in the September amphibious landings at Lae and Finschhafen. In December, the ship engaged in the pre-invasion bombardment of Arawe and landings at Cape Gloucester, New Britain. After an overhaul and training at Pearl Harbor, Lamson joined the 7th Fleet in October 1944. In early December 1944, she took part in the amphibious landing at Ormoc Bay, Leyte, Philippine Islands. There she was struck by a kamikaze that set fire to the ship, killing 21 men and injuring 50. The fires were extinguished by a rescue tug and Lamson was saved. After extensive repairs in the Puget Sound Naval Shipyard, she returned to the Pacific and operated off Iwo Jima, then sailed to the United States in November 1945. In May 1946, she participated in the Able nuclear test of Operation Crossroads; she was sunk in the Baker test in July 1946. Lamson received five battle stars for her World War II service.

=== Flusser ===
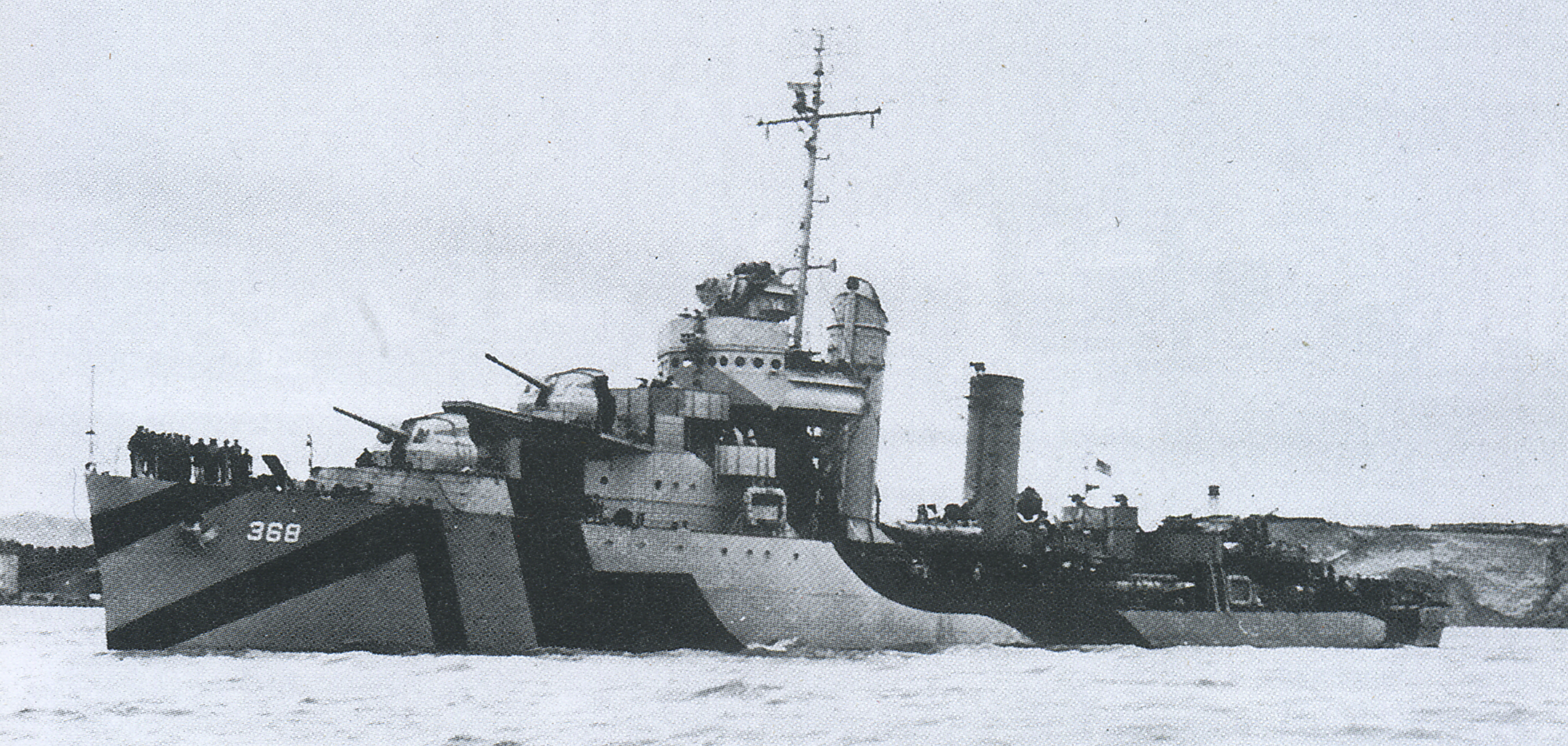
Flusser in June 1944, painted in disruptive camouflage

USS Flusser steamed her way to San Diego, California, in July 1937, after spending the first months of her naval service in the Atlantic and Mediterranean. She was based in San Diego until 1939, then reassigned to Pearl Harbor. Flusser was at sea when the Japanese struck Pearl Harbor, but took part in the post-attack search. For the next six months, she carried out convoy duty between Pearl Harbor and the west coast, and engaged in escort and patrol duty out of southwest Pacific ports. From July 1942 to February 1943, Flusser was in overhaul status at Pearl Harbor. She returned to escort and training operations in the Solomon Islands and was later based at Milne Bay, New Guinea. During September, Flusser was part of the amphibious landing forces at Lae and Finschhafen, New Guinea. In December 1943, the destroyer participated in the bombardment and landings at Arawe and Cape Gloucester, New Britain. While attached to the 7th Fleet in February, she supported the landing of troops at Los Negros Island in the Admiralty Islands. Between April and June 1944, the ship was in the Mare Island Naval Shipyard for overhaul.

After her overhaul, Flusser returned to Pearl Harbor. In August, she escorted a convoy to Eniwetok and moved on to Majuro in the Marshall Islands, where she patrolled bypassed Japanese-held atolls. On a patrol off Wotje Atoll, the ship was fired on by a shore battery that left nine of her crew members wounded. In October, she sailed north to San Pedro Bay for duty in the Leyte Gulf and Surigao Strait. By early December 1944, Flusser had escorted convoys from Hollandia Jayapura to Leyte and taken part in the amphibious landing at Ormoc Bay. In March 1945, Flusser provided escort support for the landing near Cebu in the Philippines. During July she participated in the Balikpapan campaign in Borneo, escorting ships and covering the landing. After occupation duty in Okinawa during September and October, she sailed to San Diego, California, arriving in November 1945. During 1946, Flusser took part in the atomic weapons tests in the Marshall Islands. From there, she steamed to Pearl Harbor, then to Norfolk, Virginia. The destroyer was decommissioned there in December 1946 and sold in January 1948. Flusser received eight battle stars for her World War II service.

=== Reid ===
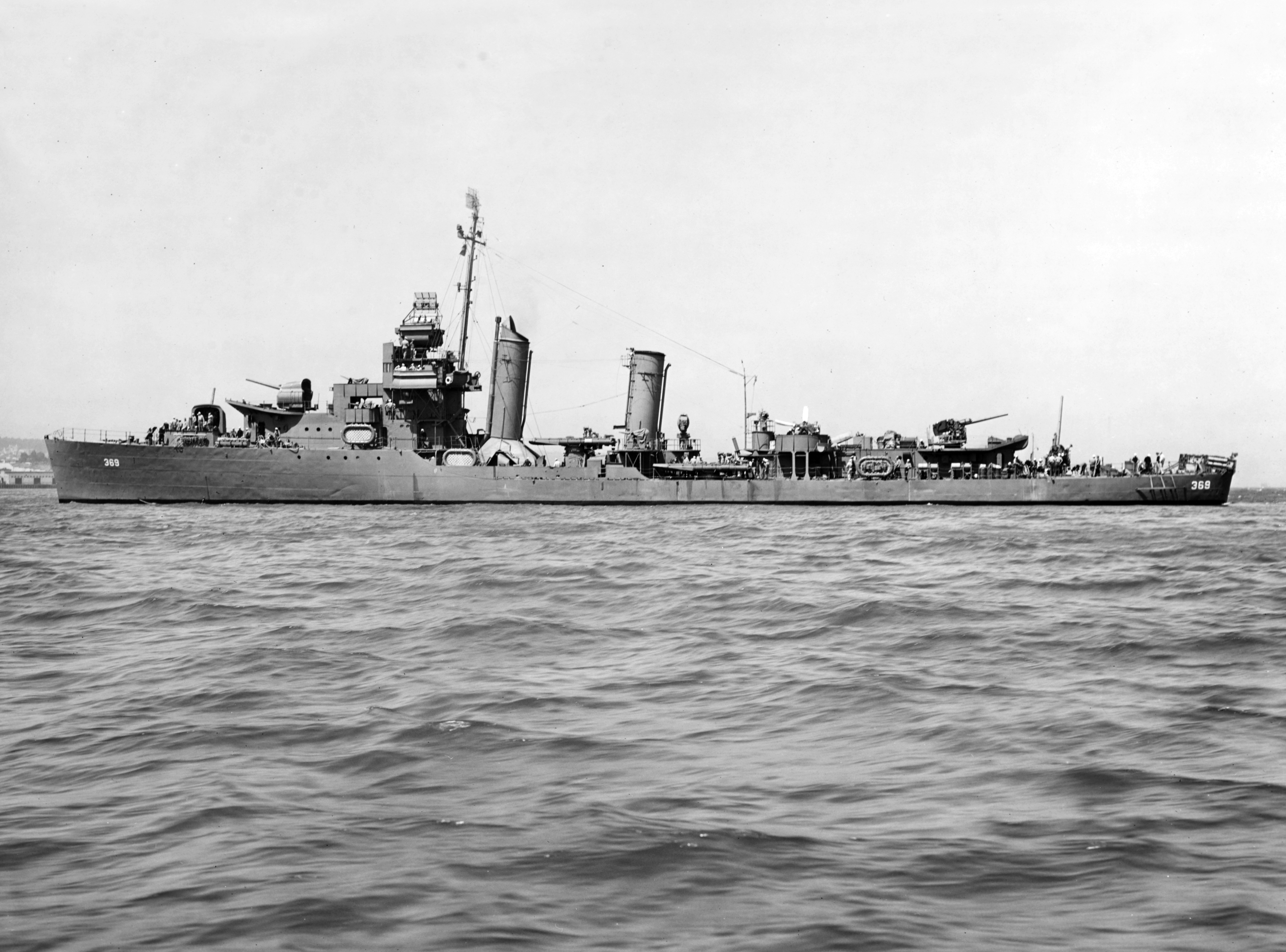
Reid off Mare Island in 1943

USS Reid came into naval service in November 1936. From 1937 until 1941, she participated in training and fleet maneuvers in the Atlantic and Pacific. Reid was berthed at Pearl Harbor when the Japanese attacked, but escaped without damage while her gunners fired at the enemy attackers. After the attack, Reid did patrol duty in the Hawaiian waters, and later escorted convoys to San Francisco, California. Late in May 1942, Reid steamed north from Pearl Harbor to bombard the Japanese positions in Kiska and supported landings at Adak, Alaska. While conducting an anti-submarine patrol in August, she brought a Japanese submarine to the surface with a heavy depth charge barrage, and opened fire on it until it capsized and sank. Five of the submarine's crew survived and were rescued by Reid. By October, she was patrolling the waters near New Caledonia, Samoa, and the Fiji Islands. In January 1943, the ship bombarded several Japanese locations on Guadalcanal.

During September 1943, Reid provided support for the landings at Lae and Finschhafen, New Guinea. In December, Reid escorted troop transports for the landings at Arawe, New Britain, and participated in the landings at Cape Gloucester, New Britain. In the following months she supported landings at Los Negros Island in the Admiralty Islands, Hollandia Jayapura, Wakde Island, Biak, and Noemfoor, New Guinea. Reid supported air strikes against Wake Island, and in November 1944 did patrol duty off Leyte in the Philippines.

On 11 December 1944, Reid was operating with a convoy bound for Ormoc Bay, Leyte, to resupply land forces. Late that afternoon, a group of Japanese planes descended on the convoy and penetrated the defenses, taking aim at Reid and another destroyer. The destroyers put up an anti-aircraft barrage that downed some of the planes and damaged others, but Reid was hit by five suicide planes, causing powerful explosions. Within minutes, she went to the bottom with over a hundred of her men. Reid received seven battle stars for her World War II service.

=== Case ===
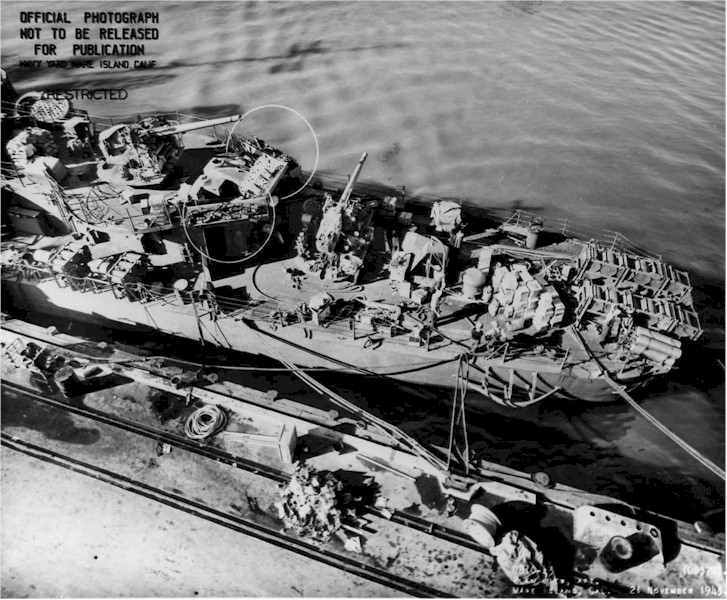
Case's stern, showing the 5 inch guns at Mare Island in November 1943

USS Case began active duty in September 1936 and was assigned to the Pacific Fleet. In April 1940, Pearl Harbor became her home base. The following year, she participated in fleet exercises to Midway Island, Johnston Island, Palmyra Atoll, Samoa, and Auckland. Case was berthed at Pearl Harbor when the Japanese struck, but sustained no damage. After the attack, she escorted convoys between the west coast and Pearl Harbor until late May 1942. Case went north to support the pre-invasion bombardment of Kiska and do patrol duty off Adak, Alaska. In October, the ship escorted a convoy to Pearl Harbor and then headed to the states for repair, returning to Pearl Harbor in November. In January 1943, she sailed to Espiritu Santo for training and remained there until September. After overhaul in San Francisco, California, Case returned to Pearl Harbor in December 1943. She proceeded to the Marshall Islands, taking part in attacks on Wotje Atoll and Maloelap Atoll in late January and Eniwetok in early February 1944.

In April 1944, Case took part in air raids on Hollandia, Truk (Chuuk Lagoon), Satawan, and Ponape Island. Her next assignment was with Task Group 58.4, participating in strikes on Japanese airfields in the Bonin Islands. During June 1944, Case engaged in raids on the Mariana Islands and Vulcan Islands. Following repair work at Eniwetok, the ship resumed operations with the task group, screening for air strikes in July and for attacks on the Bonin Islands in August and September. She took part in the bombardment of Marcus Island before joining Task Group 38.1 for strikes on Luzon. While screening US cruisers bound for Saipan, Case rammed and sank a Japanese midget submarine. Undamaged, she sailed to Saipan for offshore patrol duty until early December 1944. Afterward, Case became involved in a raid on Iwo Jima airfields and helped sink two Japanese ships. Following repairs at Saipan, she patrolled between there and Iwo Jima until the end of the war. She then left Iwo Jima for Norfolk, Virginia, where she was decommissioned in December 1945 and sold in December 1947. Case received seven battle stars for her World War II service.

=== Conyngham ===
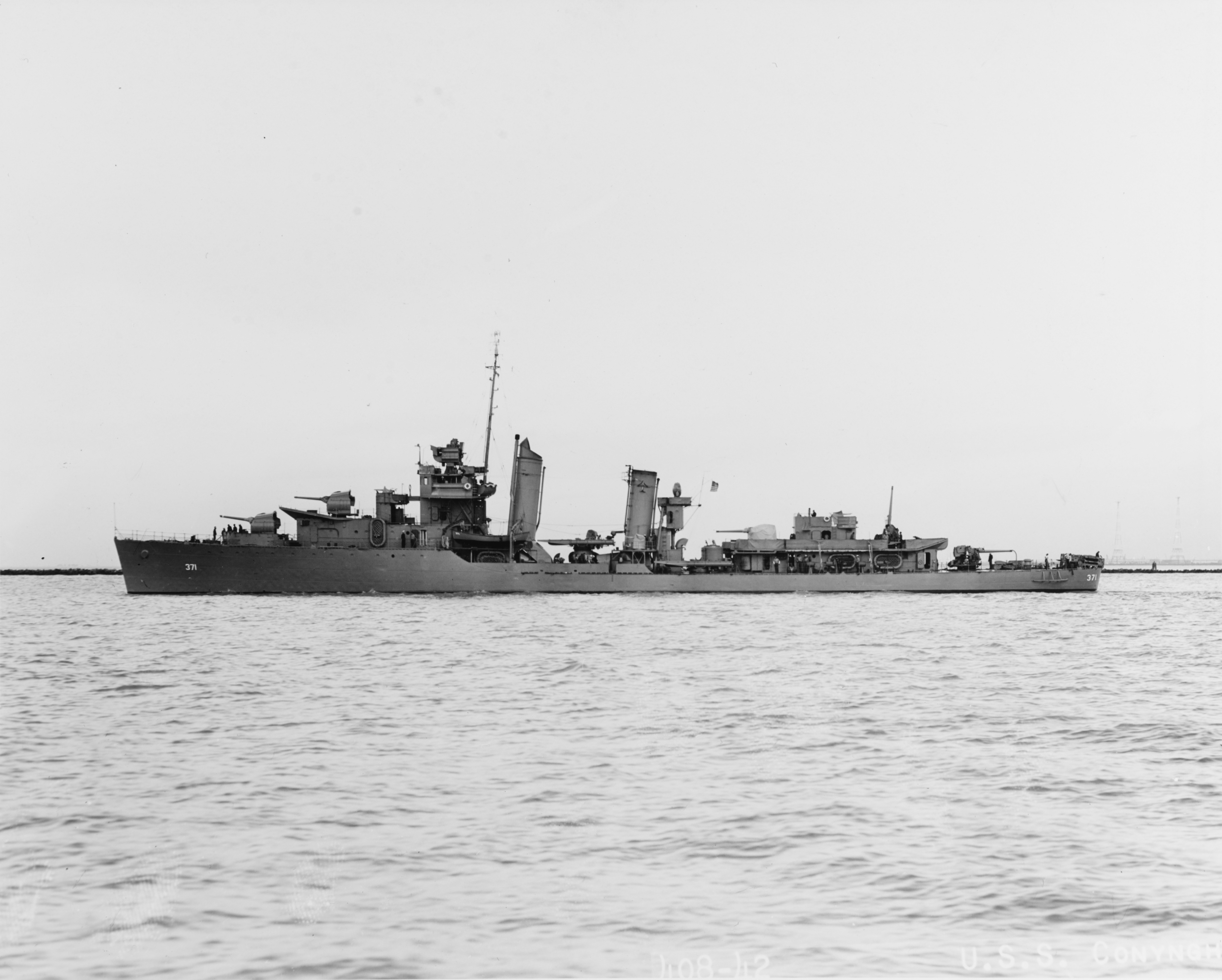
Conyngham off Mare Island January 1942

USS Conyngham made her maiden voyage to northern Europe in early 1937, shortly after being commissioned. Following an overhaul in Boston, she sailed to San Diego, California. From October 1937 until April 1940, Conyngham operated along the west coast, the Hawaiian Islands and the Caribbean, then made her way to Pearl Harbor. In March 1941, Conyngham left Pearl Harbor on a goodwill tour to Samoa, Sydney and Brisbane in Australia, and Suva in Fiji, returning in April 1941. Undamaged by the Japanese attack on Pearl Harbor, she put to sea on patrol duty that continued through December. After a brief overhaul at the Mare Island Naval Shipyard, Conyngham performed escort duty between the west coast and New Hebrides. Her escort assignment was interrupted to screen carriers in the Battle of Midway Island in June 1942.

During October 1942, Conyngham participated in the Battle of the Santa Cruz Islands and supported the attack at the Matanikau River, Guadalcanal. In June 1943 she joined an amphibious force that later carried out landings at Lae and Finschhafen, New Guinea. In December, she took part in the landings at Arawe and Cape Gloucester, New Britain. The next month, Conyngham participated in the landing at Saidor, New Guinea, and sailed to San Francisco for overhaul. Returning to duty in May 1944, she screened battleships in the Mariana Islands and remained there until August. Conyngham then joined a convoy screening ships to the Philippines Islands, arriving at Leyte Gulf in early November 1944. There, a floatplane (a type of seaplane) strafed her, wounding 17 men yet causing slight damage to the ship. By early December, she had covered landings at Ormoc Bay and helped with reinforcements. Conygnham left the Philippines late in December for Manus Island, New Guinea, to replenish supplies. Later on, she helped screen a convoy to Leyte for the landings at Lingayen Gulf. The ship participated in bombardments at Lingayen Gulf and remained on patrol there after the landings in January 1945. Conygham sailed to Subic Bay for overhaul in late July 1945, and remained there until the end of the war. Decommissioned in December 1946, Conyngham was used in the atomic weapons test at Bikini in 1946, and was scuttled in July 1948. She received 14 battle stars for her World War II service.

=== Cassin ===
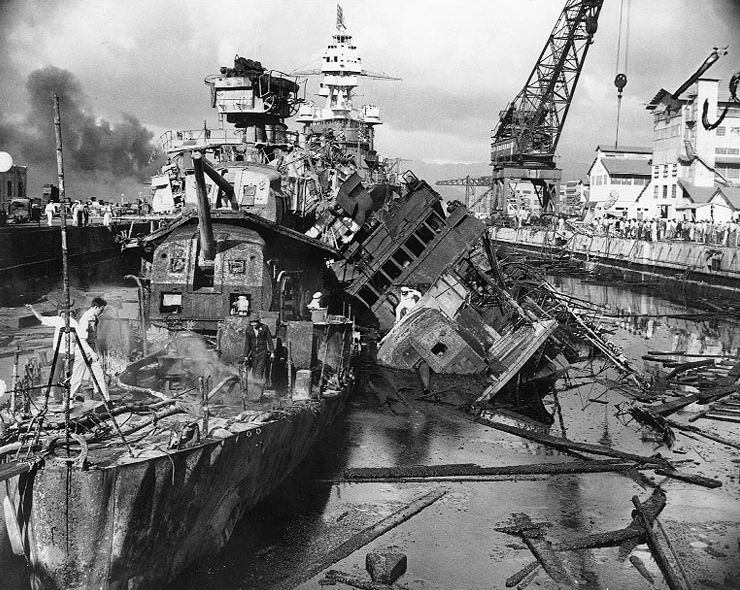
Cassin (capsized, right) and Downes (left) at Pearl Harbor 7 December 1941, shortly after the Japanese attack

USS Cassin began naval service in August 1936, but alterations kept her from sea duty until March 1937. The next year, she joined the forces at Pearl Harbor for annual fleet exercises. In April 1940, Cassin was assigned to a Hawaiian unit. When the Japanese attacked Pearl Harbor, Cassin was in dry-dock with the battleship Pennsylvania and the destroyer Downes. Both destroyers were at the southern end of the dock when an incendiary bomb struck Downes, starting unstoppable fires on both destroyers. Cassin slipped off her blocks and rolled over onto the burning Downes. She was salvaged and towed to the Mare Island Navy Yard and decommissioned.

Cassin was rebuilt and commissioned again in February 1944. She reported to Pearl Harbor in April and pulled escort duty until August. In October, the ship took part in the shelling of Marcus Island to destroy enemy installations. After participating in the bombardment of Iwo Jima in November 1944 and January 1945, she escorted an ammunition ship to the newly invaded Iwo Jima. There, Cassin did radar picket and air-sea rescue duty.

With the war over, she took part in guarding the air evacuation of released prisoners of war from Japan. In November 1945, the ship deployed to Norfolk, Virginia, and decommissioned there in December 1945. She was sold for scrap in November 1947. Cassin received six battle stars for her World War II service.

=== Shaw ===
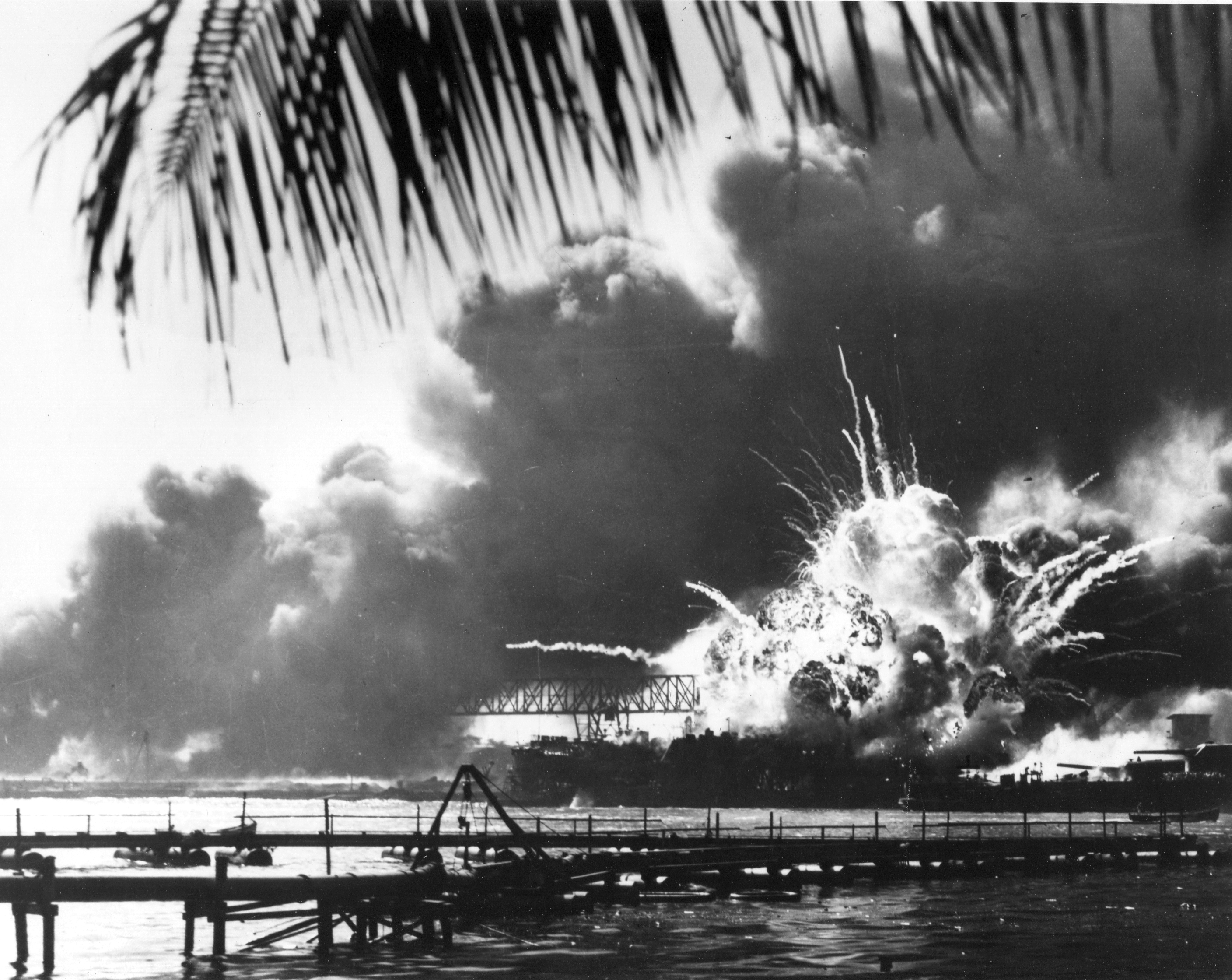
Shaw exploding during Japanese raid on Pearl Harbor 7 December 1941

USS Shaw crossed the Atlantic on her shakedown cruise in April 1937, and returned to the Philadelphia Navy Yard in June. There, she began a year of yard work before completing acceptance trials. For the remainder of the year, the ship conducted training exercises in the Atlantic. Sailing to the west coast, she was at the Mare Island Navy Yard from January to April 1939. By April 1940, Shaw moved on to Hawaiian waters, then back to the west coast in November for overhaul. She returned to Hawaii in February 1941, and later entered the Pearl Harbor Navy Yard for repairs. Shaw was still in dry dock when the Japanese attacked, with most of the ship's crew ashore. She was hit by three bombs and severely damaged when her forward magazine exploded. Temporary repairs were made at Pearl Harbor, and in February 1942 the ship sailed to the west coast to complete them.

With repairs completed, Shaw returned to Pearl Harbor in August 1942. She was then assigned to Task Force 61, and took part in the Battle of Santa Cruz Islands in mid-October. Reassigned to a unit of the 7th Amphibious Force, Shaw escorted reinforcements to Lae and Finschhafen, New Guinea, for the remainder of October and part of November. In late December, she escorted units engaged in the assault on Cape Gloucester, New Britain, and sustained casualties and damage. Thirty-six men were injured; three later died of their wounds. Temporary repairs were made at Milne Bay, New Guinea, and permanent repairs were completed at San Francisco in May 1944. Shaw then returned to Pearl Harbor.

With Task Force 52, she participated in the offensive to gain possession of the Japanese-held Mariana Islands. In January 1945, with the San Fabian Attack Force, Shaw saw action at Manila Bay in the Philippine Islands. She returned to the United States in April, stopping first at San Francisco for repairs, then routed to New York via Philadelphia for deactivation. The ship was decommissioned in October 1945 and sold for scrap in July 1946. Shaw received 11 battle stars for her World War II service.

=== Tucker ===
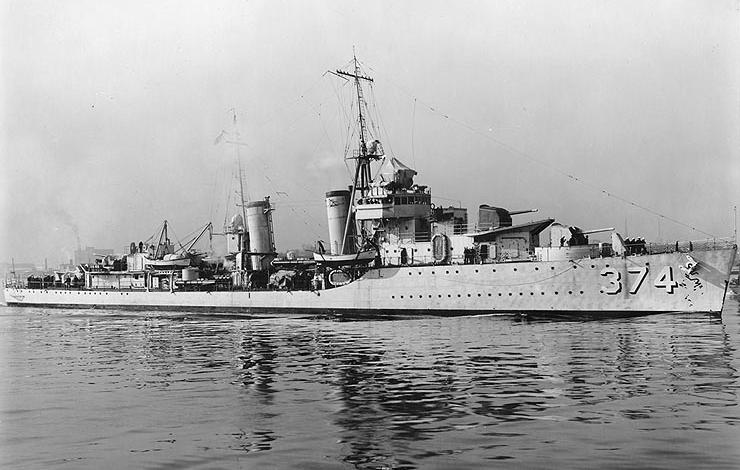
Tucker off the Norfolk Navy Yard in 1937

USS Tucker was commissioned in July 1936. After her shakedown cruise, she joined the destroyer forces attached to the US Battle Fleet based in San Diego, California. In February 1939 the ship took part in a naval exercise in the Caribbean, personally observed by President Franklin D. Roosevelt from the cruiser Houston. After exercises in Hawaiian waters in early 1940, Tucker operated between the west coast and Hawaii until the end of the year. By February 1941, she was back in Pearl Harbor. Tucker went on a goodwill tour that included Auckland, during March, before returning to Pearl Harbor. There, she participated in exercises at sea before sailing on to San Diego. By November 1941, Tucker was once again in Pearl Harbor. When the Japanese attacked, the ship was berthed at East Loch undergoing tender overhaul. She was undamaged, and returned fire on the Japanese forces.

After the hostilities, Tucker patrolled off Pearl Harbor, then spent the next five months escorting convoys between the west coast and Hawaii. She later escorted the tender Wright to Tutuila in American Samoa, Suva in the Fiji Islands, and Nouméa in New Caledonia. The ship then escorted Wright back to Suva, arriving there in June 1942. From Suva, she escorted the cargo ship Nira Luckenbach to Espiritu Santo, New Hebrides, in August. The ship entered the harbor by the western entrance and struck at least one mine. The crew abandoned ship and was rescued by nearby vessels. Efforts to save her were in vain; she eventually jack-knifed and went to the bottom. Tucker had steamed into a minefield placed by US forces, but she was never informed of its existence. Three men were killed and three more were listed as missing. She was removed from the Navy list in December 1944. Tucker received one battle star for her World War II service.

=== Downes ===
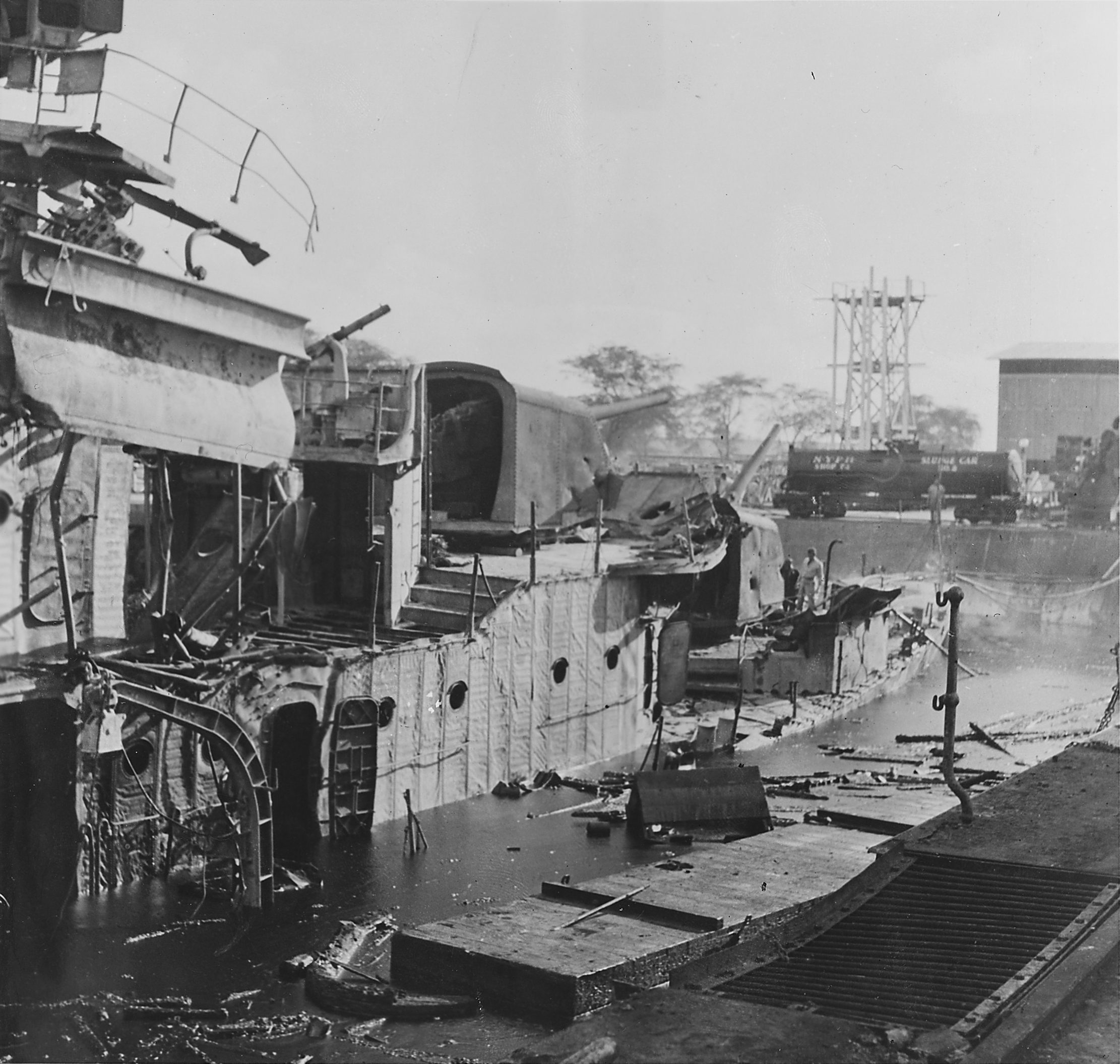
Wreckage of Downes after being hit by bombs during the attack on Pearl Harbor, 7 December 1941

USS Downes entered service in January 1937. The following November, she sailed from Norfolk, Virginia, to San Diego, California. While based there, Downes participated in exercises along the west coast, in the Caribbean and in Hawaiian waters until April 1940. Pearl Harbor then became her homeport. In early 1941, Downes joined a cruise to Samoa, the Fiji Islands, and Australia, then visited the west coast later in the year. When the Japanese attacked Pearl Harbor, Downes was in dry-dock with the battleship Pennsylvania and the destroyer Cassin. Both destroyers were at the southern end of the dock when an incendiary bomb struck Downes, setting unstoppable fires on both ships. Cassin slipped her blocks and rolled over onto the burning Downes, and Downes was later decommissioned.

Downes was rebuilt and recommissioned in November 1943. During March 1944, she escorted a convoy to Pearl Harbor and on to Majuro in the Marshall Islands. By July, Downes began escort duty from Eniwetok to Saipan in support of the invasion of the Mariana Islands. Then she patrolled off Tinian during its invasion, and gave fire support during mop-up operations there. Afterward, Downes took part in the bombardment of Marcus Island to create a diversion and destroy Japanese installations, an action that Admiral Halsey later commended. During the Battle of Leyte Gulf, the ship screened the Fast Carrier Task Force during the air strikes on Vice Admiral Jisaburō Ozawa's Northern Force. Downes served in Iwo Jima from June 1944 until the end of the war, when the ship was ordered to return to the United States, arriving at Norfolk in November 1945. She was decommissioned in December 1945 and sold in November 1947. Downes received four battle stars for her World War II service.

=== Cushing ===
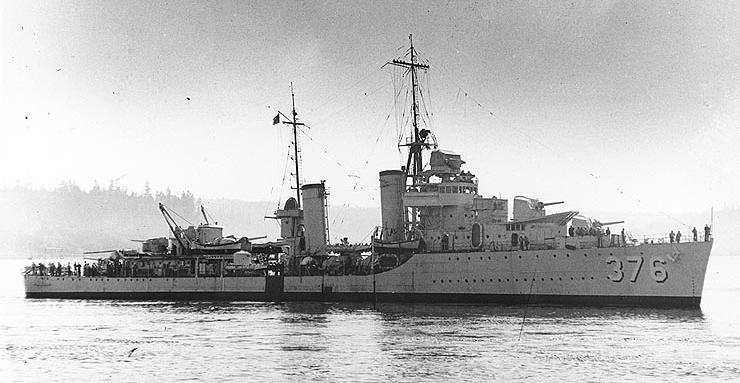
Cushing off Puget Sound Navy Yard, Bremerton – 1936

USS Cushing reported to the Pacific Fleet in August 1936, soon after her Navy service began. She joined the unsuccessful search for the missing Earhart during the month of July 1937. She moved on to San Diego for training exercises, continuing to operate along the west coast for the next several years. Cushing was under overhaul at the Mare Island Navy Yard when the Japanese struck Pearl Harbor. Following the attack, she did convoy duty between the west coast and Pearl Harbor, and later operated off Midway Island on anti-submarine patrol. In August 1942, Cushing sailed to Pearl Harbor for training exercises and later joined operations around Guadalcanal.

With Task Force 61, Cushing took part in the bitterly contested Battle of Santa Cruz in October 1942. Outnumbered, the force stalled the Japanese from their advance toward Guadalcanal. At the Battle of Guadalcanal, Cushing was perhaps the first US ship to strike the enemy on that November day in 1942. In the fighting that followed, she sustained several hits amidships and slowly began to lose power, but was able to fire six torpedoes by local control at the Hiei. In his book, Destroyer Operations in World War II (1953), Theodore Roscoe said, " Three of the "fish" seemed to hit the bulls-eye; if they did, it was with tack-hammer thumps. They may have exploded prematurely. But Hiei's lookouts must have seen them coming, for the big ship swung her bow to the left and lumbered westward, disappearing into the smoke-haze." By this time, Cushing was dead in the water, an easy target for repeated enemy shelling. The results were disastrous and the order was given to abandon ship. Six officers and 53 men were lost. Of the survivors rescued, 56 had been wounded and ten of them suffered fatal injuries. The abandoned ship remained afloat until her magazines blew up. Cushing received three battle stars for her World War II service.

=== Perkins ===
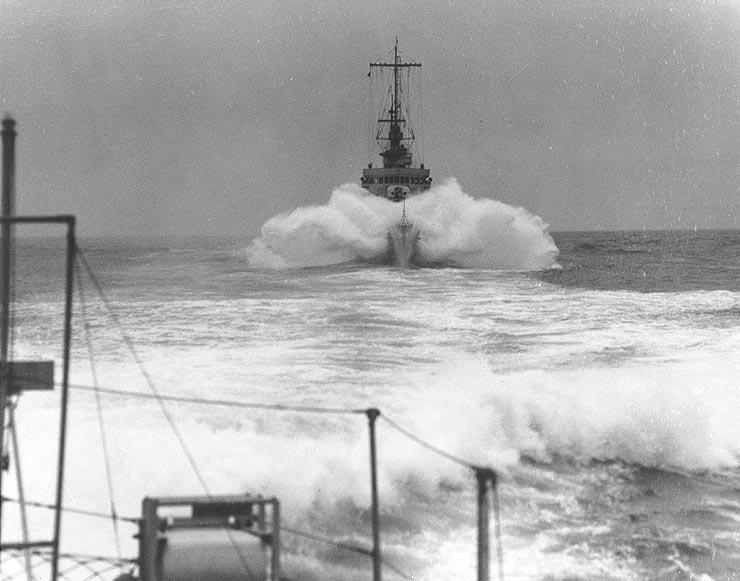
Perkins steaming through heavy seas, August 1937

USS Perkins was commissioned in September 1936 and San Diego, California, became her homeport. She operated in the eastern Pacific prior to World War II, and was at the Mare Island Navy Yard when the Japanese struck Pearl Harbor. In mid-December, she escorted a convoy to Pearl Harbor, returned to Mare Island for new radar gear, and sailed back to Pearl Harbor the latter part of January 1942. The following month, Perkins departed Pearl Harbor and joined Australian, New Zealand, and other US ships in the ANZAC Squadron, charged with protecting the eastern approaches to Australia and New Zealand. She continued operations with ANZAC until April. In May 1942, Perkins participated in the Battle of the Coral Sea. After that, propeller problems took her to New Zealand and to Pearl Harbor, where repairs were completed. While at Pearl Harbor, additional radar gear and 40 mm guns were installed.

By November 1942 Perkins was with Task Force 67, led by Rear Admiral Carleton H. Wright. In the nighttime Battle of Tassafaronga, the force intercepted the Japanese to stop them from supplying Guadalcanal. Undamaged in the encounter, Perkins headed for Tulagi where she bombarded the Guadalcanal coast and served on escort assignments until January 1943. She joined Task Force 76, an amphibious group, in March. In September 1943, Perkins bombarded Lae, New Guinea, and supported the landings there. She took part in the successful landings at Finschhafen, New Guinea. Late in November, the ship was bound from Milne Bay to Buna, steaming independently, when Duntroon, an Australian troopship, accidentally collided with her. Perkins broke in two and quickly sank; nine of the crew went down with her. Perkins received four battle stars for her World War II service.

=== Smith ===
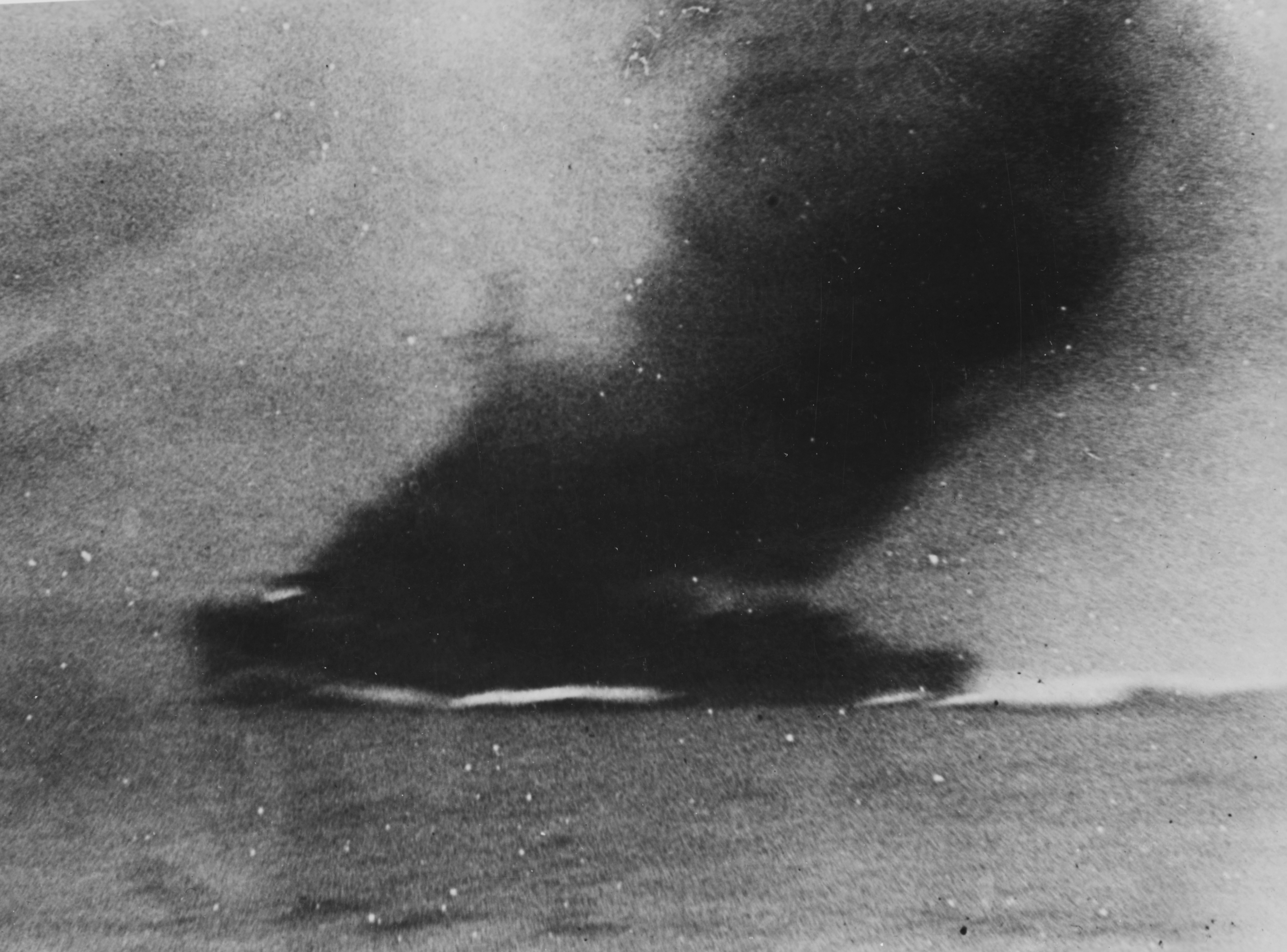
Smith burning after being hit by Japanese torpedo plane, October 1942

USS Smith began her US naval service in September 1936, and operated along the west coast of the United States for the next five years. From the start of World War II until April 1942, she was based in San Francisco, California, attached to a destroyer squadron. In June, Smith was in Pearl Harbor, engaged in training exercises, then escorted a convoy back to San Francisco. After overhaul and sea trials in the bay area, Smith returned to Pearl Harbor in August. By October she was part of Task Force 61, participating in the Battle of Santa Cruz. In the course of the battle, a Japanese torpedo plane crashed into her; the explosion ignited the forward part of the ship. The crew eventually extinguished the fires, and Smith was able to retain her position in the screen. When the air cleared, 28 were dead and 23 wounded. She was patched up enough in New Caledonia to make her way to Pearl Harbor, where she was under overhaul until February 1943. The next few months, Smith performed anti-submarine patrols, did convoy duty, and participated in Navy exercises. In September and October, she was part of the amphibious landings at Lae and Finschhafen, New Guinea. In late December 1943 Smith was attached to Task Force 76, and took part in landing the 1st Marine Division at Cape Gloucester, New Britain.

In January 1944, Smith participated in the amphibious landing near Saidor, New Guinea, led by Barbey. In February, she bombarded designated targets in preparation for the landing at Los Negros in the Admiralty Islands. By the middle of March, Smith sailed to the west coast for overhaul. Completed in June, she returned to Pearl Harbor for training exercises and gunnery practice. Attached to the 7th Fleet in October, Smith sailed to Leyte Gulf in the Philippine Islands. There, she was positioned northeast of Ponson Island as a fighter director ship for the landing at Ormoc Bay in December 1944. During January 1945, Smith supported the landings in Lingayen Gulf, Philippine Islands. In late June, she bombarded Balikpapan, Borneo, in preparation for the landing by an Australian force. Smith departed the Philippines on 15 August 1945 for Buckner Bay, remaining there until steaming to Nagasaki Harbor, Kyushu, Japan, on 15 September, arriving there just 37 days after the nuclear bombing of Nagasaki on 9 August 1945 by US forces. There the ship boarded 80 US military ex-prisoners of war, taking them to Okinawa for transfer to the United States. On 21 September Smith returned to Nagasaki and picked up 90 Allied prisoners of war, taking them to Bickner Bay. She arrived in Sasebo, Nagasaki, on 28 September and departed two days later for San Diego via Pearl Harbor. Docking at San Diego on 19 November, she remained there until ordered to Pearl Harbor on 28 December, arriving there on 3 January 1946 and assumed an inactive status. The ship was decommissioned on 28 June 1946 and struck from the Navy list on 25 February 1947. Smith received six battle stars for her World War II service.

=== Preston ===
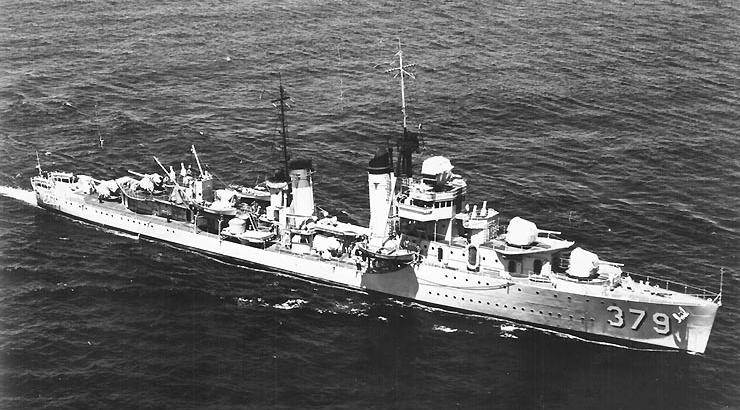
Preston underway in the 1930s

USS Preston was in service from October 1936 until November 1942. Following shakedown, she served briefly under the Chief of Naval Operations, then joined the US Fleet. Preston did peacetime training exercises into the month of December 1941, and performed patrol and escort duties along the west coast until June 1942. After that, she screened the carrier Saratoga to Hawaii, followed by four months of patrol and escort work in Hawaiian waters.

In October she became part of Task Force 61 and participated in the Battle of Santa Cruz. In mid-November 1942, Preston sailed to the western end of Guadalcanal to intercept another run by the Japanese to bombard Henderson Field. In the ensuing skirmish, Preston was hit by a salvo from a Japanese cruiser that put both fire rooms out of commission and toppled the aft stack. Her fires made an easy target; as they spread, the order was given to abandon ship. The ship rolled onto her side and sank, taking 116 of her crew with her. Preston received two battle stars for her World War II service.

=== Dunlap ===
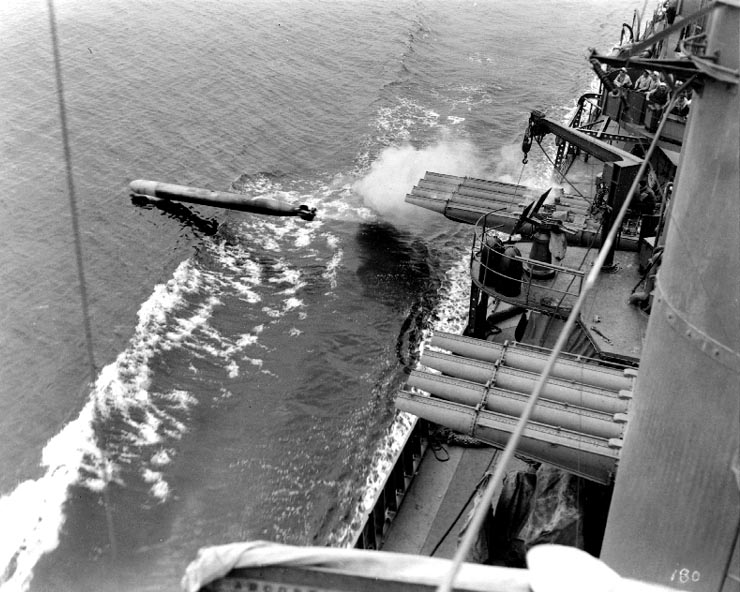
Dunlap firing a torpedo from starboard waist torpedo tubes, July 1942

USS Dunlap became part of the US Navy in June 1937. A year later, she served as an escort at Philadelphia for the steamer SS Kungsholm, which carried Gustaf Adolf, the Crown Prince of Sweden. By April 1940, Pearl Harbor was Dunlap's homeport. When the Japanese attacked, Dunlap was at sea bound for Pearl Harbor; she entered port the following day. In January, she sortied for air strikes on the Marshall Islands, and in February she took part in a raid on Wake Island. Afterward, Dunlap patrolled Hawaiian waters, escorted convoys between various ports on the west coast, and returned to Pearl Harbor in October 1942. In December, the destroyer moved on to Noumea, New Caledonia, and operated from there until July 1943. Dunlap saw action at Vella Gulf in the Solomon Islands in a nighttime torpedo clash. In United States Destroyer Operations in World War II (1953), Theodore Roscoe wrote: "In the Battle of Vella Gulf, as this engagement was called, the enemy had not laid a hand on the American ships."

After overhaul in San Diego, Dunlap performed patrol duty out of Adak, Alaska, in November and December 1943 and sailed to Pearl Harbor. From January until March 1944, she screened carriers in strikes on the Marshall Islands with the 5th Fleet. After that, Dunlap took part in strikes on the Soerabaja area of Java in May and returned to Pearl Harbor in June. In July, she sailed to San Francisco to join the screen for the heavy cruiser Baltimore, which carried Roosevelt for conferences and inspections with top Pacific commanders of Pearl Harbor and Alaskan bases. In early September 1944, Dunlap participated in the shelling of Wake Island. In October 1944, she lent a hand in the bombardment of Marcus Island. By January 1945, the ship was involved in the shelling of Iwo Jima, Haha-jima, and Chichi-jima. On 3 September 1945, Commodore John H. Magruder accepted the surrender of the Bonin Islands by Lt. General Yoshio Tachibana on board the destroyer. Dunlap sailed to Norfolk, Virginia, in November 1945, where she was decommissioned in December 1945 and sold in December 1947. She received six battle stars for her World War II service.

=== Fanning ===
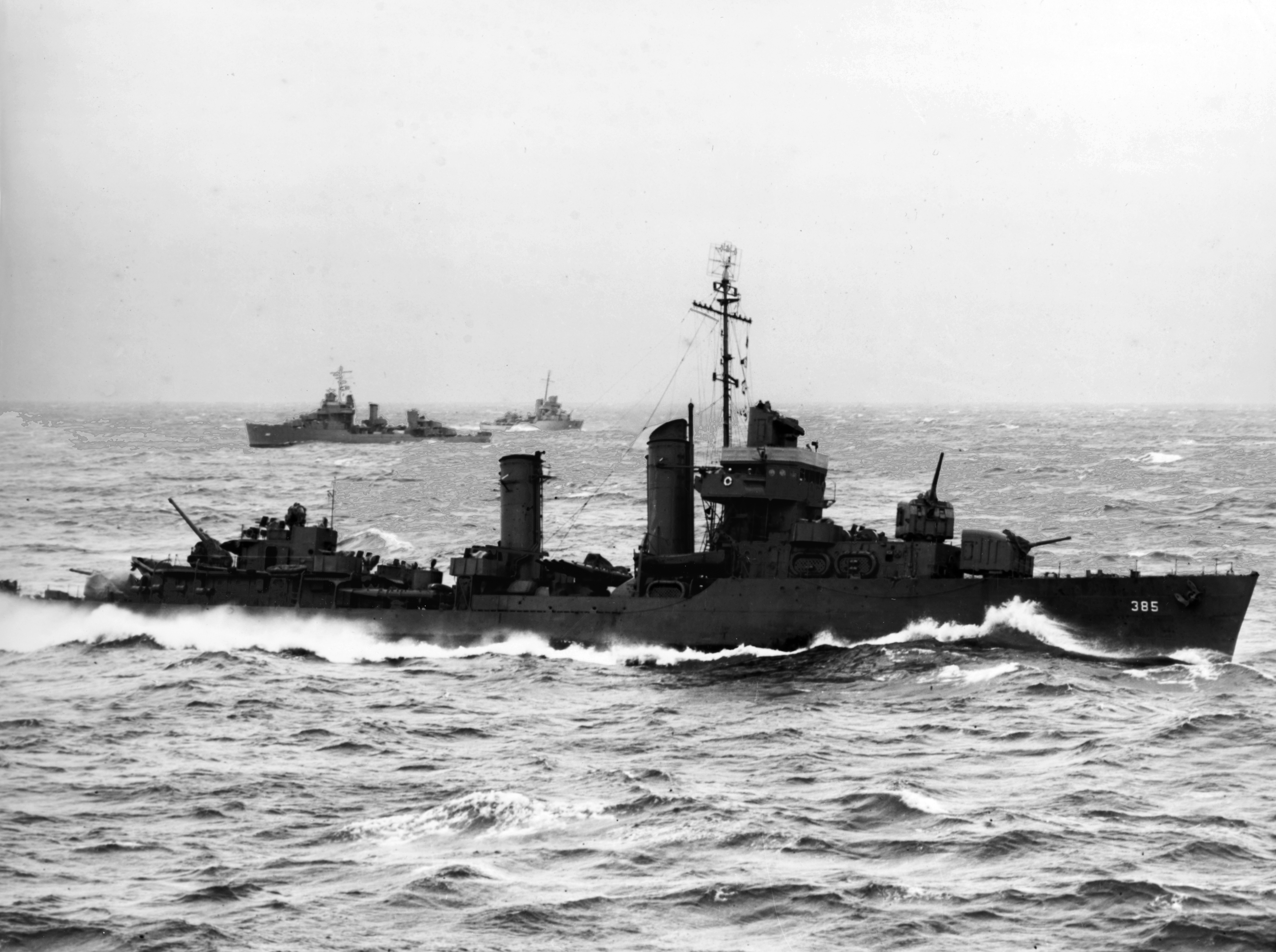
Fanning at sea on 18 April 1942, supporting the Doolittle Raid on Tokyo

USS Fanning was occupied with sea trials and minor repairs for the first six months of her naval service. In April 1938, she escorted the light cruiser Philadelphia from Annapolis, Maryland, to the Caribbean with Roosevelt aboard. Fanning sailed to New York for overhaul the following month; in September she moved on to her new base in San Diego, California. Over the next three years, her duties took her to the east coast and eventually to Hawaii. The ship was at sea when the Japanese struck Pearl Harbor; she returned the following day. Underway for Tutuila in January 1942, Fanning encountered a blinding rainstorm and collided with Gridley. Both destroyers suffered bow damage and were forced to return to Pearl Harbor. In April 1942 Fanning became part of Task Force 16, which supported the Doolittle Raid on the air strike against Tokyo. After the mission, she returned to Pearl Harbor.

For the first nine months of 1943, Fanning deployed against the Japanese on Guadalcanal, supported an occupation force on the Russell Islands, participated in patrol duty, and assisted in the protection of troops occupying Munda, Solomon Islands. In September, she had an overhaul on the west coast, then finished the year operating off the Aleutian Islands. By January 1944, Fanning was operating with Task Group 58.4 in the Marshall Islands. In March she reported to the Eastern Fleet (British units, reinforced with Australian, Dutch and French warships), participating in strikes against Sabang, Indonesia, the next month. Detached from the Eastern Fleet in May, Fanning sailed to the west coast. In July she left San Diego, escorting the heavy cruiser Baltimore to Alaska with Roosevelt on board. Her next assignment was with Task Group 30.2, shelling Marcus Island in October 1944 to create a diversion and destroy enemy installations. During January 1945, Fanning took part in the shelling of Iwo Jima, Haha-jima, and Chichi-Jima. For the remainder of the war, she was occupied with patrol and escort activities. In September 1945, she sailed for the United States, and was decommissioned at Norfolk, Virginia, in December 1945; she was sold for scrap in 1948. Fanning received four battle stars for her World War II service.

== See also ==
- List of United States Navy losses in World War II
- Marcílio Dias-class destroyer

== Bibliography ==
- Bauer, K. Jack; Roberts, Stephen S. (1991). Register of Ships of the U.S. Navy, 1775–1990: Major Combatants. Westport, Connecticut: Greenwood Press. ISBN 0-313-26202-0.
- Friedman, Norman (2004). U.S. Destroyers. Annapolis, MD: Naval Institute Press. ISBN 978-1-55750-442-5.
- Gardiner, Robert; Chesneau, Roger (1980). Conway's All the World's Fighting Ships 1922–1946. London: Conway Maritime Press. ISBN 0-83170-303-2.
- Hodges, Peter; Friedman, Norman, eds. (1979). Destroyer Weapons of World War 2. Annapolis, MD: Naval Institute Press. ISBN 0-87021-929-4.
- McComb, Dave (2010). US Destroyers 1934–1945. Long Island City, New York: Osprey Publishing. ISBN 978-1-84603-443-5.
- Reilly, John (1983). United States Navy Destroyers of World War II. Poole, Dorset, England: Blandford Press. ISBN 0-7137-1026-8.
- Rohwer, Jürgen (2005). Chronology of the War at Sea, 1939–1945: The Naval History of World War Two. Annapolis, MD: Naval Institute Press. ISBN 1-59114-119-2.
- Rohwer, Jürgen; Hümmelchen, Gerhard (1992). Chronology of the War at Sea 1939–1945. Annapolis, MD: Naval Institute Press. ISBN 1-55750-105-X.
- Roscoe, Theodore (1953). United States Destroyer Operations in World War II. Annapolis, MD: Naval Institute Press. ISBN 0-87021-726-7.
- Silverstone, Paul H. (1965). U.S. Warships of World War II. London: Ian Allan Ltd.
