= Mark 15 torpedo =

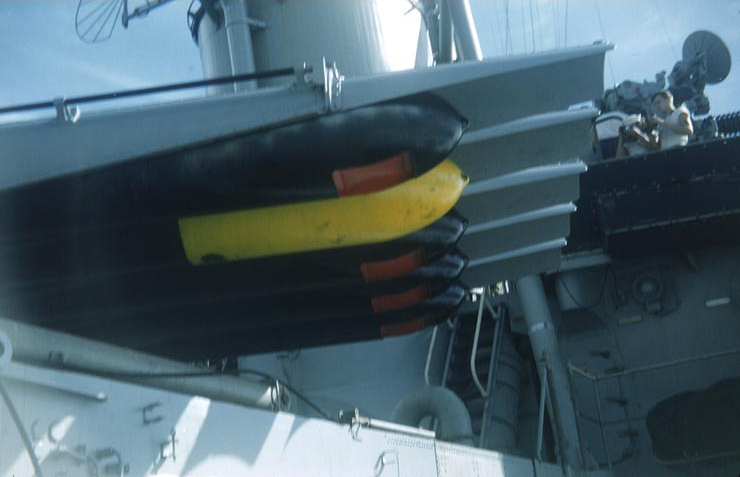
- Mk 15 torpedoes aboard USS O'Brien (DD-725)
- Type: Anti-surface ship torpedo
- Place of origin: United States

Service history
- In service: 1938-1956
- Used by: United States Navy
- Wars: World War II

Production history
- Designer: Naval Torpedo Station
- Designed: 1938
- Manufacturer: Naval Torpedo Station; Naval Ordnance Station Forest Park
- Produced: 1940-1944
- No. built: 9,700

Specifications
- Mass: Mod 0: 3,438 lbs. (1,559 kg) Mod 3: 3,841 lbs. (1,742 kg)
- Length: 288 inches
- Diameter: 21 inches (53 cm)
- Effective firing range: Mod.0 6,000 yards at 45 knots (5,500 meters at 83 km/h) Mod.3 4,500 yards at 45 knots (4,100 meters at 83 km/h)
- Maximum firing range: Mod.0: 15,000 yards at 26.5 knots (13,700 meters at 49 km/h) Mod.3: 14,000 yards at 26.5 knots (12,800 meters at 49 km/h)
- Warhead: Mod.0 TNT Mod.3 HBX
- Warhead weight: Mod 0: 494 lbs. (224 kg) TNT Mod 3: 801 lbs. (363 kg) TNT or 823 lbs. (373 kg) HBX
- Detonation mechanism: Mk 6 Mod 13 contact exploder
- Engine: Wet-heater combustion / steam turbine with compressed air tank
- Propellant: Methanol
- Maximum speed: 26.5 knots(slow) 33.5 knots(medium) 45 knots(fast)
- Guidance system: Gyroscope
- Launch platform: Destroyers

The Mark 15 torpedo was the standard American destroyer-launched torpedo of World War II. It was very similar in design to the Mark 14 torpedo except that it was longer, heavier, and had greater range and a larger warhead. The Mark 15 was developed by the Naval Torpedo Station Newport concurrently with the Mark 14 and was first deployed in 1938. It served as a replacement for the Mark 8 torpedo, Mark 11 Torpedo and Mark 12 Torpedo on surface ships with tubes that could accommodate the longer Mark 15; this primarily included destroyers built after 1930. Older destroyers, primarily the Wickes and Clemson classes, continued to use the Mark 8, as did PT boats early in World War II. During the war 9,700 were produced at Newport and at the Naval Ordnance Station Forest Park, Illinois.

The Mark 15 had the same basic design problems that plagued the Mark 14 for the first 20 months following U.S. entry into the war, though this was not realized nearly as quickly by the destroyer crews as it was by the submariners. One major shared deficiency was the Mark 6 exploder, which usually caused duds. Another was a tendency to run deeper than set, often missing the target. Surface-combatant torpedo attacks very often included confusing splashes from gunnery and aerial bombs, obscuring smoke screens, and quick maneuvering to evade counterattack. Rarely was a destroyer given a chance for a slow, careful surprise attack. Torpedo results were difficult to estimate under these circumstances. The correction of the Mark 15's problems would depend on the submariners solving theirs. Another problem with early war-built Mark 15s was the substitution of zinc for cadmium as interior plating for air flask sections and water compartments, due to a wartime shortage of cadmium. This resulted in zinc oxide clogging water strainers, leading to erratic runs and engine failures. After the failure of corrosion inhibition efforts, the ultimate solution was to re-coat the areas with cadmium or phenolic resin (Heresite). The final straw for Admiral Chester W. Nimitz (CINCPOA) to begin to resolve this problem that other admirals and torpedo manufacturers kept claiming was not a design problem but due to the performance of the submariners and surface ships' crew was when a submarine fleet successfully infiltrated Tokyo Harbor on 11 June 1943 but not a single torpedo that was launched by them hit any Japanese ships. The issues with the Mark 14 and Mark 15 torpedoes were not completely fixed until November 1943 when Vice Admiral Thomas C. Kinkaid (Seventh Fleet, SWPA) overruled Rear Admiral Ralph Waldo Christie, who refused to believe that his torpedoes had malfunctions, and ordered all submarine and destroyer captains to disable their faulty magnetic detonators and also the contact pin problem was finally resolved that same month.

The Battle of Vella Gulf on the night of 6–7 August 1943, was the first in which a surprise torpedo attack by U.S. gave the Americans an overwhelming advantage in the following gun battle, though one Japanese warship was hit by a dud torpedo and escaped. By September 1943, effective methods of torpedo deployment were beginning to be distributed to all U.S. destroyers.

== Tactics ==
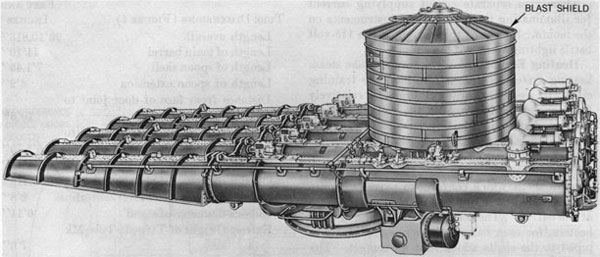
Above-water Mark 15 torpedo tube installation mounted on destroyers

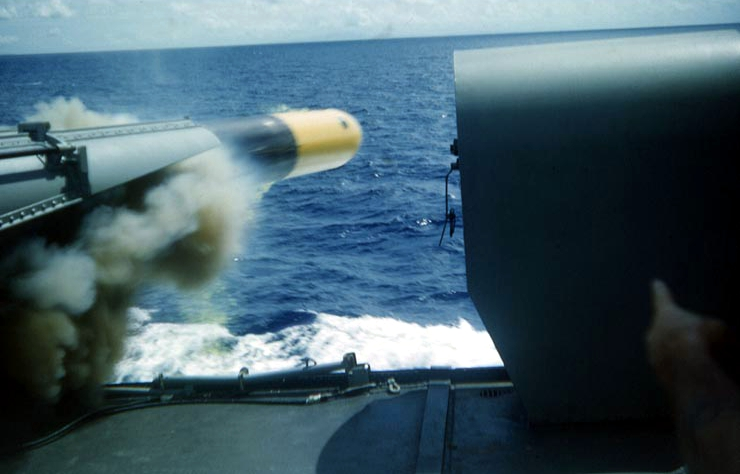
USS O'Brien (DD-725) firing a Mark 15 torpedo, circa 1953.

Anticipating the possibility of war with Japan, the United States planned to move their battleships across the Pacific with the fleet train. Cruisers and destroyers would be responsible for defending this large formation at night. Fleet exercises held during the 1930s revealed the confusing nature of close range engagements during hours of darkness. In 1932, during Fleet Problem XIII, "attacking" destroyers closed to within 500 yd (460 m) of USS Saratoga before being detected. Fleet Problem XV in 1934 placed the destroyer screen 7 nmi (13 km; 8 mi) beyond the battleship formation, but the battleships were unable to differentiate "friend" from "foe" at that distance. Screening destroyers were subsequently stationed at effective searchlight illumination range, 3 nmi (5.6 km; 3.5 mi). Recognition improved at that distance, but torpedo hit probability increased as evasive maneuvering of the large, compact force was restricted within the closer screen.

United States Navy War Instructions (FTP 143) published in 1934 remained in effect through the initial 1942 engagements in the Solomon Islands. The instructions emphasized defense to avoid the attrition objective of Japanese planning:

- Cruisers were advised to avoid night action unless conditions were favorable.
- Destroyers were to attack at once with guns, but reserve torpedoes for use against capital ships.

Searchlight illumination range effectively covered launch positions of United States torpedoes, but not the Japanese Type 93 torpedo. Japanese ships could remain outside of illumination range, launching torpedoes at American ships that revealed their positions with gunfire and use of searchlights.

== See also ==
- American 21 inch torpedo
