= USS Downes (DD-375) =

Mahan-class destroyer

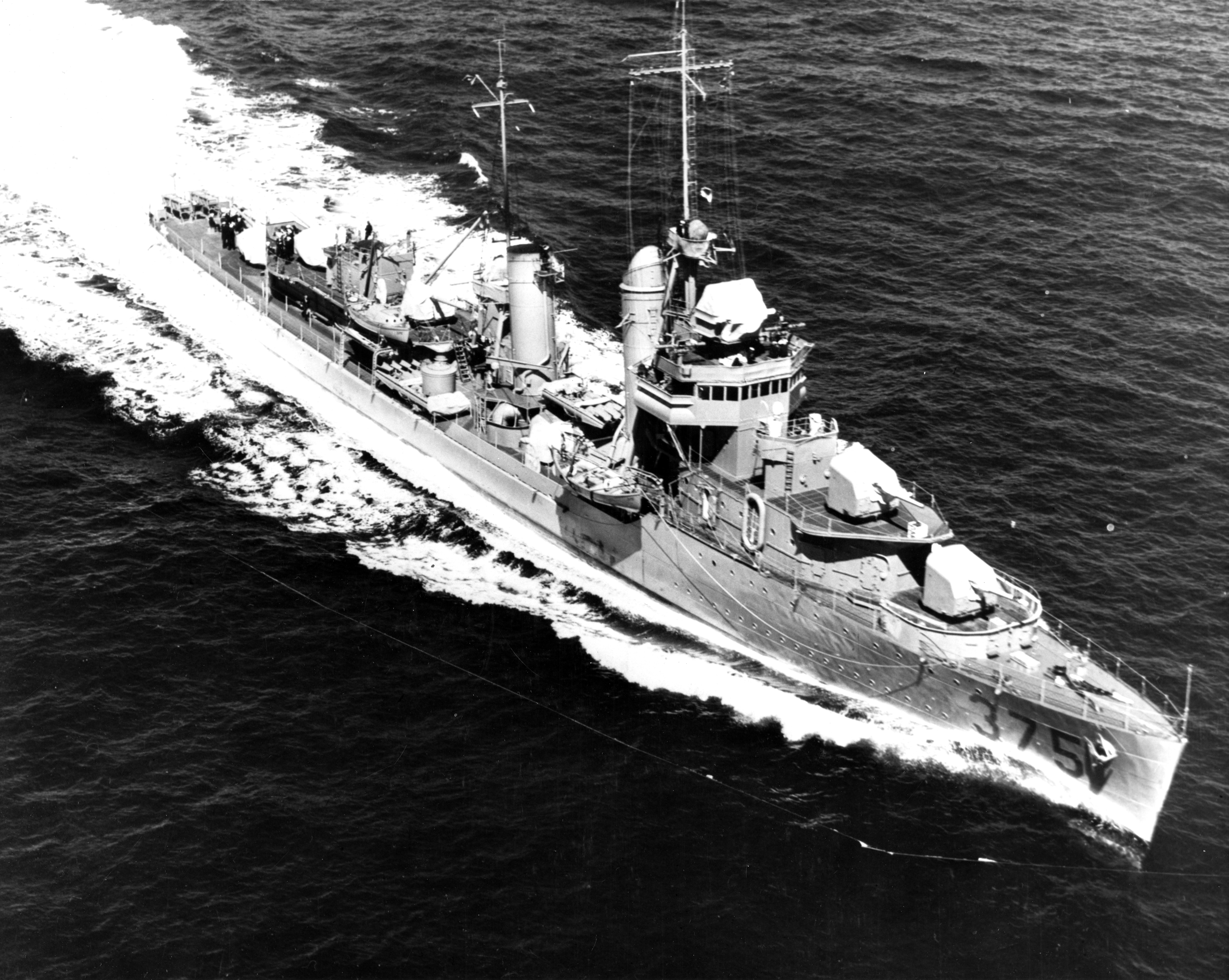
- The USS Downes while underway during the later 1930s

History

United States
- Builder: Norfolk Naval Shipyard
- Rebuilder: Mare Island Naval Shipyard
- Laid down: 15 August 1934
- Launched: 22 April 1936
- Commissioned: 15 January 1937
- Decommissioned: 20 June 1942
- Recommissioned: 15 November 1943
- Decommissioned: 17 December 1945
- Fate: Sold for scrap 18 November 1947

General characteristics
- Class & type: Mahan-class destroyer
- Displacement: 1,500 tons
- Length: 341 ft 4 in (104.04 m)
- Beam: 35 ft (11 m)
- Draft: 9 ft 10 in (3.00 m)
- Speed: 37 knots (69 km/h)
- Complement: 158 officers and crew
- Armament: As Built: 1 × Gun Director above bridge; 5 × 5"(127mm)/38cal DP (5x1), 12 × 21 inch (533 mm) T Tubes (3x4), 4 × .50cal (12.7mm) MG AA (4x1), 2 × Depth Charge stern racks, c1944: 1 × Mk37 Gun Fire Control System, 4 × 5" (127mm)/38cal DP (4x1), 12 × 21 inch (533 mm) T Tubes (3x4), 2 × Mk51 Gun Directors, 4 × Bofors 40 mm AA (2x2), 6 × Oerlikon 20 mm AA (6x1), 2 × Depth Charge roll-off stern racks, 4 × K-gun depth charge projectors

USS Downes (DD-375) was a Mahan-class destroyer in the United States Navy before and during World War II. She was the second ship named for John Downes, a US Navy officer.

== Pre-war service ==
Downes was launched 22 April 1936 by Norfolk Naval Shipyard; sponsored by Miss S. F. Downes, descendant of Captain Downes; and commissioned 15 January 1937.

Downes reached San Diego, California from Norfolk, Virginia 24 November 1937, and based there for exercises along the west coast, in the Caribbean, and in the Hawaiian Islands until April 1940, when Pearl Harbor became her home port. In March and April 1941 she joined in a cruise to Samoa, Fiji, and Australia, and visited the west coast later in the year.

== World War II service ==
=== Attack damage ===
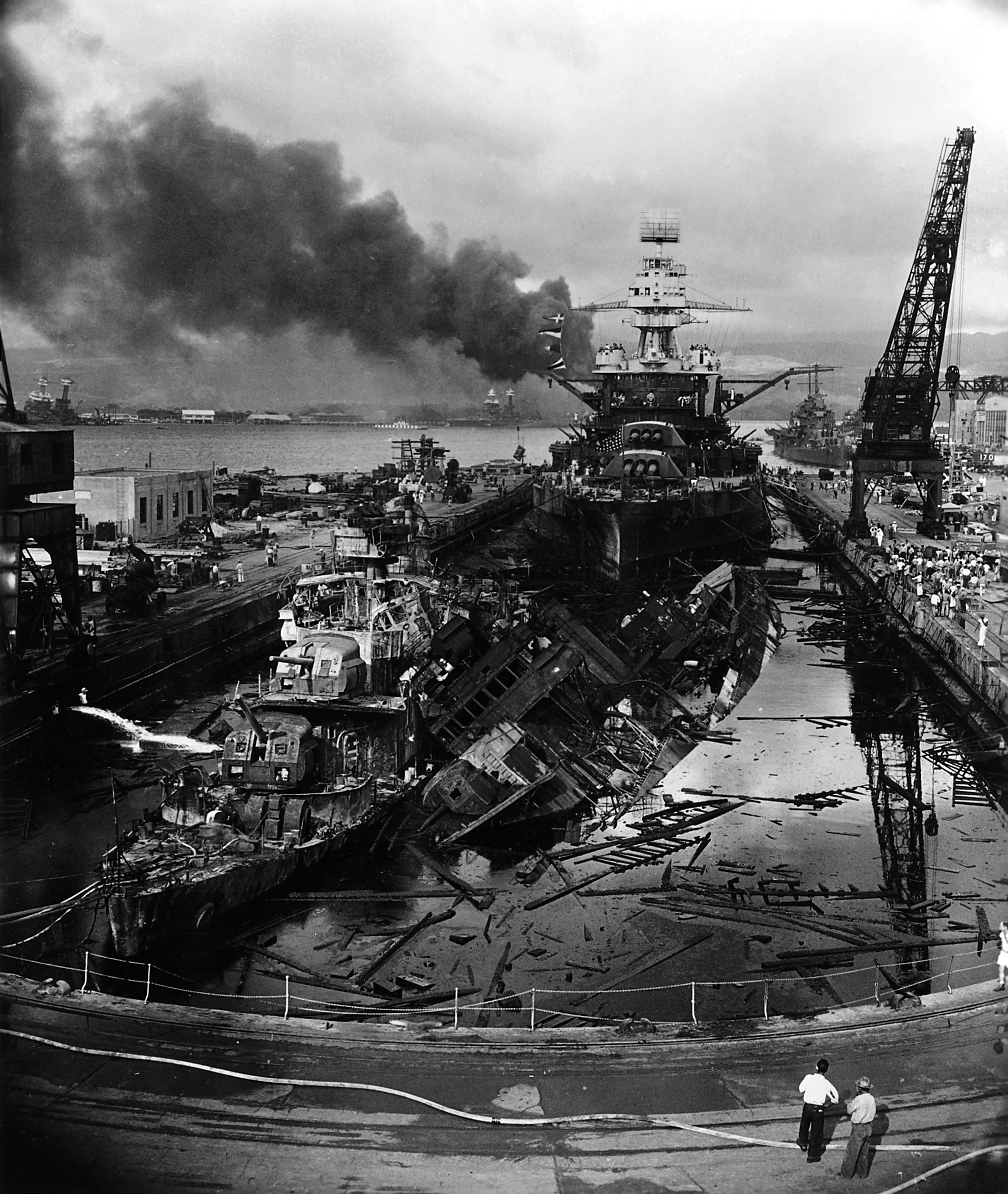
Cassin lists and rests on a damaged Downes in the aftermath of the attack on Pearl Harbor, along with the damaged Pennsylvania

When the Japanese attacked Pearl Harbor 7 December 1941, Downes was in drydock with Cassin and Pennsylvania. The three came under heavy attack and a 250 Kg. bomb landed between the two destroyers, starting raging fires fed by oil from a ruptured fuel tank. Despite heavy strafing, the crews of the two destroyers got their batteries into action, driving off further attacks by Japanese planes. The drydock was flooded in an effort to quench the fires, but the burning oil rose with the water level and when the ammunition and torpedo warheads on board the destroyers began to explode, the two ships were abandoned. Later Cassin slipped from her keel blocks and rested against Downes. Both ship's hulls were damaged beyond repair but machinery and equipment were salvaged and sent to Mare Island Navy Yard where entirely new ships were built around the salvaged material and given the wrecked ship's names and hull numbers. Downes was officially decommissioned 20 June 1942.

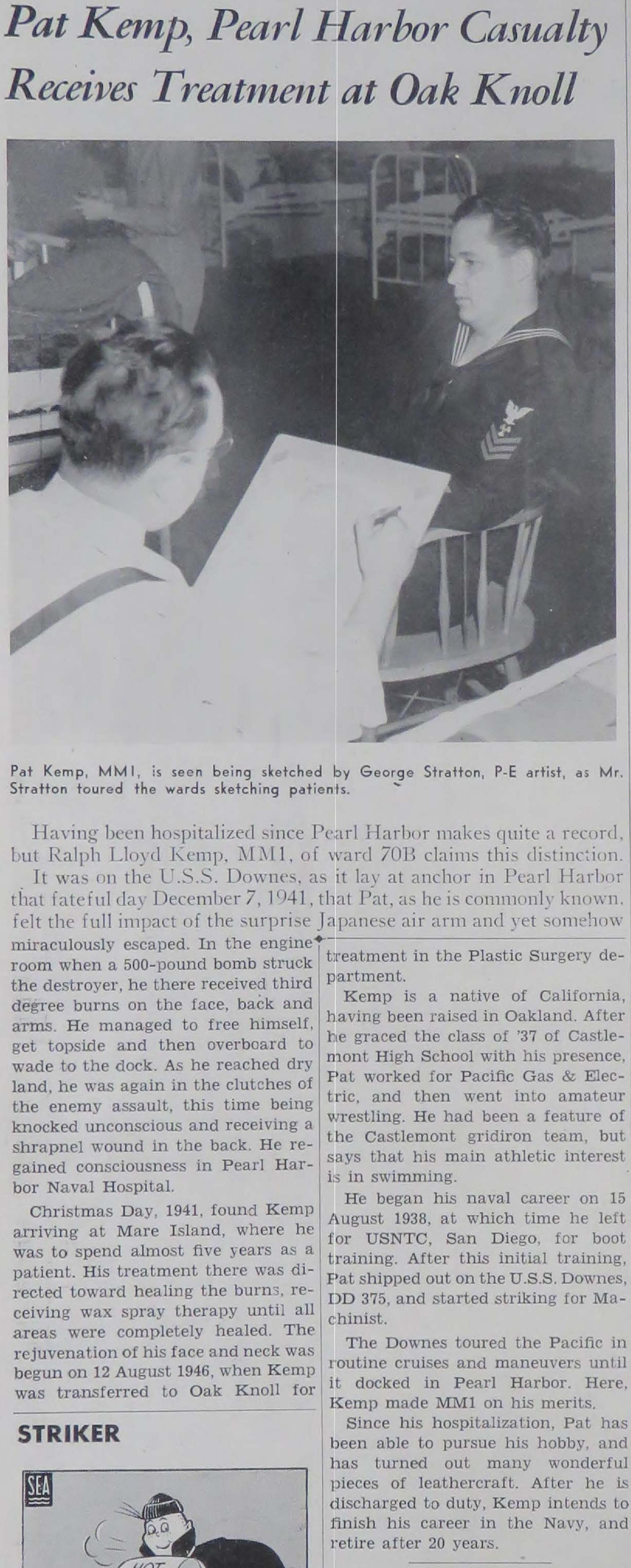
USS Downes survivor article: "Pat Kemp, Pearl Harbor Casualty Receives Treatment at Oak Knoll" on page 4 of issue "8 February 1947" of The Oak Leaf

=== Return to service ===
Recommissioned at Mare Island on 15 November 1943, Downes sailed from San Francisco, California 8 March 1944 to escort convoys to Pearl Harbor and on to Majuro, arriving 26 March. She was assigned to blockade the bypassed Japanese stronghold, Wotje Atoll, until 5 April, then after replenishing at Pearl Harbor, arrived at Eniwetok 6 May for service as harbor entrance control vessel and task unit commander for the offshore patrol. During this duty she rescued a pilot in the lagoon at Eniwetok and four crewmen off Ponape, Caroline Islands. In July Downes began convoy duty from Eniwetok to Saipan in support of the Marianas Islands operation, then patrolled off Tinian during its invasion. She gave fire support at Marpi Point, Tinian, and bombarded Aguijan Island. On 9 October she took part in the bombardment of Marcus Island as a diversion for carrier air strikes on the Nansei Shoto.

Downes sailed from Saipan 14 October to join TG 38.1 2 days later in a search for Japanese ships which Admiral William F. Halsey hoped to lure into the open with damaged cruisers Canberra and Houston. The task group returned to Leyte to support the landings there 20 October. Downes sailed the same day for Ulithi but was recalled to screen the carriers during the air strikes on the Japanese Fleet in the Battle of Leyte Gulf. She was detached again 27 October and sailed to Ulithi for replenishment.

Continuing to Pearl Harbor for overhaul, Downes returned to Ulithi 29 March 1945 escorting a convoy, then sailed for Guam. From 5 April to 5 June she operated in the Marianas on patrol, air-sea rescue, submarine training, and escort duty. She served at Iwo Jima on similar duty from 9 June. With the end of the war, Downes was ordered to return to the United States and sailed from Iwo Jima 19 September with homeward-bound servicemen on board. She touched at San Pedro, California, called at Beaumont, Texas, for Navy Day celebrations and arrived at Norfolk 5 November.

Downes was decommissioned 17 December 1945, and sold for scrap 18 November 1947.

== Recognition ==
Downes received four battle stars for World War II service.
