= USS Fanning (FF-1076) =

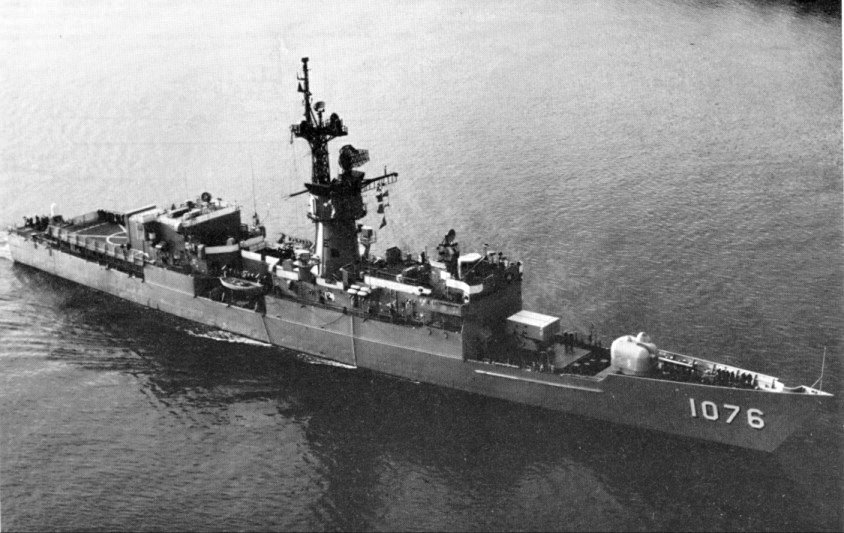
- USS Fanning (FF-1076)

History

United States
- Name: Fanning
- Namesake: Nathaniel Fanning
- Ordered: 22 July 1964
- Builder: Todd Shipyards, Los Angeles Division, San Pedro, CA
- Laid down: 7 December 1968
- Launched: 24 January 1970
- Acquired: 16 July 1971
- Commissioned: 23 July 1971
- Decommissioned: 31 July 1993
- Stricken: 11 January 1995
- Motto: Indomitable
- Fate: Transferred To Turkey 31 July 1993

Turkey
- Name: Adatepe
- Acquired: 31 July 1993
- Decommissioned: 2001
- Identification: F-251

General characteristics
- Class & type: Knox-class frigate
- Displacement: 3,202 tons (4,183 full load)
- Length: 438 ft (133.5 m)
- Beam: 46 ft 9 in (14.2 m)
- Draft: 24 ft 9 in (7.5 m)
- Propulsion: 2 × CE 1,200 psi (8,300 kPa) boilers; 1 Westinghouse geared turbine; 1 shaft, 35,000 shp (26,000 kW)
- Speed: over 27 knots (31 mph; 50 km/h)
- Range: 4,500 nautical miles (8,330 km)
- Complement: 18 officers, 267 enlisted
- Sensors & processing systems: AN/SPS-40 Air Search Radar; AN/SPS-67 Surface Search Radar; AN/SQS-26 Sonar; AN/SQS-35 IVDS Independent Variable Depth Sonar; AN/SQR-18 Towed array sonar system; Mk68 Gun Fire Control System
- Electronic warfare & decoys: AN/SLQ-32 Electronicstalk Warfare System
- Armament: one Mk-16 8 cell missile launcher for RUR-5 ASROC and Harpoon missiles; one Mk-42 5-inch/54 caliber gun; Mark 46 torpedoes from four single tube launchers); one Mk-25 BPDMS launcher for Sea Sparrow missiles, later replaced by Phalanx CIWS
- Aircraft carried: one SH-2 Seasprite (LAMPS I) helicopter

USS Fanning (FF-1076), a Knox-class frigate, is the third ship of the United States Navy to be named for Nathaniel Fanning.

== Design and description ==
The Knox-class design was derived from the Brooke-class frigate modified to extend range and without a long-range missile system. The ships had an overall length of 438 feet (133.5 m), a beam of 47 feet (14.3 m) and a draft of 25 feet (7.6 m). They displaced 4,066 long tons (4,131 t) at full load. Their crew consisted of 13 officers and 211 enlisted men.

The ships were equipped with one Westinghouse geared steam turbine that drove the single propeller shaft. The turbine was designed to produce 35,000 shaft horsepower (26,000 kW), using steam provided by 2 C-E boilers, to reach the designed speed of 27 knots (50 km/h; 31 mph). The Knox class had a range of 4,500 nautical miles (8,300 km; 5,200 mi) at a speed of 20 knots (37 km/h; 23 mph).

The Knox-class ships were armed with a 5"/54 caliber Mark 42 gun forward and a single 3-inch/50-caliber gun aft. They mounted an eight-round ASROC launcher between the 5-inch (127 mm) gun and the bridge. Close-range anti-submarine defense was provided by two twin 12.75-inch (324 mm) Mk 32 torpedo tubes. The ships were equipped with a torpedo-carrying DASH drone helicopter; its telescoping hangar and landing pad were positioned amidships aft of the mack. Beginning in the 1970s, the DASH was replaced by a SH-2 Seasprite LAMPS I helicopter and the hangar and landing deck were accordingly enlarged. Most ships also had the 3-inch (76 mm) gun replaced by an eight-cell BPDMS missile launcher in the early 1970s. None of the class was actually built mounting a 3-inch gun.

== Construction and career ==
Constructed by Todd Shipyards, Los Angeles Division, San Pedro, CA, laid down 7 December 1968, launched 24 January 1970, and delivered 16 July 1971. She was commissioned 23 July 1971, decommissioned 31 July 1993 and was struck 11 January 1995. She was transferred to Turkey on her decommissioning and renamed Adatepe (F-251). Decommissioned by Turkey in 2001.
