= USS Fanning (DD-385) =

Mahan-class destroyer

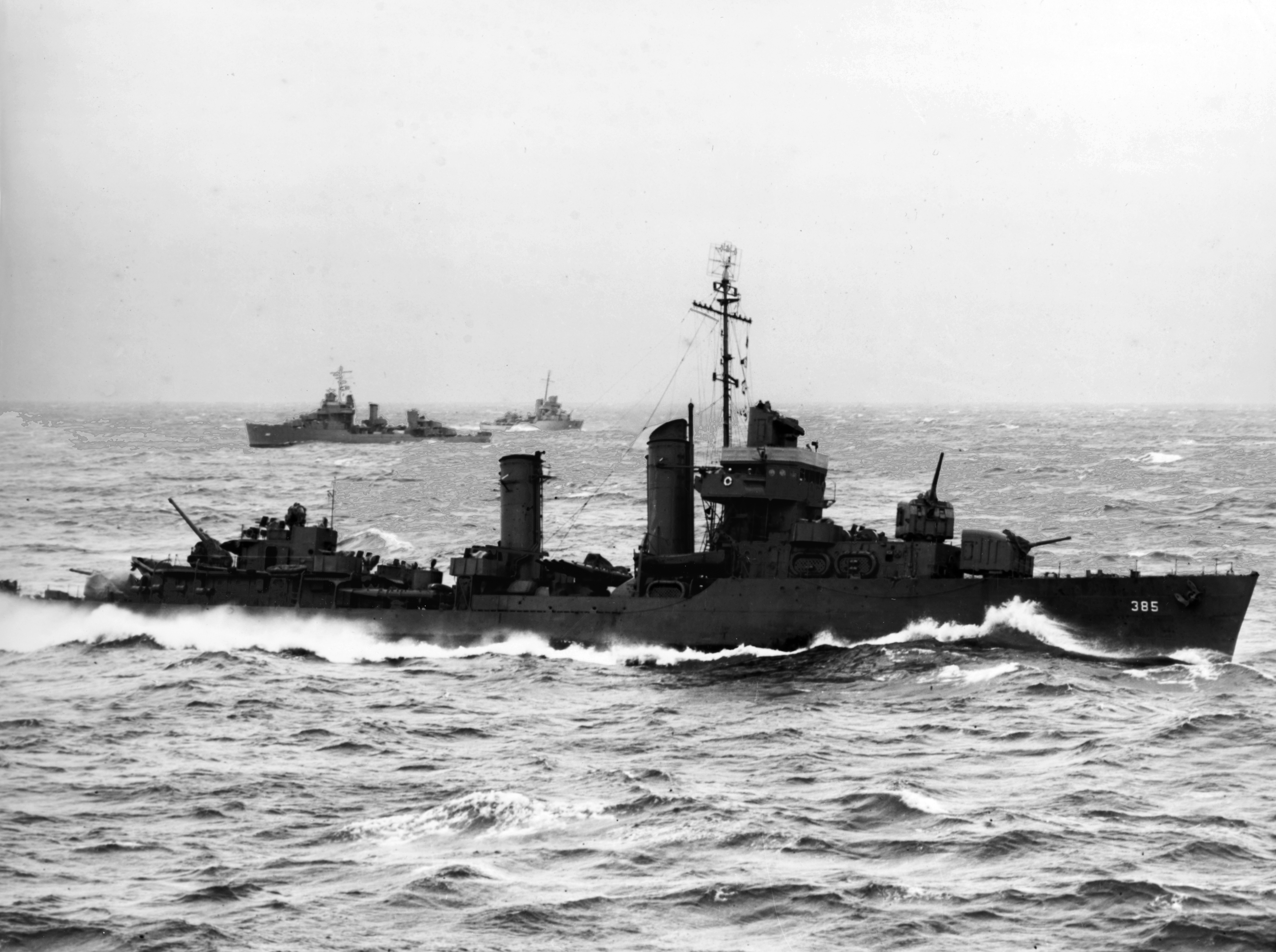
- USS Fanning (DD-385)

History

United States
- Namesake: Nathaniel Fanning
- Builder: United Shipyards, Inc., Staten Island, New York City
- Laid down: 10 April 1935
- Launched: 18 September 1936
- Commissioned: 8 October 1937
- Decommissioned: 14 December 1945
- Stricken: 28 January 1947
- Fate: Sold 6 January 1948, broken up for scrap.

General characteristics
- Class & type: Mahan-class destroyer
- Displacement: 1,500 tons
- Length: 341 ft 4 in (104 m)
- Beam: 35 ft (10.7 m)
- Draft: 9 ft 10 in (2.8 m)
- Speed: 37 knots (69 km/h)
- Complement: 158 officers and crew
- Armament: 5 × 5 in (130 mm) guns, 12 × 21 inch (533 mm) torpedo tubes

USS Fanning (DD-385) was a Mahan-class destroyer, in the United States Navy named for Nathaniel Fanning. Her first action was during World War II, immediately following the 7 December 1941 attack on Pearl Harbor. Fanning continued to serve in the Pacific Theatre throughout the war, and was decommissioned 14 December 1945. He was one of the last Mahan-class destroyers. Fanning and USS Dunlap were built from the same basic Mahan design but slightly modified. Some sources refer to them as the Dunlap-class destroyers.

== History ==
Fanning was launched 18 September 1936 by United Shipyards, Inc., New York City; sponsored by Miss Cora A. Marsh, great-great-granddaughter of Lieutenant Fanning; and commissioned 8 October 1937.

Trials, fitting out, shakedown, and minor repairs occupied Fanning until 22 April 1938 when she joined Philadelphia (CL-41) at Annapolis, Maryland, to escort the cruiser as she carried Franklin D. Roosevelt, President of the United States on a Caribbean cruise. After returning to New York on 11 May, she underwent overhaul, escorted MS Kungsholm with Gustaf VI Adolf, the Crown Prince of Sweden, embarked, then sailed for the west coast to join the Battle Force in September. Based in San Diego, California, the destroyer conducted antiaircraft gunnery, antisubmarine, and tactical exercises. In the next 3 years, Fanning's schedule took her back to the Atlantic once and to Hawaii several times, all the while enhancing her battle readiness.

=== 1941 ===
The attack on Pearl Harbor on 7 December 1941 found Fanning at sea with TF 8 returning to Pearl Harbor from Wake Island where Enterprise (CV-6) had delivered the squadron of Marine Corps fighter planes which became Wake's only airborne defense. The force made a search, refueled at Pearl Harbor on 8 December, and the following day sortied to hunt submarines. They made several contacts. Aircraft from Enterprise sank Japanese submarine I-70 on 10 December in 23°45′N 155°35′W. Fanning sailed from Pearl Harbor with TF 8 on 19 December to relieve Wake Island, however, the island fell before help could arrive, and the reinforcements were delivered to Midway.

=== 1942 ===
In mid-January 1942 while underway for Tutuila, she encountered a blinding rainstorm during which she collided with Gridley (DD-380), badly damaging both ships. After emergency repairs at Pago Pago, she returned to Pearl Harbor where her bow was restored.

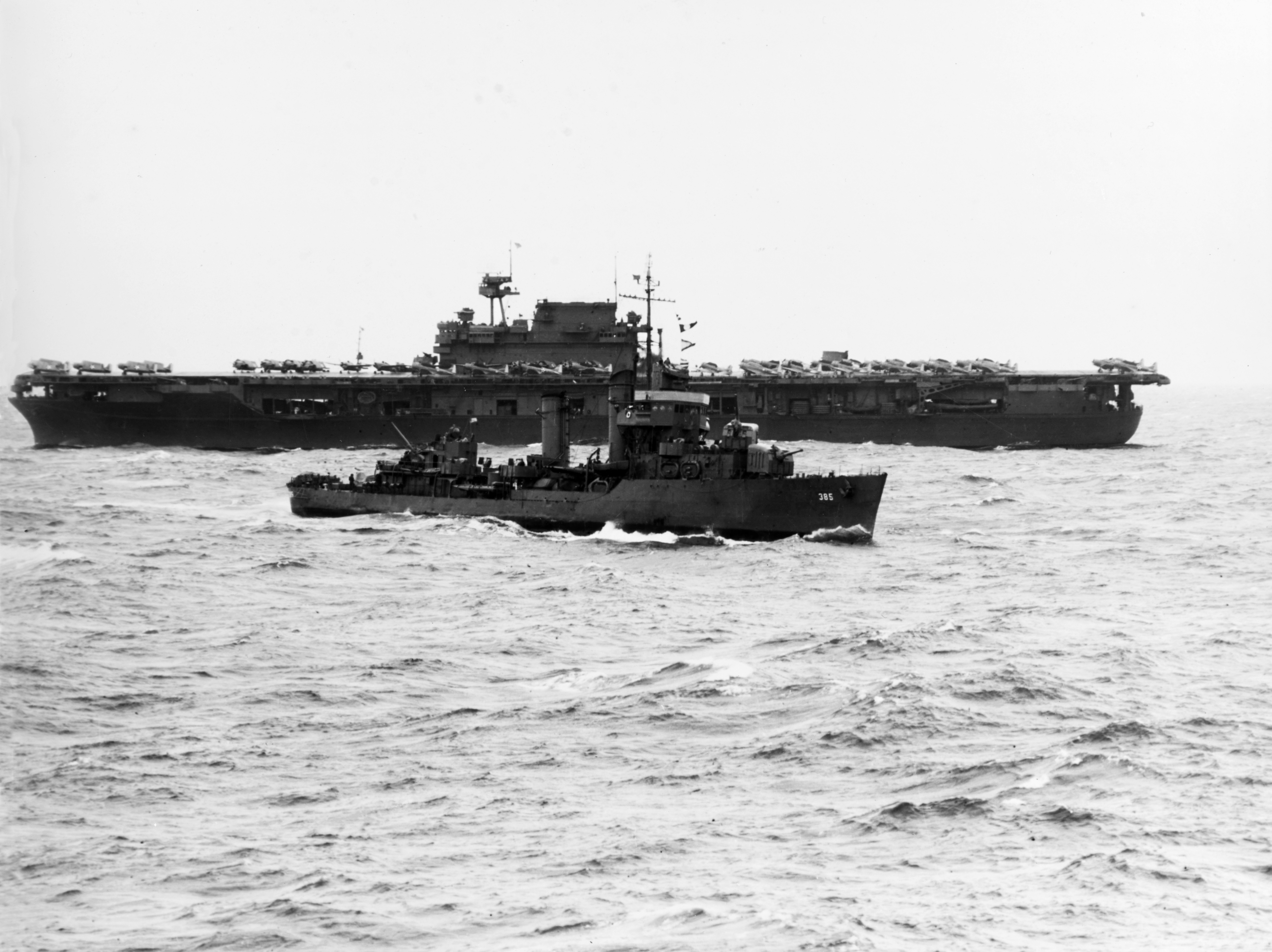
USS Fanning and USS Enterprise in May 1942

She was part of TF 16 which sailed on 8 April 1942 to rendezvous with TF 18. This combined force, commanded by Vice Admiral William F. Halsey, Jr., and carrying the Doolittle raiders, was charged with launching the first American offensive against the Japanese homeland. Returning safely to Pearl Harbor on 25 April after the successful mission, she escorted an Army tug to Canton Island and returned to San Francisco for needed repairs.

The destroyer made two voyages along the west coast and escorted three convoys to Pearl Harbor before 12 November when she joined TF 11 for duty in the Solomon Islands. The rest of the year was spent in convoy and patrol among the islands.

=== 1943 ===
In January 1943 she deployed with TF 11 against the Japanese on Guadalcanal. From 20 to 25 February she assisted TF 64 in supporting an occupation force on the Russell Islands, participated in exercises and patrol, and steamed with TG 36.3 to afford protection to troops occupying Munda Island.

In September she escorted a transport convoy from Noumea to Guadalcanal. Late in the month she got underway with Case (DD-370), McCall (DD-400), and Craven (DD-382) for San Francisco and a period of overhaul. She completed the year in patrol and in training and exercise operations off the Aleutian Islands.

=== 1944 ===
On 19 January 1944 Fanning sailed with TG-58.4 for operations in the Marshalls where planes from Saratoga (CV-3) struck at Wotje, Taroa, Utirik, and Rongelap with a 4-day uninterrupted bombardment of Eniwetok which precursed a later all-out attack. For the remainder of the month Fanning and other units of the escort group shuttled between Kwajalein and Eniwetok, making 25 strikes in 19 days, and providing support for the amphibious landings on the latter island.

In March 1944 Fanning, Saratoga, Dunlap (DD-384), and Cummings (DD-365) were ordered to report to the British Eastern Fleet, primarily British units reinforced with Australian, Dutch and French warships. The planned joint operations were intended to transfer operational expertise to the Fleet Air Arm aircrews, divert Japanese attention from American activities elsewhere and cripple Japanese mobility in the south east Asia region. HMS Illustrious and Saratoga launched air strikes against Sabang, Sumatra, (19 April) to destroy refineries, storage and transportation facilities. On 17 May this powerful force hit Soerabaja, Java, where harbor facilities and refineries presented the chief targets.

Detached from the Eastern Fleet late in May, Fanning set course for San Francisco with calls at Fremantle and Sydney, Australia, and Noumea in passage. On 17 July she stood out for San Diego with Baltimore (CA-68) and on the 21st escorted President Roosevelt, embarked in the cruiser, north to Adak and Kodiak, Alaska. On 7 August the President shifted to Cummings who got underway for Bremerton in company with Fanning and Dunlap.

The destroyer engaged in shore bombardment and other exercises until 17 September when she again steamed for the forward areas. After escorting SS Antigua to Eniwetok, she patrolled with TG 57.7 off Tinian and performed escort duty with TG 30.2 for a diversionary strike against Marcus Island on 9 October.

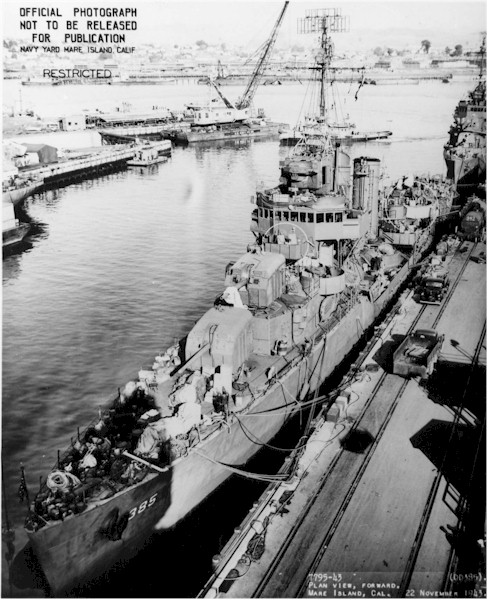
USS Fanning at Mare Island

Fanning sortied with TG 38.1 on 16 October to screen a carrier group which launched two strikes against Luzon before moving in to support the Leyte landings. 22 October found the group underway for refueling and replenishment at Ulithi but word of an advancing Japanese fleet caused them to reverse course and the destroyer sped to participate in the action at San Bernardino Strait.

After logistics were completed at Ulithi, Fanning moved to Saipan to rejoin TG 30.2 for a series of assaults on Iwo Jima, the first of these on 11–12 November. An assignment as radar picket occupied her until 4 December when she returned to bombard Iwo on the 8th. During the third attack (24 and 27 December) she set a patrol vessel on fire.

=== 1945 ===
In the strike on 5 January 1945 Fanning made contact with a small freighter who tried to ram her and raked her decks before taking a torpedo which sent her to the bottom.

Fanning rejoined the group for the bombardment of Chichi Jima, but was soon detached to escort David W. Taylor (DD-551) damaged by a mine, to Ulithi. She returned to the tenacious force once again off Iwo Jima on 24 January and teamed with Dunlap to sink a three ship convoy consisting of transport Yoneyama Maru; and auxiliary minesweepers Showa Maru No. 7 and Keinan Maru. She then assumed station as radar picket and air rescue ship, operating also in local escort duty and in training exercises with a submarine wolfpack through 22 March.

The remainder of the war was occupied with patrol and escort activities among the islands of Eniwetok, Iwo Jima, and Guam. On 19 September 1945 Fanning set course for the United States, arriving at Galveston, Texas, on 23 October 1945.

Fanning was decommissioned under the command of Commander Earnest "Bud" Conant at Norfolk, Virginia, on 14 December 1945 and later sold.

Fanning received four battle stars for World War II service.
