= Mark 11 torpedo =

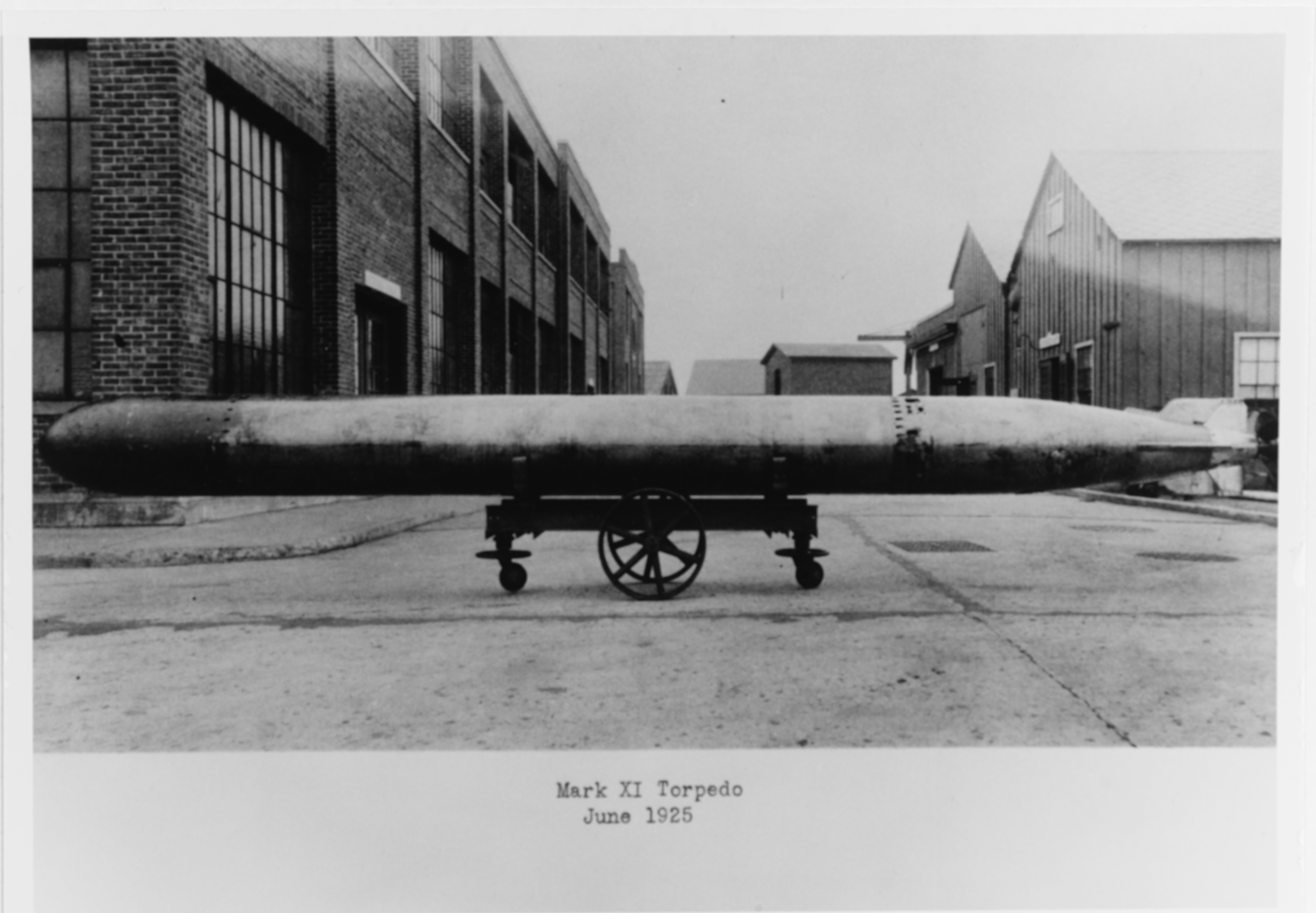
- The Mark 11 torpedo at Newport, Rhode Island, torpedo factory, June 1925.
- Type: Anti-surface ship torpedo
- Place of origin: United States

Service history
- In service: 1926–1945
- Used by: United States Navy
- Wars: World War II

Production history
- Designer: Washington Navy Yard; Naval Torpedo Station
- Designed: 1926
- Manufacturer: Naval Torpedo Station
- Variants: Mod 1

Specifications
- Mass: 3511 pounds
- Length: 271 inches
- Diameter: 21 inches
- Effective firing range: 6000–15,000 yards
- Warhead: Mk 11, TNT
- Warhead weight: 500 pounds
- Detonation mechanism: Mk 3, Mod 1 contact exploder
- Engine: Turbine
- Maximum speed: 27–46 knots
- Guidance system: Gyroscope
- Launch platform: Destroyers

The Mark 11 torpedo was the first American torpedo to be designed within the United States Navy without collaboration from industry. It was developed by the Washington Navy Yard in Washington, D.C., and the Naval Torpedo Station in Newport, Rhode Island. The Mark 11 torpedo was also the first to feature a three-speed setting capability while tube-loaded: high at 46 knots, medium at 34 knots and low at 27 knots. Due to stability problems it was supplemented by the Mark 12 torpedo within two years, which had a 44-knot high speed setting.

== See also ==
- American 21-inch torpedo
