= Nathaniel Fanning =

American naval officer (1755–1805)

Nathaniel Fanning (May 31, 1755 – September 30, 1805) was an officer in the Continental Navy and later the United States Navy, who served aboard Bonhomme Richard during its 1779 battle with HMS Serapis.

Fanning was born in Stonington, Connecticut, and was the eldest son of Gilbert Fanning and Huldah Palmer. His father was a merchant who supplied provisions to General George Washington's army during the American Revolution.

On May 26, 1778, Fanning embarked from Boston, Massachusetts, aboard the brig Angelica as a prizemaster under the command of Captain William Denison in a cruise against the British. On May 31, Angelica was captured by the British man-of-war Andromeda and blown up, with Fanning being made a prisoner. Aboard Andromeda was General William Howe, who was returning to England. By orders of General Howe, the Americans were confined to the hold and treated severely, being allowed but a half-pint of water per day per man, even though the heat was so unbearable that the men were obliged to strip off all their clothes.

On June 30, 1778, Andromeda reached Portsmouth, England, and Fanning was incarcerated at Forton prison. On July 2, 1779, Fanning was included in a prisoner exchange. He was marched to Gosport, then taken by cartel to Nantes, France. From there, he traveled to L'Orient, where, under the command of John Paul Jones, he agreed to serve as midshipman and private secretary aboard Bonhomme Richard

On August 14, 1779, Bonhomme Richard set sail, and over the next month captured or destroyed at least 29 enemy vessels. On September 23, Bonhomme Richard famously fought the British frigate Serapis. During this engagement, Fanning served as captain of the main top. Most of his original group of men were killed, but he took a fresh party aloft and with them cleared Serapis' tops. When their yards locked the ships together, he led his men across to the British ship, where with hand grenades and mortars, they drove the British seamen from their stations. In recommending that Fanning be promoted, Jones said of him ". . . he was one cause among the prominent in obtaining the victory". Bonhomme Richard was destroyed during this battle, but the Americans sailed to Holland aboard Serapis.

Fanning continued to serve under Jones aboard his new ship Alliance and later Ariel. Fanning then served as second-in-command aboard the privateer Count de Guichen. On March 23, 1781, they set sail from Morlaix and for many weeks ransomed or sunk numerous enemy vessels. But on May 4, the privateer was captured by Aurora and Fanning was again made prisoner, but paroled after six weeks.

On December 3, 1781, Fanning sailed from Ostend aboard Eclipse and had another productive cruise, returning to Dunkirk on March 6, 1782. While Eclipse was being refitted, Fanning made two trips to London, once as a spy and once to deliver peace proposals from the court of French King Louis XVI. On June 6, Eclipse left for the coast of Scotland under the command of Fanning. On August 11, Eclipse was chased by Jupiter, said to be the fastest ship in the Royal Navy. To escape Jupiter, Fanning ordered Eclipse to pass directly through the middle of the British Channel Fleet in broad daylight. To evade capture, he hoisted English colors and when hailed, answered that the ship was His Majesty's cutter Surprise.

Two days later, Fanning was wounded in the left leg by a musketball while capturing Lord Howe. He sailed for Dunkirk and spent several weeks recovering. In October 1782, he was commissioned as lieutenant in the French Navy. On October 23, he sailed from Dunkirk in command of the privateer Ranger, but it was captured by a British cutter. Fanning was promptly exchanged, but his crew members, being Irish, were all executed as traitors.

Returning to Dunkirk, Fanning set sail again on November 14, but was captured a fourth time by the British frigate Belle Poule. Fanning was placed in chains and abused by the crew. He was rescued when his captors' ship was, in turn, captured by the French Navy. Learning that a peace treaty was imminent, Fanning attempted to launch yet another expedition against the British but was unable to set sail before further privateering was prohibited.

Fanning returned to the United States and on November 21, 1784, married Elizabeth Smith at Stonington, Connecticut. The couple had six children, five dying in infancy. Fanning was commissioned a lieutenant in the U.S. Navy on December 5, 1804. Stationed at Charleston, South Carolina, Lieutenant Fanning died of yellow fever on September 30, 1805, while commanding Gunboat No. 1. His memoirs were published after his death.

During the American Revolution, two of Fanning's brothers, Gilbert and Thomas, were captured while serving aboard an American privateer and held prisoner on the prison hulk HMS Jersey, where Gilbert died. Fanning was also the brother of explorer Edmund Fanning and a first cousin of celebrated attorney John Wickham.

== Namesake ==
Three ships in the United States Navy have been named USS Fanning in honor of Nathaniel Fanning.
