= Mark 12 torpedo =

- Type: Anti-surface ship torpedo
- Place of origin: United States

Service history
- In service: 1928–1945
- Used by: United States Navy
- Wars: World War II

Production history
- Designer: Naval Torpedo Station
- Designed: 1928
- Manufacturer: Naval Torpedo Station
- No. built: 200

Specifications
- Mass: 3505 pounds
- Length: 271 inches
- Diameter: 21 inches
- Effective firing range: 7000–15,000 yards
- Warhead: Mk 11, TNT
- Warhead weight: 500 pounds
- Detonation mechanism: Mk 3, Mod 1 contact exploder
- Engine: Turbine
- Maximum speed: 27–44 knots
- Guidance system: Gyroscope
- Launch platform: Destroyers

The Mark 12 torpedo was a destroyer-launched anti-surface ship torpedo used by the United States Navy in World War II. It was developed and manufactured by the Naval Torpedo Station in Newport, Rhode Island, which built 200 units. The Mark 12 was similar to the Mark 11 torpedo, but with a lower high speed setting of 44 knots versus 46 knots.

== See also ==
- American 21-inch torpedo
