= Battle of Arawe order of battle =

Composition of American and Japanese forces at the Battle of Arawe

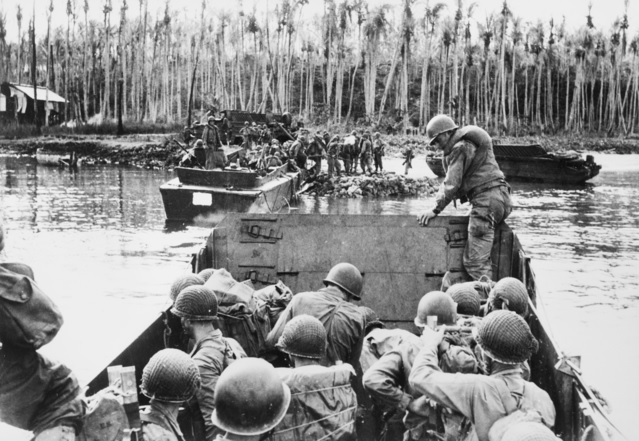
United States landing craft and soldiers approach the beach at Arawe

This is an order of battle listing the Allied and Japanese forces involved in the Battle of Arawe from 15 December 1943 to 24 February 1944.

== Allies ==
=== Ground forces ===
- Director Task Force
  - 112th Cavalry Regimental Combat Team
    - 112th Cavalry Regiment
    - 148th Field Artillery Battalion (12 x 105mm M2A1 howitzers)
    - 59th Engineer Company (Combat)
  - 236th Antiaircraft Artillery Battalion (Searchlight) less elements
  - two batteries of the 470th Antiaircraft Artillery Battalion (Automatic Weapons)
  - A Company, 1st Amphibious Tractor Battalion USMC
  - detachment, 26th Quartermaster War Dog Platoon.
  - B Company, 1st Tank Battalion USMC (arrived 12 January)
  - Engineer, medical, ordnance and other support units
  - 2nd Battalion, 158th Infantry Regiment (force reserve)
    - G Company (arrived about 18 December)
    - F Company (arrived about 10 January)

=== Naval forces ===
- Task Force 74.1 (covering force)
  - Rear Admiral Victor Crutchley
  - Cruisers
    - HMAS Australia (flagship)
    - HMAS Shropshire
  - Destroyers
    - HMAS Arunta
    - HMAS Warramunga
    - USS Ralph Talbot
    - USS Helm
- Task Force 76
  - Destroyers
    - USS Conyngham (flagship)
    - USS Shaw
    - USS Drayton
    - USS Bagley
    - USS Reid
    - USS Smith
    - USS Lamson
    - USS Flusser
    - USS Mahan
  - Transport group
    - USS Humphreys
    - USS Sands
    - HMAS Westralia
    - USS Carter Hall
    - two patrol craft
    - two submarine chasers
  - Service group
    - three LSTs
    - three tug boats
    - USS Rigel
  - Elements, Boat Battalion, 592nd Engineer Boat and Short Regiment, 2nd Engineer Special Brigade (17 x LCVP, 9 x LCM, 2 rocket-firing DUKWs, 1 x repair and salvage boat)
- Beach Party Number 1

== Japan ==
=== Ground forces ===
- Merkus Garrison (withdrew after the Allied landing)
  - Two provisional companies drawn from the 51st Division.
- Komori Force
  - 1st Battalion, 81st Infantry Regiment (headquarters, two rifle companies, one machine gun platoon only, arrived 25 December)
    - Company, 54th Infantry Regiment
    - Engineers
  - 1st Battalion, 141st Infantry Regiment (arrived 29 December)
  - Detachments from other units were also assigned to the Arawe area

=== Naval forces ===
- Southeast Area Fleet / 25th Air Flotilla (sub-unit of 11th Air Fleet)
  - 201 Air Group (Lakunai Airfield, Rabaul)
  - 204 Air Group (Lakunai)
  - 253 Air Group (Tobera Airfield, Rabaul)
- 2nd Air Flotilla (sub-unit of 1st Air Fleet)
  - Hiyō fighter group (Kavieng/Lakunai)
  - Ryūhō fighter group (Kavieng/Lakunai)
  - Jun'yō fighter group (Lakunai)
