= Task Force 67 =

Task Force 67, also called the Cactus Strike Force, was created by William Halsey, Jr. during the Guadalcanal Campaign of World War II and consisted of several destroyers and cruisers:

- Northampton-class heavy cruiser Northampton
- New Orleans-class heavy cruiser
  - Minneapolis
  - New Orleans
- Pensacola-class heavy cruiser Pensacola

- Brooklyn-class light cruiser
  - Nashville
  - Helena
  - St. Louis
  - Honolulu

- Fletcher-class destroyer
  - Fletcher
  - Nicholas
  - O'Bannon
  - Strong
  - De Haven
- Mahan-class destroyer
  - Drayton
  - Perkins
  - Lamson
- Gridley-class destroyer Maury
- Gleaves-class destroyer Lardner

== Battles ==
- Battle of Tassafaronga
- Battle of Munda Point

== Command ==
- RADM Carleton H. Wright upon creation
- RADM Walden L. Ainsworth after the Battle of Tassafaronga
