= Battle of Tassafaronga =

1942 naval battle in the Pacific theater of World War II

- Part of the Pacific Theater of World War II
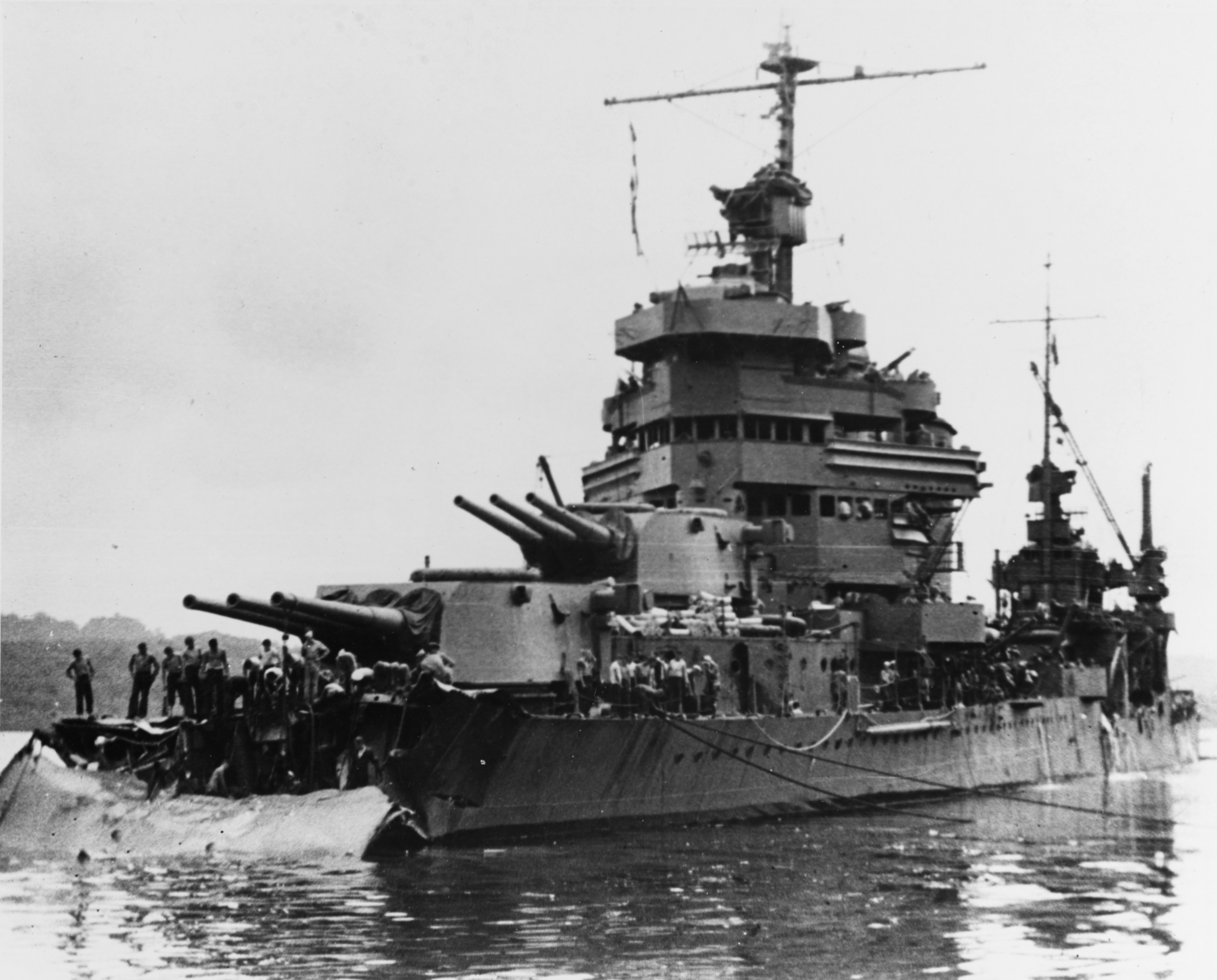
- USS Minneapolis at Tulagi with torpedo damage, 1 December 1942
Date	30 November 1942
Location	Off Tassafaronga, Pacific Ocean
Result	Japanese victory

Belligerents
Japan	United States

Commanders and leaders
Raizō Tanaka; Sato Torajiro; Giichiro Nakahara	Carleton H. Wright; Mahlon S. Tisdale; William M. Cole; Laurence A. Abercrombie

Units involved
8th Fleet: Destroyer Squadron 2	Sixth Fleet: Task Force 67

Strength
8 destroyers	4 heavy cruisers 1 light cruiser 6 destroyers

Casualties and losses
197–211 killed 1 destroyer sunk	395–417 killed 1 heavy cruiser sunk 3 heavy cruisers severely damaged

The Battle of Tassafaronga, sometimes referred to as the Fourth Battle of Savo Island or in Japanese sources as the Battle of Lunga Point (ルンガ沖夜戦; "Naval Battle of Lunga"), was a nighttime naval battle that took place on 30 November 1942 between United States Navy and Imperial Japanese Navy warships during the Guadalcanal campaign. The battle took place in Ironbottom Sound near Tassafaronga Point on Guadalcanal.

In the battle, a US force of five cruisers and four destroyers under the command of Rear Admiral Carleton H. Wright intercepted eight Japanese destroyers attempting to deliver food to their forces on Guadalcanal. The US destroyers waited four minutes after radar contact for permission to launch torpedoes and missed the optimal firing position; the torpedoes all missed, and the destroyers retired. The US cruisers opened fire and sank one destroyer. The muzzle flashes exposed the US cruisers' positions. Under the command of Rear Admiral Raizō Tanaka, Japanese destroyers quickly launched Type 93 "Long Lance" torpedoes, sinking one US cruiser and heavily damaging three others. The rest of Tanaka's force escaped undamaged but failed to complete the intended supply mission.

Rear Admiral Samuel J. Cox, director of the Naval History and Heritage Command, considers this battle and the Battle of Savo Island to be two of the worst defeats in US naval history, behind only Pearl Harbor.

== Background ==
=== Guadalcanal campaign ===
On 7 August 1942 Allied forces landed on Guadalcanal, Tulagi, and the Florida Islands in the Solomon Islands. The landings were meant to deny the Japanese access to bases that they could use to threaten supply routes between the US and Australia, and to secure the islands as starting points for a campaign with the eventual goal of neutralizing the major Japanese base at Rabaul while also supporting the Allied New Guinea campaign. The landings began the six-month Guadalcanal campaign.

The 2,000 to 3,000 Japanese personnel on the islands were taken by complete surprise, and by nightfall on 8 August, the 11,000 Allied troops, under the command of Lieutenant General Alexander Vandegrift, secured Tulagi and nearby small islands as well as the Japanese airfield under construction at Lunga Point on Guadalcanal, named "Henderson Field" by the Allies. Allied aircraft operating from Henderson were called the "Cactus Air Force" (CAF) after the Allied code name for Guadalcanal. To protect the airfield, the US Marines established a perimeter defense around Lunga Point. Reinforcements over the next two months increased the number of US troops at Lunga Point on Guadalcanal to more than 20,000.

In response to the Allied landings on Guadalcanal, the Japanese Imperial General Headquarters assigned the Imperial Japanese Army's 17th Army, a corps-sized command based at Rabaul and under the command of Lieutenant General Harukichi Hyakutake, the task of retaking the island. The first units of the 17th Army began to arrive there on August 19.

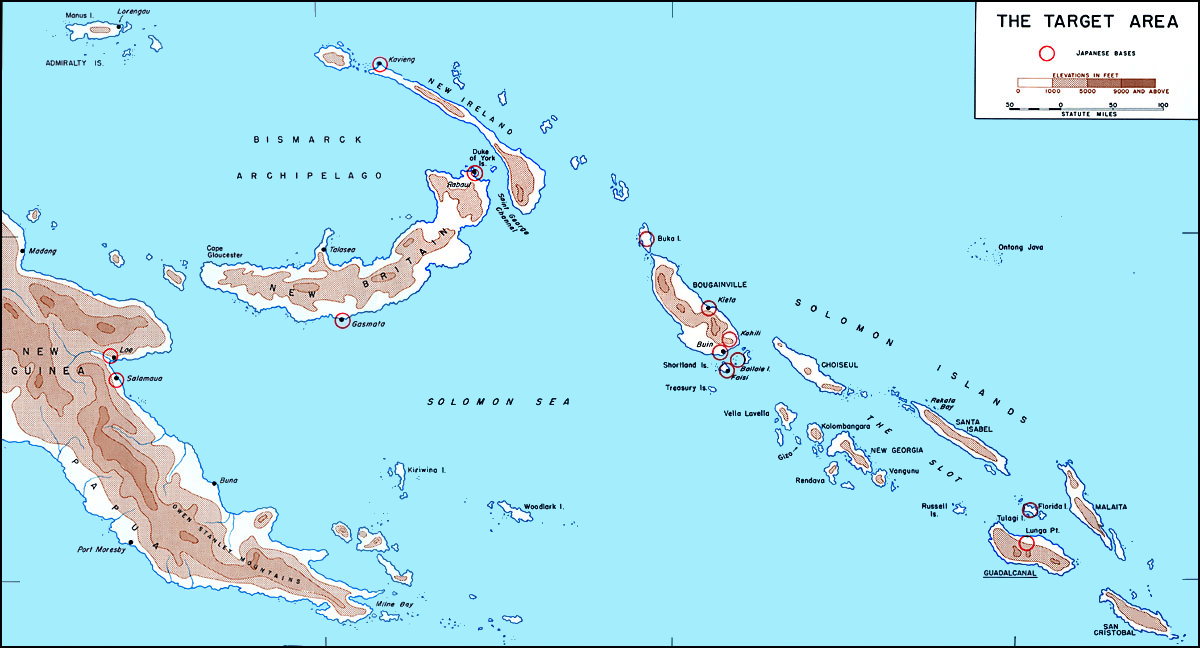
The Solomon Islands. "The Slot" (New Georgia Sound) runs down the center of the islands, from Bougainville and the Shortlands (center) to Guadalcanal (lower right).

Because of the threat by CAF aircraft based at Henderson Field, the Japanese were rarely able to use large, slow transport ships or barges to deliver troops and supplies to the island; instead, they used warships based at Rabaul and the Shortland Islands to carry their forces to Guadalcanal. The Japanese warships, mainly light cruisers and destroyers from the Eighth Fleet under the command of Vice Admiral Gunichi Mikawa, were usually able to make the round trip down "The Slot" to Guadalcanal and back in a single night, thereby minimizing their exposure to CAF air attack. Delivering the troops in this manner, however, prevented most of the soldiers' heavy equipment and supplies, such as heavy artillery, vehicles, and much food and ammunition, from being carried to Guadalcanal with them. These high-speed warship runs to Guadalcanal occurred throughout the campaign and were later called the "Tokyo Express" by Allied forces and "Rat Transportation" by the Japanese.

The Japanese attempted several times between August and November 1942 to recapture Henderson Field and drive Allied forces from Guadalcanal, to no avail. The last attempt by the Japanese to deliver significant additional forces to the island failed during the Naval Battle of Guadalcanal of 12–15 November.

On 26 November Japanese Lieutenant General Hitoshi Imamura took command of the new Eighth Area Army at Rabaul. The command encompassed both Hyakutake's 17th Army in the Solomons and the 18th Army in New Guinea. One of Imamura's first priorities upon assuming command was the continuation of the attempts to retake Henderson Field and Guadalcanal. However, the Allied attempt to take Buna in New Guinea changed Imamura's priorities; it was considered a more severe threat to Rabaul, and Imamura postponed further major reinforcement efforts to Guadalcanal to concentrate on the situation in New Guinea.

=== Supply crisis ===
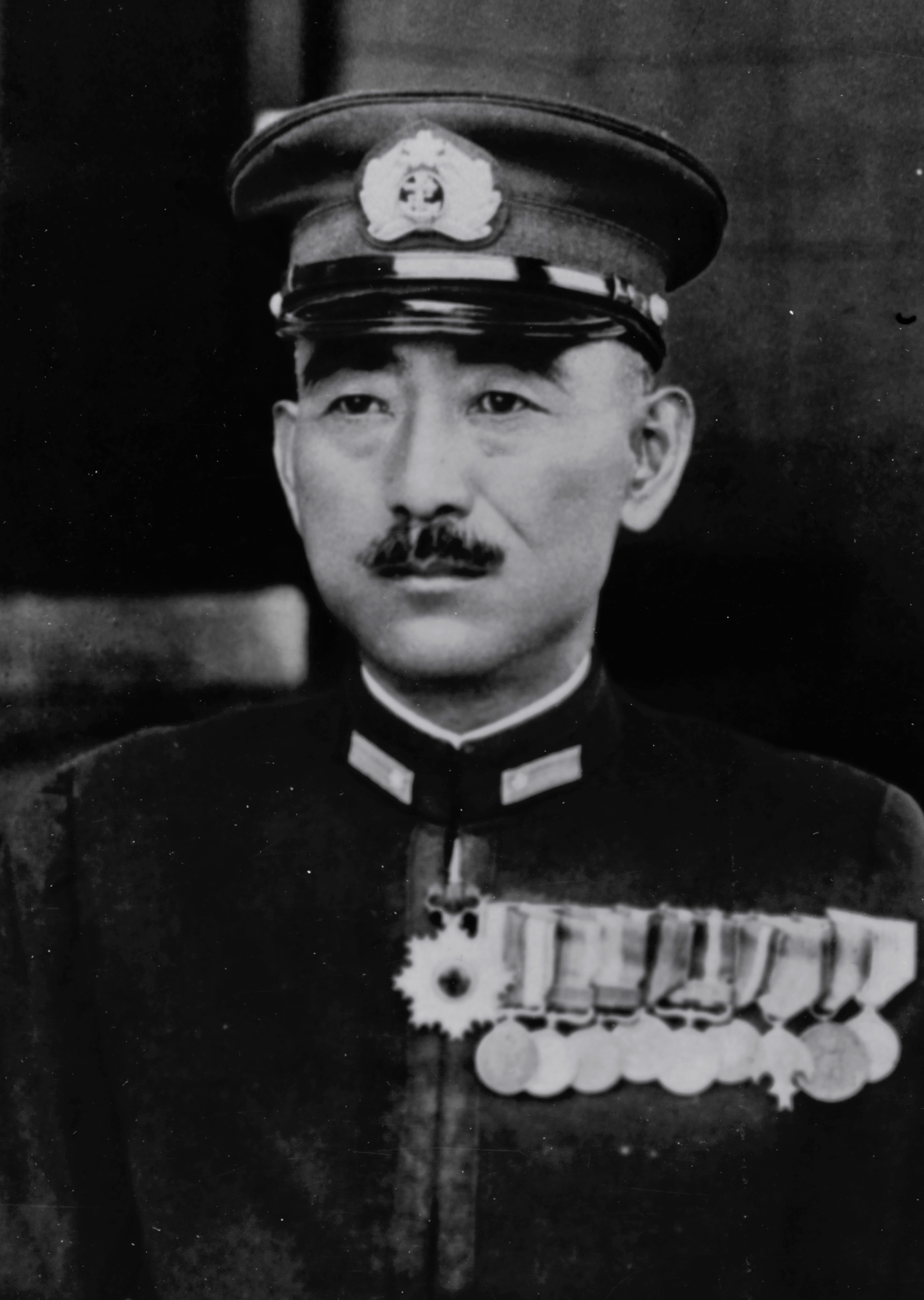
Raizō Tanaka

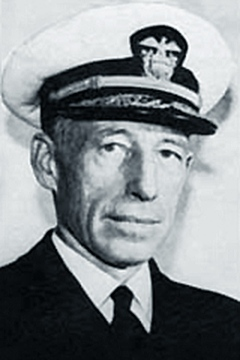
Carleton H. Wright

The combination of threats from CAF aircraft, US Navy PT boats stationed at Tulagi, and a cycle of bright moonlight caused the Japanese to rely on submarines to deliver provisions to their forces on Guadalcanal. Beginning on 16 November and continuing for the next three weeks, 16 submarines made nocturnal deliveries of foodstuffs to the island, with one submarine making the trip each night. Each submarine could deliver 20 to 30 tons of supplies, about one day's worth of food for the 17th Army, but the difficult task of transporting the supplies by hand through the jungle to the frontline units limited their value to sustain the Japanese troops on Guadalcanal. At the same time, the Japanese tried to establish a chain of three bases in the central Solomons to allow small boats to use them as staging sites for making supply deliveries to Guadalcanal, but damaging Allied airstrikes on the bases forced the abandonment of this plan.

On 26 November the 17th Army notified Imamura that it faced a critical food crisis. Some front-line units had not been resupplied for six days, and even the rear-area troops were on one-third rations. The situation forced the Japanese to return to using destroyers to deliver the necessary supplies.

Eighth Fleet personnel devised a plan to help reduce the exposure of destroyers delivering supplies to Guadalcanal. Large oil or gas drums were cleaned and filled with medical supplies and food, with enough air space to provide buoyancy, and strung together with rope. When the destroyers arrived at Guadalcanal they would make a sharp turn, the drums would be cut loose, and a swimmer or boat from the shore could pick up the buoyed end of the rope and return it to the beach, where the soldiers could haul in the supplies.

The Eighth Fleet's Guadalcanal Reinforcement Unit, based in the Shortland Islands and under the command of Rear Admiral Raizō Tanaka, was tasked by Mikawa with making the first of five scheduled runs using the drum method on the night of 30 November. Tanaka's unit was centered on the eight ships of Destroyer Squadron (Desron) 2, with six destroyers assigned to carry from 200 to 240 drums of supplies apiece, to Tassafaronga Point. Tanaka's flagship Naganami along with Takanami acted as escorts. The six drum-carrying destroyers were Kuroshio, Oyashio, Kagerō, Suzukaze, Kawakaze, and Makinami. To save weight, the drum-carrying destroyers left their reloads of Type 93 torpedoes (Long Lances) at the Shortlands, leaving each ship with eight torpedoes, one for each tube.

After the Naval Battle of Guadalcanal, US Vice Admiral William Halsey, commander of Allied forces, South Pacific Area, had reorganized US naval forces under his command, including, on 24 November, the formation of Task Force 67 (TF67) at Espiritu Santo, comprising the heavy cruisers USS Minneapolis, New Orleans, Pensacola, and Northampton, the light cruiser Honolulu, and four destroyers (Fletcher, Drayton, Maury, and Perkins). US Rear Admiral Carleton H. Wright replaced Thomas Kinkaid as commander of TF67 on 28 November.

Upon taking command, Wright briefed his ship commanders on his plan for engaging the Japanese in future; he expected night battles around Guadalcanal. The plan, which he had drafted with Kinkaid, stated that radar-equipped destroyers were to scout in front of the cruisers and deliver a surprise torpedo attack upon sighting Japanese warships, then vacate the area to give the cruisers a clear field of fire. The cruisers were then to engage with gunfire at a range of 10,000 to 12,000 yards (9,100 to 11,000 m). The cruisers' floatplanes would scout and drop flares during the battle.

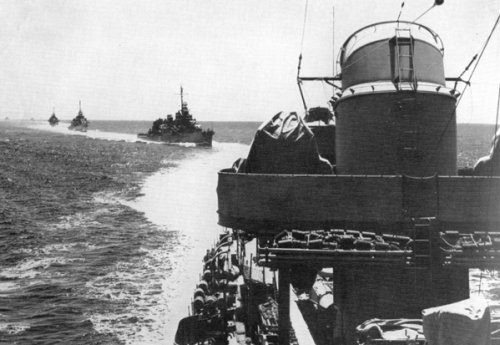
TF67 heads for Guadalcanal on November 30. Fletcher (foreground) is followed by Perkins, Maury, Drayton, and the cruisers (far distance).

On 29 November Allied intelligence personnel intercepted and decoded a Japanese message transmitted to the 17th Army on Guadalcanal alerting them to Tanaka's supply run. Informed of the message, Halsey ordered Wright to take TF67 to intercept Tanaka off Guadalcanal. TF67, with Wright flying his flag on Minneapolis, departed Espiritu Santo at 27 knots (31 mph; 50 km/h) just before midnight on 29 November for the 580 miles (930 km) run to Guadalcanal. En route, destroyers Lamson and Lardner, returning from a convoy escort assignment to Guadalcanal, were ordered to join up with TF67. Lacking the time to brief the commanding officers of the joining destroyers of his battle plan, Wright assigned them a position behind the cruisers. At 17:00 on 30 November, Wright's cruisers launched one floatplane each for Tulagi to drop flares during the expected battle that night. At 20:00, Wright sent his crews to battle stations.

Tanaka's force departed the Shortlands in the early morning of 30 November for the run to Guadalcanal. Tanaka attempted to evade Allied aerial reconnaissance aircraft by first heading northeast through Bougainville Strait before turning southeast and then south to pass through Indispensable Strait. Paul Mason, an Australian coastwatcher stationed in southern Bougainville, reported by radio the departure of Tanaka's ships from Shortland, and this message was passed to Wright. At the same time, a Japanese search aircraft spotted an Allied convoy near Guadalcanal and communicated the sighting to Tanaka who told his destroyer commanders to expect action that night and that, "In such an event, utmost efforts will be made to destroy the enemy without regard for the unloading of supplies."

== Battle ==
=== Order of battle ===
United States Task Force 67			Japan Destroyer Squadron 2		
TF/TG	Vessel (Note: ^{(g)}: SG onboard; SG radar detects surface craft and is also useful for night navigation.^{(x)}: CXAM onboard; CXAM radar is a medium range radar to detect both ships and aircraft.)	Commander (Note: Officer in tactical command is in bold)	TF	Vessel	Commander
Vanguard TG 67.4	Fletcher (DD)^{(g)}	**Cdr. William M. Cole**		Des Div 31	
Vanguard TG 67.4	Perkins (DD)^{(g)}	Lt. Cdr. Walter Chilcott Ford	Escort Force	Naganami (DD) (FF)	**Rear Admiral Raizō Tanaka** Cdr. Kumabe Tsutau
Vanguard TG 67.4	Maury (DD)	Lt. Cdr. Gelzer Loyall Sims	Escort Force	Takanami (DD)	Cdr. Ogura Masami
Vanguard TG 67.4	Drayton (DD)^{(g)}	Lt. Cdr. Jacob Elliott Cooper	Transport Force 1 (to Tassafaronga Point)	Makinami (DD)	Cdr. Hitomi Toyoji
TF 67.2	Minneapolis (CA)^{(g)}	**Rear Admiral Carleton H. Wright**; Capt. Charles E. Rosendahl	Transport Force 1 (to Tassafaronga Point)	Des Div 15	
TF 67.2	New Orleans (CA)^{(g)}	Capt. Clifford H. Roper	Transport Force 1 (to Tassafaronga Point)	Oyashio (DD)	**Capt. Sato Torajiro**; Lt. Cdr. Hideo Azuma
TF 67.2	Pensacola (CA)	Capt. Frank L. Lowe	Transport Force 1 (to Tassafaronga Point)	Kuroshio (DD)	Cdr. Hajimi Takeuchi
TG 67.2.3	Honolulu (CL)^{(g)}	**Rear Admiral Mahlon S. Tisdale** Capt. Robert W. Hayler	Transport Force 1 (to Tassafaronga Point)	Kagero (DD)	Cdr. Terumichi Arimoto
TG 67.2.3	Northampton (CA)^{(x)}	Capt. Willard A. Kitts III		Des Div 24	
Rearguard	Lamson (DD)	**Cdr. Laurence A. Abercrombie**; Lt. Cdr. Phillip Henry Fitzgerald	Transport Force 2	Kawakaze (DD)	**Cdr. Giichiro Nakahara**; Lt. Cdr. Yoshio Yanase
Rearguard	Lardner (DD)	Lt. Cdr. Willard M. Sweeter	Transport Force 2	Suzukaze (DD)	Lt. Cdr. Kazuo Shibayama

=== Prelude ===
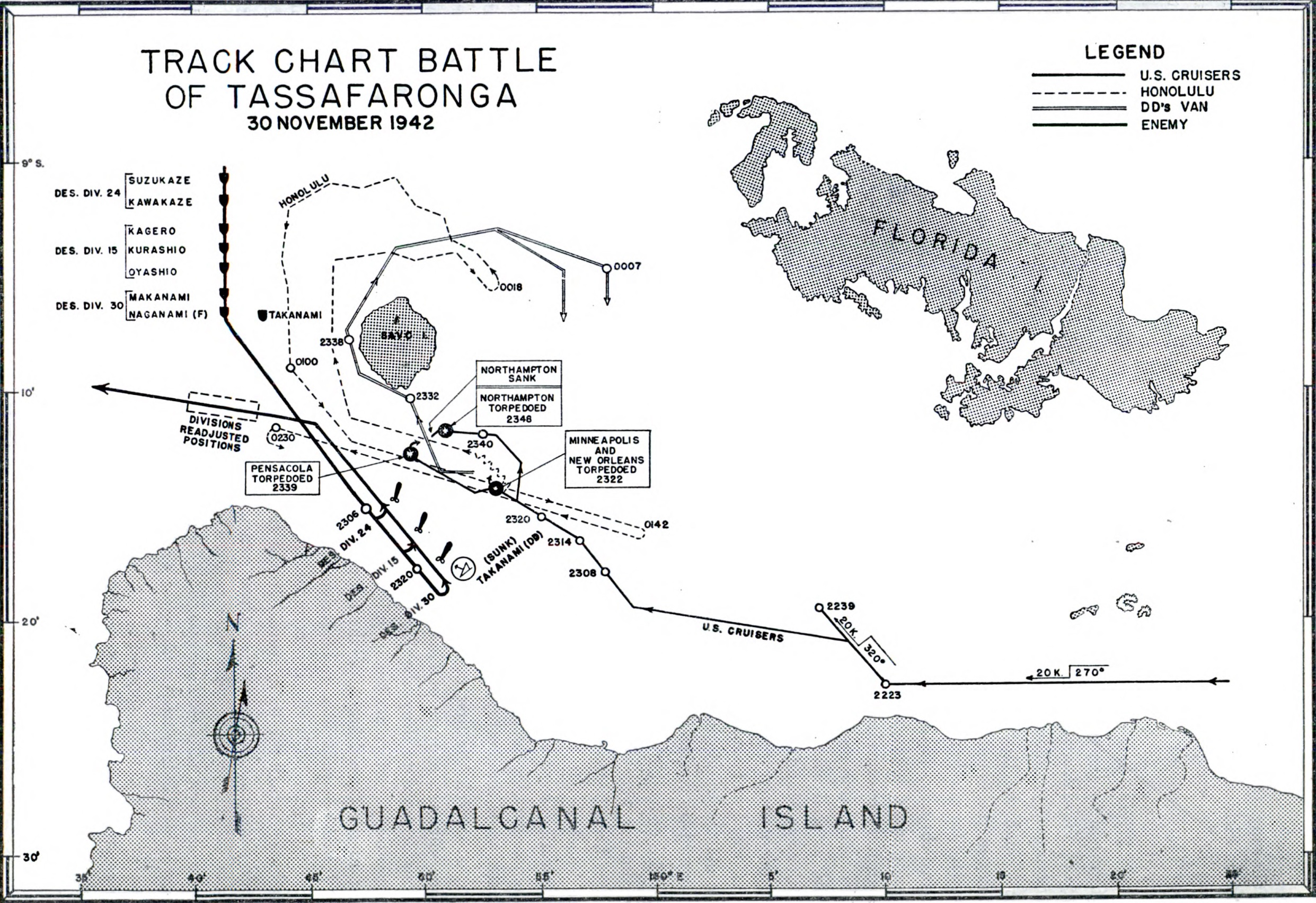
US Navy chart of the Battle of Tassafaronga based on accounts by both Japanese and US participants

At 21:40 on 30 November, Tanaka's ships sighted Savo Island from Indispensable Strait. The Japanese ships were in line ahead formation, interval 600 metres (660 yd), in the order of Takanami, Oyashio, Kuroshio, Kagerō, Makinami, Naganami, Kawakaze, and Suzukaze. At this same time, TF67 entered Lengo Channel en route to Ironbottom Sound. Wright's ships were in column in the order Fletcher, Perkins, Maury, Drayton, Minneapolis, New Orleans, Pensacola, Honolulu, Northampton, Lamson, and Lardner. The four van destroyers led the cruisers by 4,000 yards (3,700 m) and the cruisers steamed 1,000 yards (910 m) apart.

At 22:40 Tanaka's ships passed south of Savo about 3 miles (5 km) offshore from Guadalcanal and slowed to 12 knots (14 mph; 22 km/h) as they approached the unloading area. Takanami took station about 1 mile (2 km) seaward to screen the column. At the same time, TF67 exited Lengo Channel into the sound and headed at 20 knots (23 mph; 37 km/h) towards Savo Island. Wright's van destroyers moved to a position slightly inshore of the cruisers. The night sky was moonless (the third-quarter moon would rise after midnight, after the fight was over) with between 2 miles (3 km) and 7 miles (11 km) of visibility. Because of extremely calm seas, which created a suction effect on their pontoons, Wright's cruiser floatplanes were delayed in lifting off from Tulagi harbor and would not be a factor in the battle.

At 23:06, Wright's force began to detect Tanaka's ships on radar near Cape Esperance on Guadalcanal about 23,000 yards (21,000 m) away. Wright's destroyers rejoined the column as it continued to head towards Savo. At the same time, Tanaka's ships, which were not equipped with radar, split into two groups and prepared to shove the drums overboard. Naganami, Kawakaze, and Suzukaze headed for their drop-off point near Doma Reef while Makinami, Kagerō, Oyashio, and Kuroshio aimed for nearby Tassafaronga. At 23:12, Takanami's crew visually sighted Wright's column, quickly confirmed by lookouts on Tanaka's other ships. At 23:16, Tanaka ordered unloading preparations halted and "All ships attack."

=== Action ===
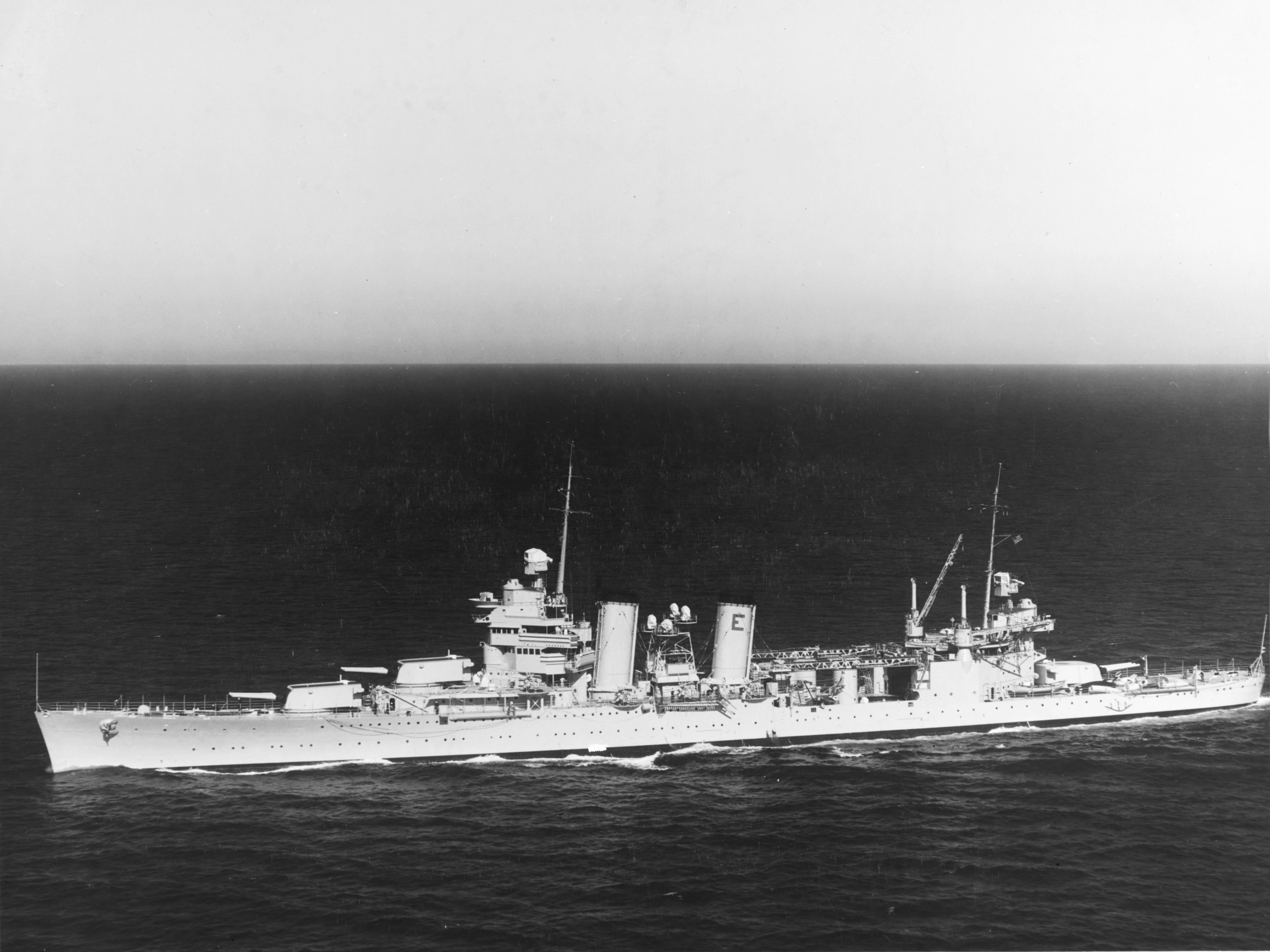
USS Minneapolis

At 23:14, operators on Fletcher established firm radar contact with Takanami and the lead group of four drum-carrying destroyers. At 23:15, with the range 7,000 yards (6,400 m), Commander William M. Cole, commander of Wright's destroyer group and captain of Fletcher, radioed Wright for permission to fire torpedoes. Wright waited two minutes and then responded with, "Range on bogies [Tanaka's ships on radar] excessive at present." Cole responded that the range was fine. Another two minutes passed before Wright responded with permission to fire. In the meantime, the US destroyers' targets escaped from an optimum firing setup ahead to a marginal position passing abeam, giving the American torpedoes a long overtaking run near the limit of their range. At 23:20, Fletcher, Perkins, and Drayton fired 20 Mark 15 torpedoes towards Tanaka's ships. Maury, lacking SG radar and thus having no contacts, withheld fire.

At the same time, Wright ordered his force to open fire. At 23:21, Minneapolis complied with her first salvo, quickly followed by the other American cruisers. Cole's four destroyers fired star shells to illuminate the targets as previously directed then increased speed to clear the area for the cruisers to operate.

Because of her closer proximity to Wright's column, Takanami was the target of most of the Americans' initial gunfire. Takanami returned fire and launched her full load of eight torpedoes but was quickly hit by American gunfire and, within four minutes, was set afire and incapacitated. As Takanami was destroyed, the rest of Tanaka's ships, almost unnoticed by the Americans, were increasing speed, maneuvering, and preparing to respond to the American attack. All of the American torpedoes missed. Historian Russell S. Crenshaw Jr. postulates that had the 24 Mark 15 torpedoes fired by US Navy destroyers during the battle not been fatally flawed, the outcome of the battle might have been different.

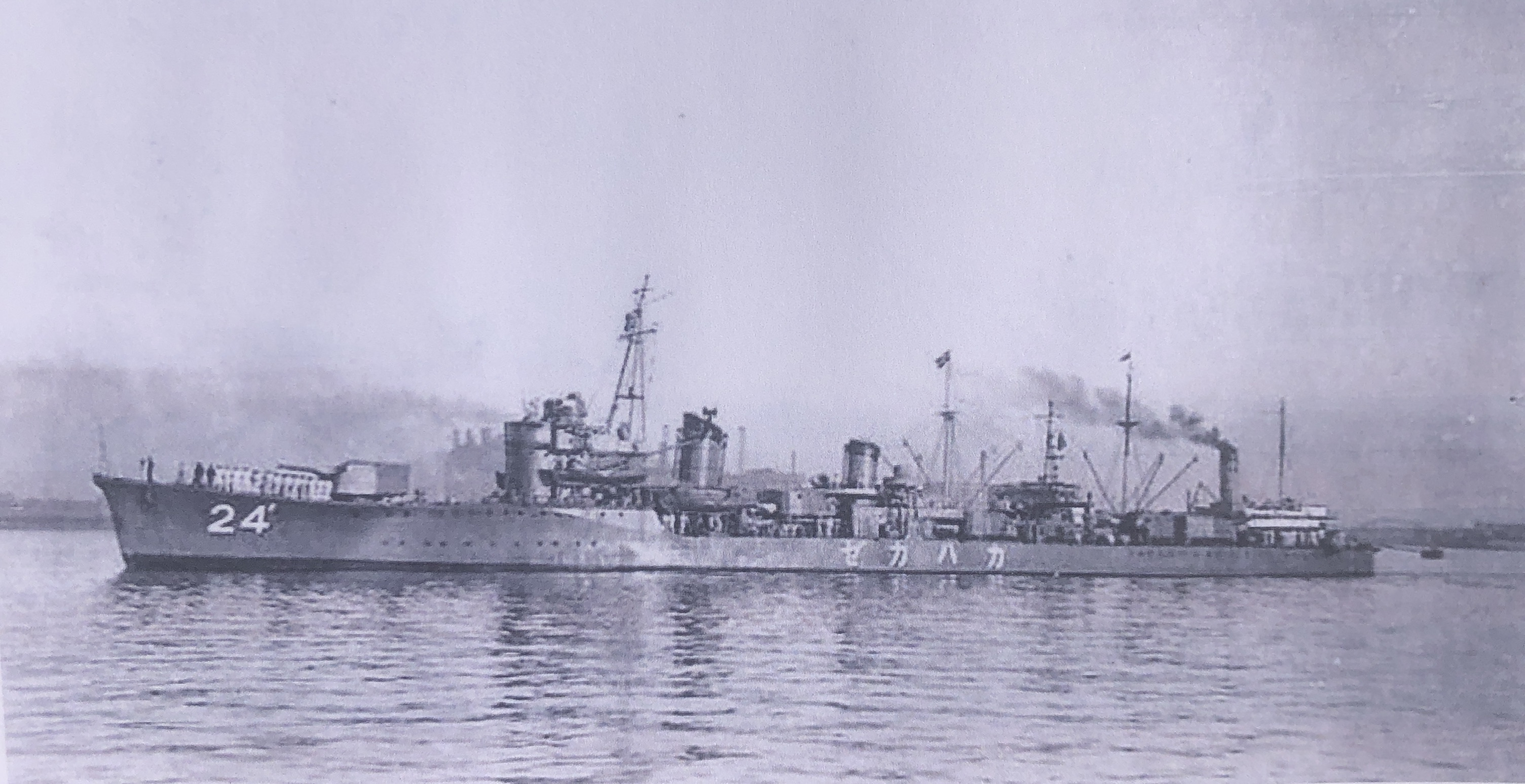
Japanese destroyer Kawakaze

Tanaka's flagship Naganami reversed course to starboard, opened fire and began laying a smoke screen. The next two ships astern, Kawakaze and Suzukaze, reversed course to port. At 23:23, Suzukaze fired eight torpedoes in the direction of the gunflashes from Wright's cruisers, followed by Naganami and Kawakaze which fired their full loads of eight torpedoes at 23:32 and 23:33 respectively.

Meanwhile, the four destroyers at the head of the Japanese column maintained their heading down the Guadalcanal coast, allowing Wright's cruisers to pass on the opposite course. Once clear of Takanami at 23:28, Kuroshio fired four and Oyashio fired eight torpedoes in the direction of Wright's column and then reversed course and increased speed. Wright's cruisers maintained the same course and speed as the 44 Japanese torpedoes headed in their direction.

At 23:27, as Minneapolis fired her ninth salvo and Wright prepared to order a course change for his column, two torpedoes, from either Suzukaze or Takanami, struck her forward half. One warhead exploded the aviation fuel storage tanks forward of turret one and the other knocked out three of the ship's four firerooms. The bow forward of turret one folded down at a 70-degree angle, and the ship lost power and steering control. Thirty-seven men were killed.

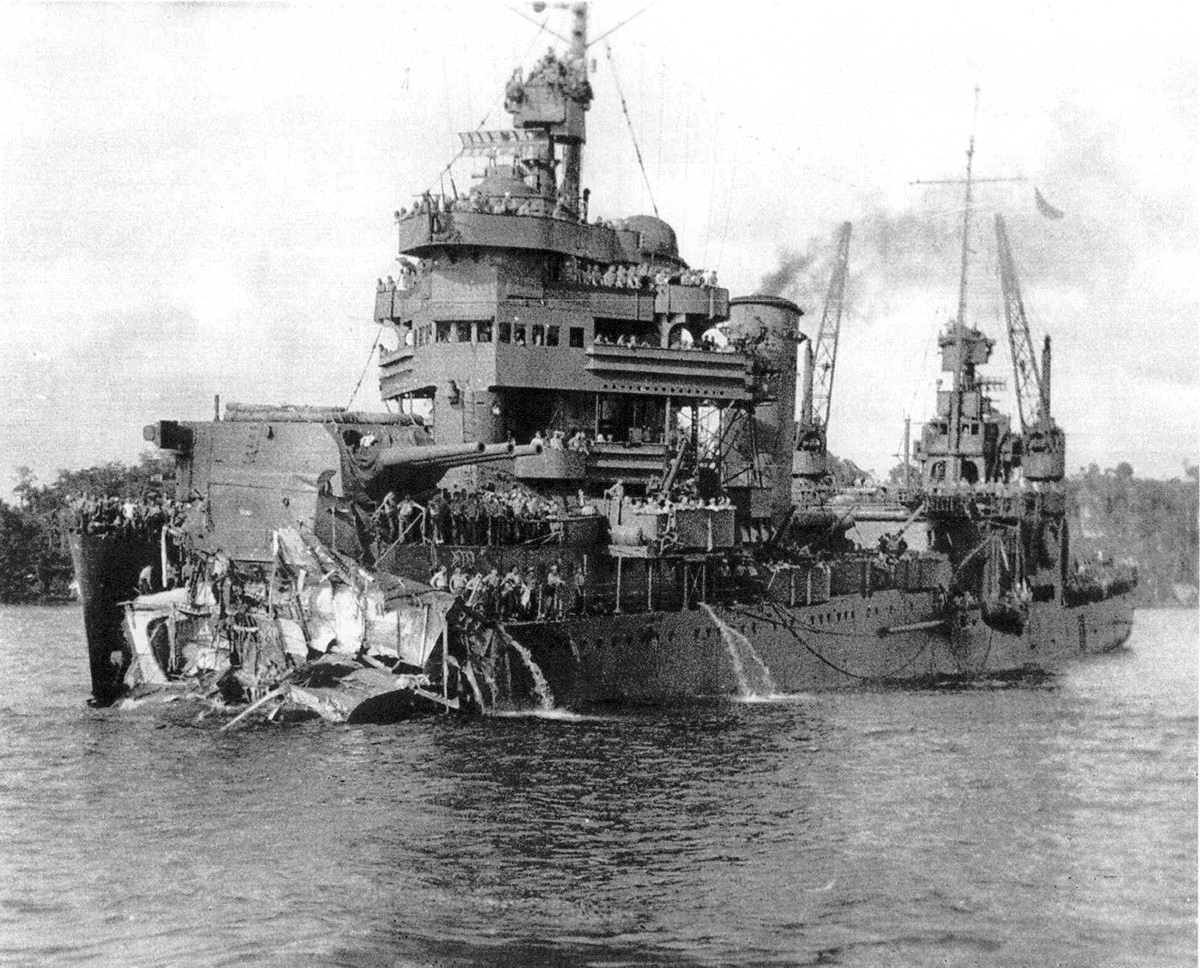
New Orleans near Tulagi the morning after the battle, showing everything missing forward of turret two.

Less than a minute later a torpedo hit New Orleans abreast of turret one and exploded the ship's forward ammunition magazines and aviation gasoline storage. The blast severed the ship's entire bow forward of turret two. The bow twisted to port, damaging the ship's hull as it was wrenched free by the ship's momentum, and sank immediately off the aft port quarter. Everyone in turrets one and two perished. New Orleans was forced into a reverse course to starboard and lost steering and communications. A total of 183 men were killed. Herbert Brown, a seaman in the ship's plotting room, described the scene after the torpedo hit:

I had to see. I walked alongside the silent turret two and was stopped by a lifeline stretched from the outboard port lifeline to the side of the turret. Thank God it was there, for one more step and I would have pitched head first into the dark water thirty feet below. The bow was gone. One hundred and twenty five feet of ship and number one main battery turret with three 8 inch guns were gone. Eighteen hundred tons of ship were gone. Oh my God, all those guys I went through boot camp with – all gone.

Pensacola followed next astern in the cruiser column. Observing Minneapolis and New Orleans taking hits and slowing, Pensacola steered to pass them on the port side and then, once past, returned to the same base course. At 23:39, Pensacola took a torpedo, fired from Oyashio, abreast the mainmast. The explosion spread flaming oil throughout the interior and across the main deck of the ship, killing 125 of the ship's crew. The hit ripped away the port outer driveshaft, and the ship took a 13-degree list and lost power, communications, and steering.

Astern of Pensacola, Honolulu's captain chose to pass Minneapolis and New Orleans on the starboard side. At the same time, the ship increased speed to 30 knots (35 mph; 56 km/h), maneuvered radically, and successfully transited the battle area without taking any damage while maintaining main battery fire at the rapidly disappearing Japanese destroyers.

The last cruiser in the American column, Northampton, followed Honolulu to pass the damaged cruisers ahead to starboard. Unlike Honolulu, Northampton did not increase speed or attempt any radical maneuvers. At 23:48, after returning to the base course, Northampton was hit by two of Kawakaze's torpedoes. One hit 10 feet (3 m) below the waterline abreast the after engine room, and the second hit 40 feet (12 m) further aft. The after engine room flooded, three of four shafts ceased turning, and the ship listed 10 degrees to port and caught fire. Fifty men were killed.

The last ships in Wright's column, Lamson and Lardner, failed to locate any targets and exited the battle area to the east after being mistakenly fired on by machine guns from New Orleans. Cole's four destroyers circled completely around Savo Island at maximum speed and reentered the battle area, but the engagement had already ended.

Meanwhile, at 23:44 Tanaka ordered his ships to break contact and retire from the battle area. As they proceeded up Guadalcanal's coast, Kuroshio and Kagerō fired eight more torpedoes towards the American ships, which all missed. When Takanami failed to respond to radio calls, Tanaka directed Oyashio and Kuroshio to go to her assistance. The two destroyers located the burning ship at 01:00 on 1 December but abandoned rescue efforts after detecting American warships in the area. Oyashio and Kuroshio quickly departed the sound to rejoin the rest of Tanaka's ships for the return journey to the Shortlands, which they reached 10 hours later. Takanami was the only Japanese warship hit by American gunfire and seriously damaged during the battle.

== Aftermath ==
Takanami's surviving crew abandoned ship at 01:30, but a large explosion killed many more of them in the water, including the destroyer division commander, Toshio Shimizu, and the ship's captain, Masami Ogura. Of her crew of 244, 48 survived to reach shore on Guadalcanal, and 19 of them were captured by the Americans.

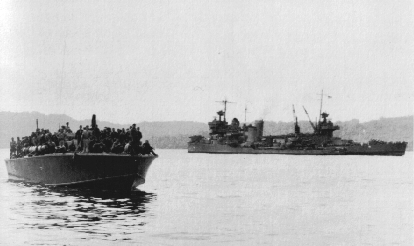
A PT boat carries Northampton survivors near Tulagi on the morning of December 1. New Orleans is in the background.

Northampton's crew was unable to contain the ship's fires and list and began to abandon ship at 01:30. The ship sank at 03:04 about 4 nautical miles (7 km; 5 mi) from Doma Cove on Guadalcanal (09°12′S 159°50′E). Fletcher and Drayton rescued the ship's 773 survivors.

Minneapolis, New Orleans, and Pensacola were able to sail the 19 nautical miles (35 km; 22 mi) to Tulagi by the morning of 1 December, where they were berthed for emergency repairs. The fires on Pensacola burned for 12 hours before being extinguished. Pensacola departed Tulagi for rear area ports and further repair on 6 December. After construction of temporary bows from coconut logs, Minneapolis and New Orleans departed Tulagi for Espiritu Santo or Sydney, Australia on 12 December. All three cruisers required lengthy and extensive repairs. New Orleans returned to action in August, Minneapolis in September, and Pensacola in October 1943.

The battle was one of the worst defeats suffered by the US Navy in World War II, third only to the Attack on Pearl Harbor and the Battle of Savo Island. In spite of his defeat in the battle, Wright was awarded the Navy Cross, one of the highest American military decorations for bravery, for his actions during the engagement. Mitigating to some degree the destruction of his task force, Wright, in his after-action report, claimed that his force sank four Japanese destroyers and damaged two others. Halsey, in his comments on Wright's report, placed much of the blame for the defeat on Cole, saying that the destroyer squadron commander fired his torpedoes from too great a distance to be effective and should have "helped" the cruisers instead of circling around Savo Island. Tanaka claimed to have sunk a battleship and two cruisers in the battle. Historian Samuel Eliot Morison assessed the outcome by saying: "It is a painful truth that the Battle of Tassafaronga was a sharp defeat inflicted on an alert and superior cruiser force by a partially surprised and inferior destroyer force." Wright was subsequently reassigned to shore duty and received no further promotion in rank.

After the war, Tanaka said of his victory at Tassafaronga, "I have heard that US naval experts praised my command in that action. I am not deserving of such honors. It was the superb proficiency and devotion of the men who served me that produced the tactical victory for us." As for the US Navy, he said: "The enemy had discovered our plans and movements, had put planes in the air beforehand for purposes of illumination, had got into formation for an artillery engagement, and cleverly gained the advantage of prior neutralization fire. But his fire was inaccurate, shells improperly set for deflection were especially numerous, and it is conjectured that either his marksmanship is not remarkable or else the illumination from his star shells was not sufficiently effective."

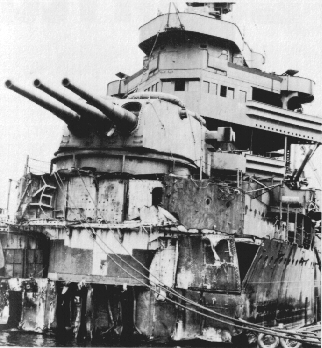
New Orleans 'B' turret following a Japanese torpedo-initiated explosion of the forward magazine.

Cole's experience at Tassafaronga led to Arleigh Burke's standing orders to his own ships that "destroyers are to attack the enemy on first contact without awaiting orders from task force commander," which were instrumental in his success in the battles of Empress Augusta Bay and Cape St. George. Cole also influenced Commander Frederick Moosbrugger's tactics at the Battle of Vella Gulf, in which Moosbrugger withheld gunfire until his own torpedoes were observed hitting enemy ships, surprising the Japanese.

The results of the battle led to further discussion in the US Pacific Fleet about changes in tactical doctrine and the need for technical improvements, such as flashless powder. It was not until eight months later that the naval high command recognized there were serious problems with the functioning of the torpedoes. The Americans were still unaware of the range and power of Japanese torpedoes and the effectiveness of Japanese night battle tactics. In fact, Wright claimed that his ships must have been fired on by submarines since the observed position of Tanaka's ships "make it improbable that torpedoes with speed–distance characteristics similar to our own" could have caused such damage. The Americans would not recognize the true capabilities of their Pacific adversary's torpedoes and night tactics until well into 1943.

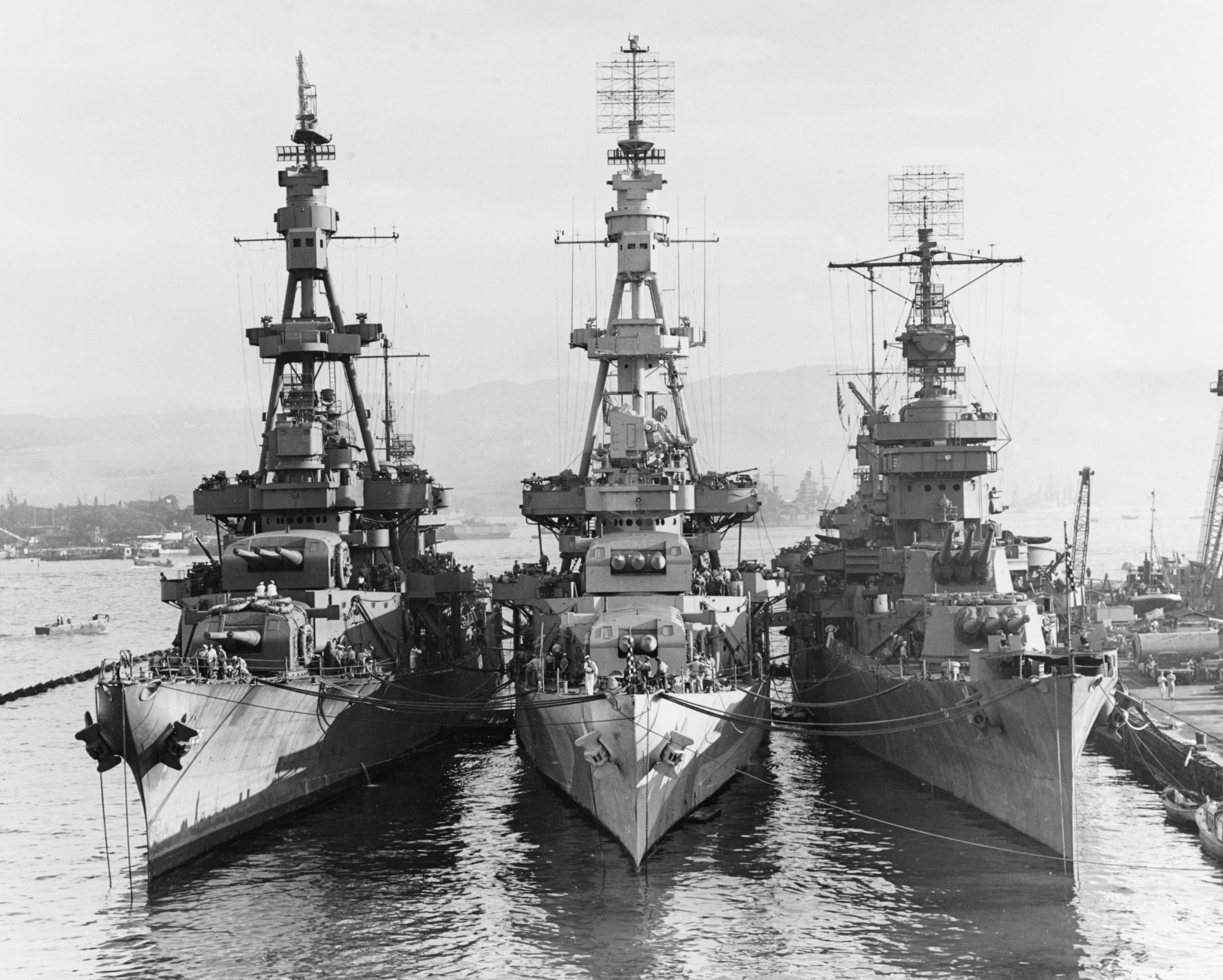
Pensacola (center) and New Orleans (right) (with Salt Lake City) at Pearl Harbor on 31 October 1943 after completion of repairs.

In spite of their defeat in the battle, the Americans had prevented Tanaka from landing the desperately needed food supplies on Guadalcanal, albeit at high cost. A second Japanese supply delivery attempt by ten destroyers led by Tanaka on 3 December successfully dumped 1,500 drums of provisions off Tassafaronga Point, but strafing American aircraft sank all but 310 of them the next day before they could be pulled ashore. On 7 December, a third attempt by 12 destroyers was turned back by US PT boats off Cape Esperance. The next night, two US PT boats torpedoed and sank the Japanese submarine I-3 as it attempted to deliver supplies to Guadalcanal. Based on the difficulties experienced trying to deliver food to the island, the Japanese Navy informed Imamura on 8 December that they intended to stop all destroyer transportation runs to Guadalcanal immediately. After Imamura protested, the navy agreed to one more run to the island.

The last attempt to deliver food to Guadalcanal by destroyers in 1942 was led by Tanaka on the night of 11 December and consisted of 11 destroyers. Five US PT boats met Tanaka off Guadalcanal and torpedoed his flagship Teruzuki, severely damaging the destroyer and injuring Tanaka. After Tanaka transferred to Naganami, Teruzuki was scuttled. Only 220 of the 1,200 drums released that night were recovered by Japanese army personnel on shore. Tanaka was subsequently relieved of command and transferred to Japan on 29 December.

On 12 December the Japanese Navy proposed that Guadalcanal be abandoned. Despite opposition from Japanese Army leaders, who still hoped that Guadalcanal could eventually be retaken from the Allies, on 31 December Japan's Imperial General Headquarters, with approval from Emperor Hirohito, agreed to the evacuation of all Japanese forces from the island and the establishment of a new line of defense for the Solomon Islands on New Georgia. The Japanese evacuated their remaining forces from Guadalcanal over three nights 2–7 February 1943, conceding the hard-fought campaign to the Allies. Building on their success at Guadalcanal and elsewhere, the Allies continued their campaign against Japan, ultimately culminating in Japan's defeat and the end of World War II.

The three Rogers brothers, who all served on New Orleans, died during the Battle of Tassafaronga. Their deaths were similar to the loss of the five Sullivan brothers on Juneau only two weeks earlier. These groups of siblings' deaths led to the Sole Survivor Policy and the military policy that bans family members from serving together in combat areas.
