= Laurence A. Abercrombie =

20th Century American naval officer

Laurence Allen Abercrombie
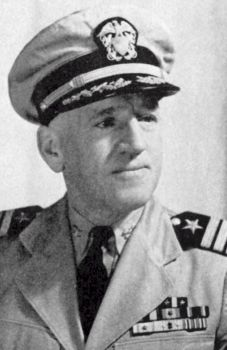
- Born: October 11, 1897; Lawrence, Massachusetts, US
- Died: May 3, 1973 (aged 75); Bethesda, Maryland, US
- Education: United States Naval Academy (1921)
- Military career
- Allegiance: United States
- Branch: United States Navy
- Service years: 1917–1951
- Rank: Rear admiral
- Nickname: "Abe"
- Service number: 56922
- Commands: USS Drayton (DD-366); Destroyer Division 9 USS Chester (CA-27)
- Conflicts: World War I World War II • Battle of Guadalcanal
- Awards: Navy Cross (3)

Laurence Allen Abercrombie (11 Oct 1897 – 3 May 1973) was an American naval officer who reached the rank of Rear Admiral in the United States Navy during World War II. Admiral Abercrombie was thrice awarded the Navy Cross, the United States military's second-highest decoration awarded for valor in combat.

== Biography ==
Laurence Allen Abercrombie was born in Lawrence, Massachusetts, on 11 October 1897, son of John Andrew and Mary Abercrombie (née Davenport). After graduating from high school, Abercrombie attended Phillips Academy in Andover, Massachusetts, before transferring to the United States Naval Academy in Annapolis, Maryland, in 1917. During 1917 and 1918, Abercrombie served as a midshipman aboard the USS Delaware (BB-28), USS Georgia (BB-15), USS Nevada (BB-36), and the USS Mississippi (BB-41). Abercrombie graduated from Annapolis on 3 June 1920 and commissioned as an ensign in the Navy.

Ensign Abercrombie joined the crew of the USS Black Hawk (AD-9) in the Atlantic Fleet. In 1923 the Black Hawk was transferred to the Pacific Fleet and in April 1923, Abercrombie was transferred to the USS Villalobos (PG-42) for a few weeks before being transferred further to the USS Isabel (PY-10). In July 1924, LTJG Abercrombie was transferred to the USS Huron, the Asiatic Fleet's flag ship. In July 1925, LTJG Abercrombie returned to the United States and joined the crew of the USS Utah (BB-31).

After a year aboard the USS Utah, LTJG Abercrombie was transferred to the United States Naval Academy's Department of Modern Languages to teach French. He spent the summer of 1927 in Tours, France. In July 1928 LT Abercrombie finished he teaching assignment and was transferred to the crew of the USS Pittsburgh. In November 1928 LT Abercrombie witnessed the coronation of the new Japanese emperor and future enemy, Emperor Hirohito. In April 1931, LT Abercrombie reported for duty for Bureau of Navigation in Washington, D.C., until August 1933.

The heavy cruiser USS New Orleans (CA-32) was commissioned on 15 February 1934 with LT Abercrombie as a member of her crew, making him a Plankowner on the newly commissioned ship. Abercrombie served aboard the cruiser until May 1937, finishing his time as a communications officer. In June 1937, LCDR Abercrombie returned to Annapolis's Department of Modern Language and studied French further. He spent the summer of 1938 at the embassy in Paris, and later qualified as a French translator and interpreter.

In June 1939 LCDR Abercrombie was transferred to the USS Arizona (BB-39) as a gunnery officer. On 21 March 1941 Abercrombie took command of his first ship, the USS Drayton (DD-366), nicknamed "The Blue Beetle" because of her experimental blueish color. The USS Drayton was in Hawaiian waters during the Japanese attacked on Pearl Harbor Dec 7, 1941, but was not in port, and did not see any action. LCDR Abercrombie engaged and sunk an enemy vessel on December 24, 1941, an action that would result in his first Navy Cross.

CDR Abercrombie was promoted to captain in June 1942, and commanded the USS Drayton until 27 July 1942. CAPT Abercrombie then took command Destroyer Division NINE consisting of the USS Drayton (DD-366), USS Flusser (DD-368), USS Lamson (DD-367), and the USS Mahan (DD-364). On 22 October 1942 CAPT Abercrombie commanded the USS Lamson and USS Mahan on a daylight raid on Japanese forces near the Gilbert Islands. Abercrombie succeeded in sinking two Japanese ships, one being the Japanese gunboat Hakkaisan Maru. The two destroyers were also able to successfully repel Japanese aerial attacks which resulted in no damage to either ship or any casualties. For this action, CAPT Abercrombie was a Gold Star in lieu of a second Navy Cross.

Destroyer Division Nine still under the command of CAPT Abercrombie was attached to Task Unit 62.7.2 near the Solomon Islands. CAPT Abercrombie was designated as Screen Commander, to provide the rest of the unit safety from Japanese torpedo attack planes. On the night of 17 February 1943 radar and Sonar operators under CAPT Abercrombie's command warned the Task Unit Commander of any torpedo attacks allowing him to react accordingly. Five Japanese planes were shot down through the night, but there were no Allied casualties. For this action, CAPT Abercrombie was awarded a second Gold Star in lieu of another Navy Cross.

In August 1943 CAPT Abercrombie was transferred to the Office of the Chief of Naval Operations, Office of Naval Intelligence. Less than a year later in April 1944 CAPT Abercrombie was again transferred, this time to the Joint Chiefs of Staff. After a year with the Joint Chiefs of Staff, CAPT Abercrombie reported to the Naval Training School in San Francisco. In August 1945 CAPT Abercrombie took command of the USS Chester (CA-27) in "mopping up" operations after the Japanese defeat.

In March 1946 CAPT Abercrombie received orders to become the director of the Naval Reserve program in the Potomac River Naval Command. In October 1946 he became assistant to the Assistant Chief of Naval Operations (Naval Reserve) and Chief of Naval Reserve, Rear Admiral John E. Gingrich. CAPT Abercrombie maintained this position until May 1949, then we was transferred to the Office of the Secretary of Defense until his retirement on 30 June 1951. Upon his retirement CAPT Abercrombie was promoted to rear admiral.
