= USS Perkins (DD-377) =

Mahan-class destroyer

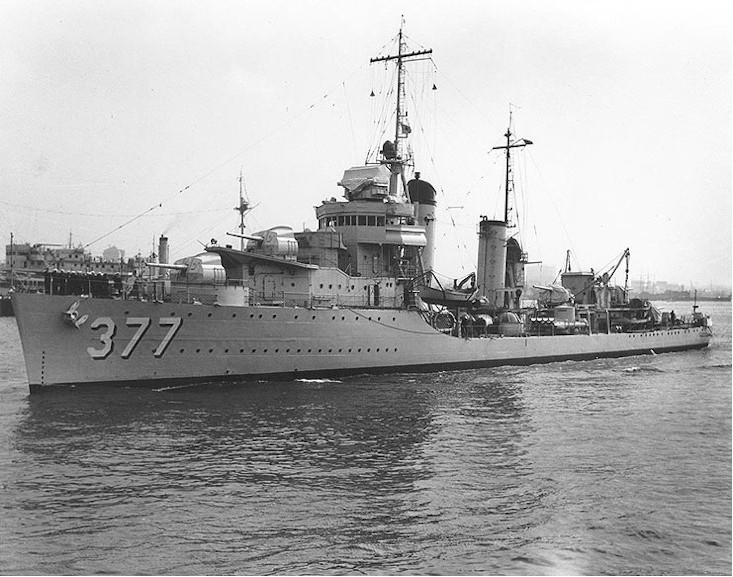

History

United States
- Namesake: George Hamilton Perkins
- Builder: Puget Sound Navy Yard
- Laid down: 15 November 1934
- Launched: 31 December 1935
- Commissioned: 18 September 1936
- Fate: Accidentally rammed and sunk by Australian troopship Duntroon, 29 November 1943

General characteristics
- Class & type: Mahan-class destroyer
- Displacement: 1,500 tons
- Length: 341 ft 4 in (104.04 m)
- Beam: 35 ft (11 m)
- Draft: 9 ft 10 in (3.00 m)
- Speed: 37 kn (69 km/h)
- Complement: 158 officers and crew
- Armament: As Built: 1 × Gun Director above bridge, 5 × 5"(127mm)/38cal DP (5x1), 12 × 21 inch (533 mm) T Tubes (3x4), 4 × .50cal (12.7mm) MG AA (4x1), 2 × Depth Charge stern racks, c1942: 1 × Gun Director above bridge, 4 × 5" (127mm)/38cal DP (4x1), 12 × 21 inch (533 mm) T Tubes (3x4), 6 × Oerlikon 20 mm AA (6x1), 2 × Depth Charge roll-off stern racks, 4 × K-gun depth charge projectors

The second USS Perkins (DD–377) was a Mahan-class destroyer in the United States Navy before and during World War II and named in honour of Commodore George Hamilton Perkins an officer in the United States Navy during the American Civil War.

Perkins was laid down on 15 November 1934 at the Puget Sound Navy Yard, Bremerton, Washington. She was launched 31 December 1935, sponsored by Mrs Larz Anderson, commissioned 18 September 1936.

== Operational history ==
Assigned first to Destroyers, Scouting Force then to Destroyers, Battle Force, Perkins home port was San Diego, California and she operated in the eastern Pacific prior to World War II. At Mare Island Naval Shipyard for overhaul, 7 December 1941, she reported for convoy escort duty on the 15th and on the 17th was en route to Pearl Harbor. By 15 January 1942 she was back at Mare Island for the installation of new radar equipment returning on the 25th to Hawaii.

On 2 February she departed Pearl Harbor with Chicago, for the southwest Pacific. On the 14th she joined Australian, New Zealand and other U.S. ships in the ANZAC Squadron then charged with protecting the eastern approaches to Australia and New Zealand. Through the spring, she continued operations with that squadron, steaming at times with fast carrier forces around the Coral Sea to strike at any enemy encroachments, escorting refuelling units to rendezvous areas and screening larger ships of her own and combined forces as they shelled enemy positions from New Guinea to the Solomon Islands.

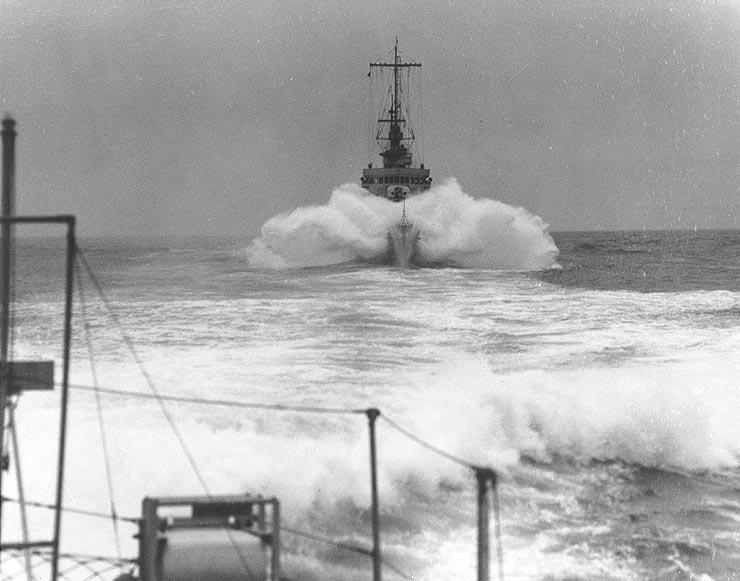
Perkins steaming through heavy seas, 27 August 1937

On 1–2 May, the squadron joined with Task Force (TF) 11 and 17 and screened the carriers as their aircraft struck at Tulagi to open the Battle of the Coral Sea. Detached on the 7th, the squadron steamed to the Louisiade Archipelago to intercept a Japanese amphibious attack on Port Moresby via the Jomard Passage. That afternoon the ships were attacked by land-based aircraft and in driving them off, diverted the Japanese force accomplishing the mission without engaging the enemy and setting the stage for the final action of the Battle of the Coral Sea.

The ANZAC squadron continued to patrol to the southeast of Papua. On the 10th the squadron headed for Australia and for almost two months Perkins escorted convoys and patrolled harbour entrances along the coasts of the Coral and Tasman Seas. Perkins was in Sydney Harbour during the Japanese midget submarine attack of 31 May 1942.

On 11 July she sailed for Auckland, then to Noumea. Convoy escort duty between Suva and New Caledonia followed and in mid-August, she returned to New Zealand for propeller repairs. On the 20th, she sailed for Pearl Harbor where repairs were completed and additional radar equipment and 20 mm guns installed.

In mid-November Perkins headed west, arriving at Espiritu Santo on the 27th. Three days later she departed Segond Channel in Rear Admiral Carleton Wright's cruiser-destroyer force to intercept and destroy Japanese forces attempting to resupply units on Guadalcanal. At 2315, five radar contacts were made and a few minutes later the Battle of Tassafaronga commenced. Perkins launched eight torpedoes, with no hits. Undamaged in the encounter she turned toward Tulagi to assist the burning Pensacola, while Maury went to assist New Orleans. Continuing operations from Tulagi, she shelled the Guadalcanal coast and served on escort assignments until January 1943. A brief availability at Noumea followed and by the 13th she was back at Tulagi for further escort and support missions.

At the end of April Perkins joined TF 10 for tactical training and in May she returned to Australia to join the forces gathering to sail up the New Guinea coast to gain control of the Huon Peninsula. On 21 August Perkins, flagship of DesRon 5, led Smith, Conyngham, and Mahan out of Milne Bay to make a sweep of Huon Gulf and shell Finschhafen.

On 4 September Perkins shelled the coast between the Bulu and Buso rivers, covering Allied landings at Red Beach before heading toward Lae. On the 8th, she fired on the isolated garrison and on the 15th, the last enemy soldiers pulled out and Allied forces entered Lae.

== Fate ==
Finschhafen fell on 2 October and the increase in Allied shipping traffic in Huon Gulf, together with the presence of Japanese submarines, brought Perkins back to escort duty. Reinforcements were escorted to Langemak Bay and to Scarlet Beach east of Satelberg. On 28 November 1943, she departed Milne Bay for Buna, steaming independently. Shortly before 0200, the Australian troopship Duntroon collided with her port side, amidships. Splitting in two, Perkins sank approximately 2 miles off Ipoteto Island. Nine personnel were killed, and a tenth seriously injured. A court of inquiry, held in San Francisco the following month, held the captain of Perkins accountable for the incident, along with his executive officer and officer-of-the-deck.

== Honors ==
Perkins earned 4 battle stars during World War II.
