= Mahlon Tisdale =

Mahlon Street Tisdale
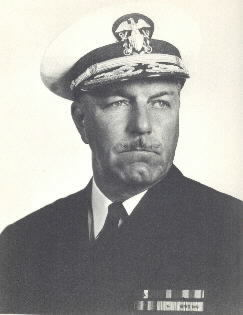
- Born: December 6, 1890; Wenona, Illinois, U.S.
- Died: July 12, 1972 (aged 81); Vallejo, California, U.S.
- Military career
- Allegiance: United States of America
- Branch: United States Navy
- Service years: 1912–1947
- Rank: Vice admiral
- Commands: Commandant of Midshipmen; USS Farenholt
- Conflicts: World War I World War II: Battle of Tassafaronga
- Awards: Navy Cross (2); Distinguished Service Medal

Mahlon Street Tisdale (December 6, 1890 – July 12, 1972) was an officer of the United States Navy. He was awarded two Navy Crosses, one for staff service in World War I, and another during the Battle of Tassafaronga in World War II.

== Early life and education ==
Tisdale was born on December 6, 1890, in Wenona, Illinois. He was appointed to the United States Naval Academy in 1908 and graduated with a commission as an ensign in the United States Navy on 7 June 1912. His Naval Academy classmates included future Admirals Daniel E. Barbey, Elliot Buckmaster, Louis E. Denfield, Charles A. Lockwood, Charles P. Mason, Alfred E. Montgomery, DeWitt C. Ramsey, Louis Wenzell, and Carleton F. Wright. Before World War I, Tisdale served aboard cruisers USS North Dakota and USS Salem. Aboard USS Salem, Tisdale participated in the Veracruz Expedition in 1914.

When United States entered the World War I, Tisdale was appointed an Aide and Flag secretary on the staff of Commander Patrol Force, Atlantic Fleet and later served on USS Birmingham, as Aide on the staff of Vice Admiral Henry Braid Wilson Commander of U.S. Naval Forces in France. For this service, Tisdale received a Navy Cross.

After return to the United States in January 1919, Tisdale served as executive officer on USS Hart. He stayed in this capacity until March 1920, when he was transferred to USS Ludlow. In January 1921, he was transfer to the staff of the Commander, Battleship Division Six, Pacific Fleet, where he served aboard USS Wyoming as division radio officer.

In June 1921, Tisdale was transferred to the Naval Academy, where he became an aide to the Superintendent of USNA. Subsequently, Tisdale received his first command, when he served as commander of the USS Farenholt from October 23, 1926, until June 1928.

== Career ==
Tisdale's career including surface command (USS Farenholt), USS Chester, various staff positions, and Commander, Destroyers, Pacific Fleet (ComDesPac) during World War II. He was also Commandant of Midshipmen at the United States Naval Academy at the start of World War II. After his superior's ship was put out of action during the Battle of Tassafaronga, he assumed command of the task force, continuing the battle from the USS Honolulu. For his actions, Tisdale was awarded a star to his existing Navy Cross.

== Awards and decorations ==

1st Row	Navy Cross with Gold star		Navy Distinguished Service Medal
2nd Row	Legion of Merit with two Gold stars and "V" Device	Navy Unit Commendation	Mexican Service Medal
3rd Row	World War I Victory Medal with Escort Clasp	American Defense Service Medal with Fleet Clasp	American Campaign Medal
4th Row	Asiatic-Pacific Campaign Medal with six service stars	World War II Victory Medal	Philippine Liberation Medal with two bronze stars

== Legacy ==
The Oliver Hazard Perry class guided missile frigate USS Mahlon S. Tisdale (FFG-27) was named in his honor.
