= DeWitt Clinton Ramsey =

American admiral (1888–1961)

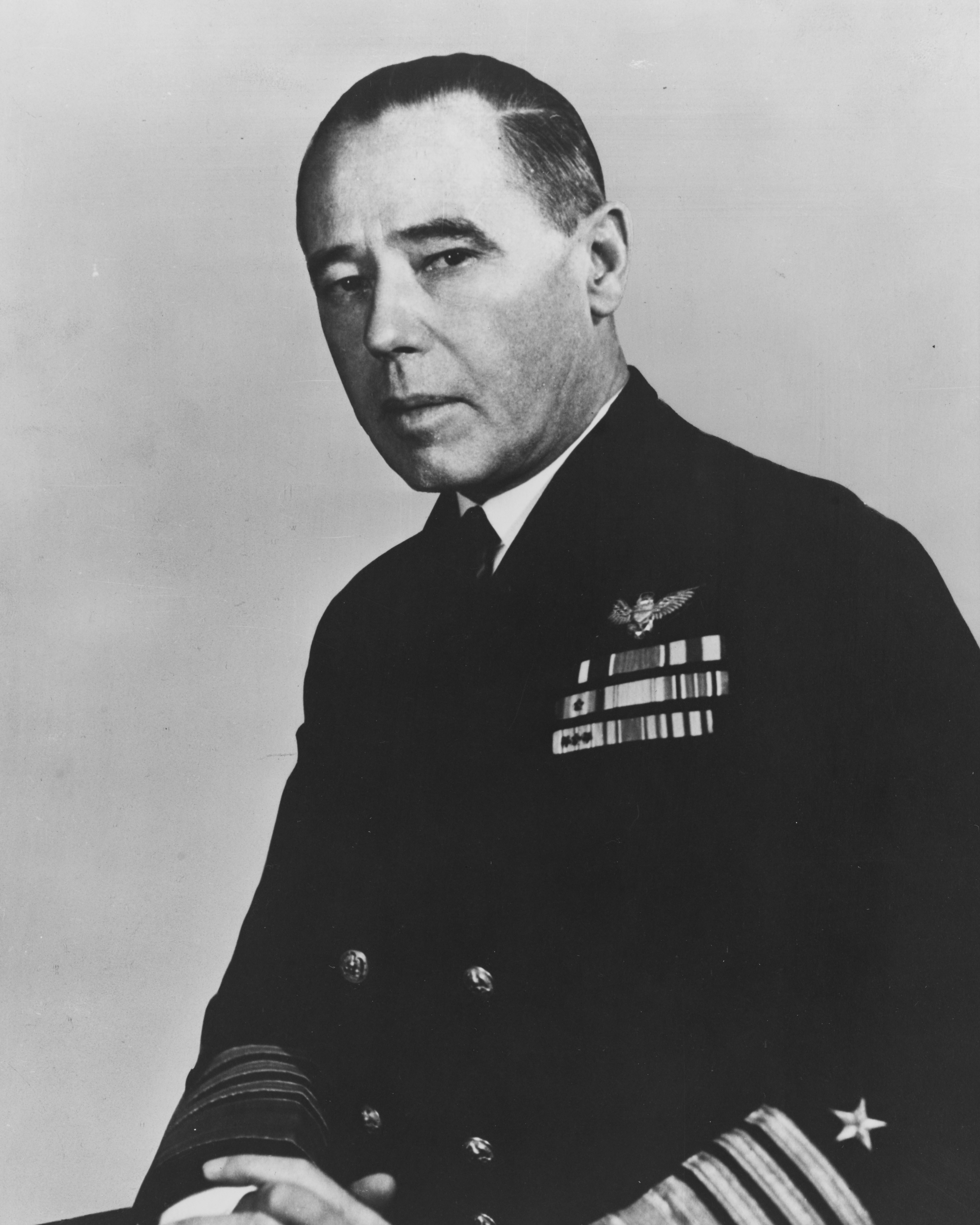
- Admiral DeWitt Clinton Ramsey
- Born: October 2, 1888; Fort Whipple, Arizona, U.S.
- Died: September 7, 1961 (aged 72); Philadelphia, Pennsylvania, U.S.
- Burial place: United States Naval Academy Cemetery, Annapolis, Maryland.
- Relatives: Anne Ramsey (Niece)
- Military career
- Branch: United States Navy
- Service years: 1912–1949
- Rank: Admiral
- Commands: Pacific Fleet
- Conflicts: World War I World War II
- Awards: Navy Cross; Distinguished Service Medal (2); Legion of Merit

Admiral DeWitt Clinton Ramsey (2 October 1888 – 7 September 1961) was a U.S. Navy officer and pioneer naval aviator who served as an aircraft carrier commander during World War II. His postwar assignments included command of the U.S. Pacific Fleet and service as Chief of the Bureau of Aeronautics (BuAer) in the Navy Department and as Vice Chief of Naval Operations.

== Biography ==
Ramsey was born on October 2, 1888, at Whipple Barracks, near Prescott, Arizona, to Frank DeWitt Ramsey and Lillian Carlotta Zulick. He was the grandson of Arizona Territorial Governor C. Meyer Zulick. Upon graduation from the U.S. Naval Academy, Ramsey was commissioned an Ensign in June 1912. His Naval Academy classmates included future Admirals Daniel E. Barbey, Elliot Buckmaster, Louis E. Denfield, Charles A. Lockwood, Charles P. Mason, Alfred E. Montgomery, Mahlon Tisdale, Louis Wenzell, and Carleton F. Wright. He took Juanita as his wife. In 1917 he qualified as a naval aviator. During World War I, he was Inspection Officer for United States Naval Air Stations in France, and a member of the Inter-Allied Naval Armistice Commission.

During the interwar period, Ramsey served as a naval aviator on various naval staffs and ships. Reporting on board the aircraft carrier USS Saratoga (CV-3) in 1938, he was her executive officer into 1939. Later that year, he headed BuAer's Plans Division, and in 1941 became Assistant Chief of BuAer.

During World War II, he commanded the Saratoga from May through September 1942, covering the landings on Guadalcanal, Solomon Islands, on 7 August, and participating in the Battle of the Eastern Solomons later in the month. For his skillful use of airpower against Japanese naval forces in the Solomons, he was awarded the Navy Cross.

Promoted to Rear Admiral on September 27, 1942, he yielded command of Saratoga over to Capt. Gerald Bogan, and then rode the ship (damaged during the Eastern Solomons battle) back to Pearl Harbor for repairs. In the Saratoga, he next commanded a task force that included a British carrier, HMS Victorious (R38).

Ramsey received the Navy Distinguished Service Medal as Chief of the U.S. Navy Bureau of Aeronautics (BuAer) from August 6, 1943, to June 1, 1945, and a Gold Star as Vice Chief of Naval Operations from January 15, 1946, to January 3, 1948.

After commanding the Pacific Fleet, he served as Commissioner of Trust Territory of the Pacific Islands, until retiring on 1 May 1949.

Admiral Ramsey died 7 September 1961, at Naval Hospital Philadelphia at the age of 72.

== Navy Cross citation ==

DeWitt Clinton Ramsey

Service: Navy
Division: U.S.S. Saratoga (CV-3)
Place and date: Guadalcanal-Tulagi, 24 August 1942
GENERAL ORDERS: Board Serial 3954 (October 30, 1942)

Citation:

The President of the United States of America takes pleasure in presenting the Navy Cross to Captain DeWitt Clinton Ramsey (NSN: 0-7813), United States Navy, for extraordinary heroism and distinguished service in the line of his profession as Commanding Officer of the Aircraft Carrier U.S.S. SARATOGA (CV-3), during the occupation of Guadalcanal-Tulagi and the Battle of the Solomons, 24 August 1942. The air groups under Captain Ramsey's command successfully attacked and damaged ships of two Japanese Task Forces during this action. By his leadership and effective control of the air squadrons attached to his command, he contributed most effectively to the success of this engagement. His outstanding performance of duty was at all times an inspiration to those who served under him and was in keeping with the highest traditions of the United States Naval Service.

Military offices
Preceded by Louis E. Denfeld	Commander in Chief of the United States Pacific Fleet; 1948-1949	Succeeded by Arthur W. Radford
