= Louis E. Denfeld =

United States Navy admiral (1891–1972)

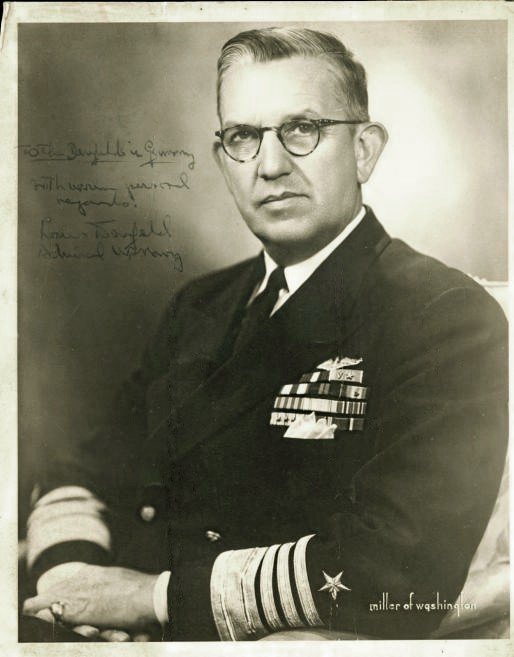
- Born: April 13, 1891; Westborough, Massachusetts, U.S.
- Died: March 28, 1972 (aged 80); Westborough, Massachusetts, U.S.
- Burial place: Arlington National Cemetery
- Military career
- Branch: United States Navy
- Service years: 1912–1950
- Rank: Admiral
- Commands: Chief of Naval Operations; United States Pacific Command; United States Pacific Fleet; Battleship Division 9 Destroyer Squadron 1 Destroyer Division 18; Destroyer Division 11; USS McCall
- Conflicts: World War I World War II
- Awards: Navy Distinguished Service Medal; Legion of Merit (3)

Louis Emil Denfeld (April 13, 1891 – March 28, 1972) was an admiral in the United States Navy who served as Chief of Naval Operations from December 15, 1947, to November 1, 1949. He also held several significant surface commands during World War II, and after the war he served as the dual-hatted commander of United States Pacific Command and Pacific Fleet.

== Life and naval career ==
Born in Westborough, Massachusetts, Denfeld graduated from the United States Naval Academy in 1912. His Naval Academy classmates included future admirals Daniel E. Barbey, Elliot Buckmaster, Charles A. Lockwood, Charles P. Mason, Alfred E. Montgomery, DeWitt C. Ramsey, Mahlon Tisdale, Louis Wenzell, and Carleton F. Wright. He took command of the destroyer USS McCall in 1919 and served aboard the submarine USS S-24 during 1923 and 1924. He commanded Destroyer Division 11 from 1935 to 1937.

Denfeld was selected to be aide to the Chief of Naval Operations in 1939, then commanded first Destroyer Division 18, then Destroyer Squadron 1 from 1939 to 1941. He served as Chief of Staff to the Commander of the United States Atlantic Fleet, Admiral Royal E. Ingersoll. For planning of safe routes for escort convoys in this capacity, Denfeld received the Legion of Merit. He became head of the Atlantic Fleet Support Force in 1941, then assistant chief to the Bureau of Navigation in 1942. He led Battleship Division 9 in 1945, was appointed Chief of the Bureau of Personnel in 1945, and commanded United States Pacific Command and Pacific Fleet in 1947.

On February 28, 1947 Denfeld was named Military Governor of the Marshall Islands, Caroline Islands, and Mariana Islands, replacing Admiral John H. Towers. Denfeld was appointed Chief of Naval Operations on December 15, 1947.

Due to his role in the "Revolt of the Admirals", he was detached from duty by the Secretary of the Navy Francis P. Matthews on November 1, 1949, and retired in 1950.

Denfeld was a candidate for Governor of Massachusetts in 1950. He lost the Republican nomination to Arthur W. Coolidge. Denfield died in Westborough, Massachusetts at the age of 80. He is buried at Arlington National Cemetery. Denfeld Drive in Westborough, Massachusetts and Denfeld Avenue in Kensington, Maryland, is named for him.

== Awards and decorations ==
Admiral Louis E. Denfeld received many decorations during his career. Here is his ribbon bar:

Submarine Warfare insignia
1st Row	Navy Distinguished Service Medal		Legion of Merit with two gold award stars and "V" Device
2nd Row	Mexican Service Medal	Haitian Campaign Medal	World War I Victory Medal with Battle clasp
3rd Row	Second Nicaraguan Campaign Medal	American Defense Service Medal	American Campaign Medal
4th Row	Asiatic-Pacific Campaign Medal with three service stars	World War II Victory Medal	Philippine Liberation Medal

Military offices
Preceded by John H. Towers	Commander in Chief United States Pacific Fleet; 1947	Succeeded by DeWitt C. Ramsey
Preceded by Chester W. Nimitz	Chief of Naval Operations; 1947–1949	Succeeded by Forrest P. Sherman
