= Carleton H. Wright =

United States Navy officer (1892–1973)

Carleton Herbert Wright
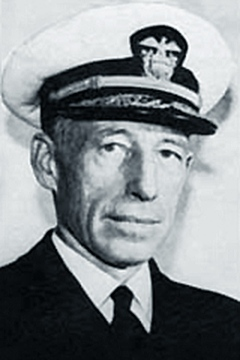
- Born: June 2, 1892; New Hampton, Iowa, U.S.
- Died: June 27, 1973 (aged 81); Claremont, California, U.S.
- Military career
- Allegiance: United States of America
- Branch: United States Navy
- Service years: 1912–1948
- Rank: Rear Admiral
- Nickname: Bosco
- Commands: Task Force 67; Cruiser Division 4; 12th Naval District
- Conflicts: World War I: North Sea Mine Barrage; World War II: Guadalcanal campaign; Battle of Tassafaronga
- Awards: Navy Cross

Carleton Herbert Wright (June 2, 1892 – June 27, 1973) was a rear admiral in the United States Navy (USN).

== Early career ==
Wright graduated from the United States Naval Academy in 1912 with a class standing of 16th out of 156 graduates. His Naval Academy classmates included future Admirals Daniel E. Barbey, Elliot Buckmaster, Louis E. Denfield, Charles A. Lockwood, Charles P. Mason, Alfred E. Montgomery, DeWitt C. Ramsey, Mahlon Tisdale, and Louis Wenzell. During World War I, he served aboard the Jarvis at Queenstown, then had duty assembling mines for the North Sea Mine Barrage.

After World War I, Wright attended the USN's ordnance postgraduate course from 1918 through 1920. He then had various ship and staff assignments afloat and ordnance-related posts ashore until 1935. From 1935 to 1936, he commanded Destroyer Division 18. From 1936 to 1938 he served on the staff of Comsofor, and then at the Naval Mine Depot at Yorktown until 1941.

== World War II ==
At the outbreak of World War II, Wright was the captain of the U.S. cruiser Augusta. Wright was promoted to rear admiral in May 1942 and commanded warship forces under William Halsey during the Guadalcanal campaign. As commander of Task Force 67, Wright led his force of five cruisers and four destroyers against a Japanese "Tokyo Express" force of eight destroyers on the night of November 30, 1942. In the resulting Battle of Tassafaronga, Wright's force sank one Japanese destroyer, but one of Wright's cruisers, the Northampton, was sunk and three other cruisers were so badly damaged that they were out of action for nine months. The battle was one of the worst defeats that the U.S. Navy suffered in World War II. Wright was awarded the Navy Cross for his performance in the battle, but was also reassigned to shore duty at the U.S. Navy's staff in Washington, D.C.

Wright later commanded the U.S. Navy's Cruiser Division 4 in the central Pacific in 1944 before returning to shore duty as a member of the staff and later commander of the 12th Naval District in San Francisco. On July 17, 1944, the Port Chicago disaster—two explosions in which 302 men were killed and two ships obliterated, thought to be caused by mishandling of ammunition by untrained shiploaders—occurred under his command. Afterward Wright ordered the General Courts Martial of 50 African-American men found guilty of mutiny after expressing fear and refusing to return to work loading ammunition.

== Post war ==
In March 1946, Wright became the Inspector General of the Pacific Fleet and Pacific Ocean Area. He later served as the deputy commander of the Marianas before retiring from the U.S. Navy in October 1948. He died in Claremont, California, on June 27, 1973.
