= USS Lamson (DD-367) =

Mahan-class destroyer

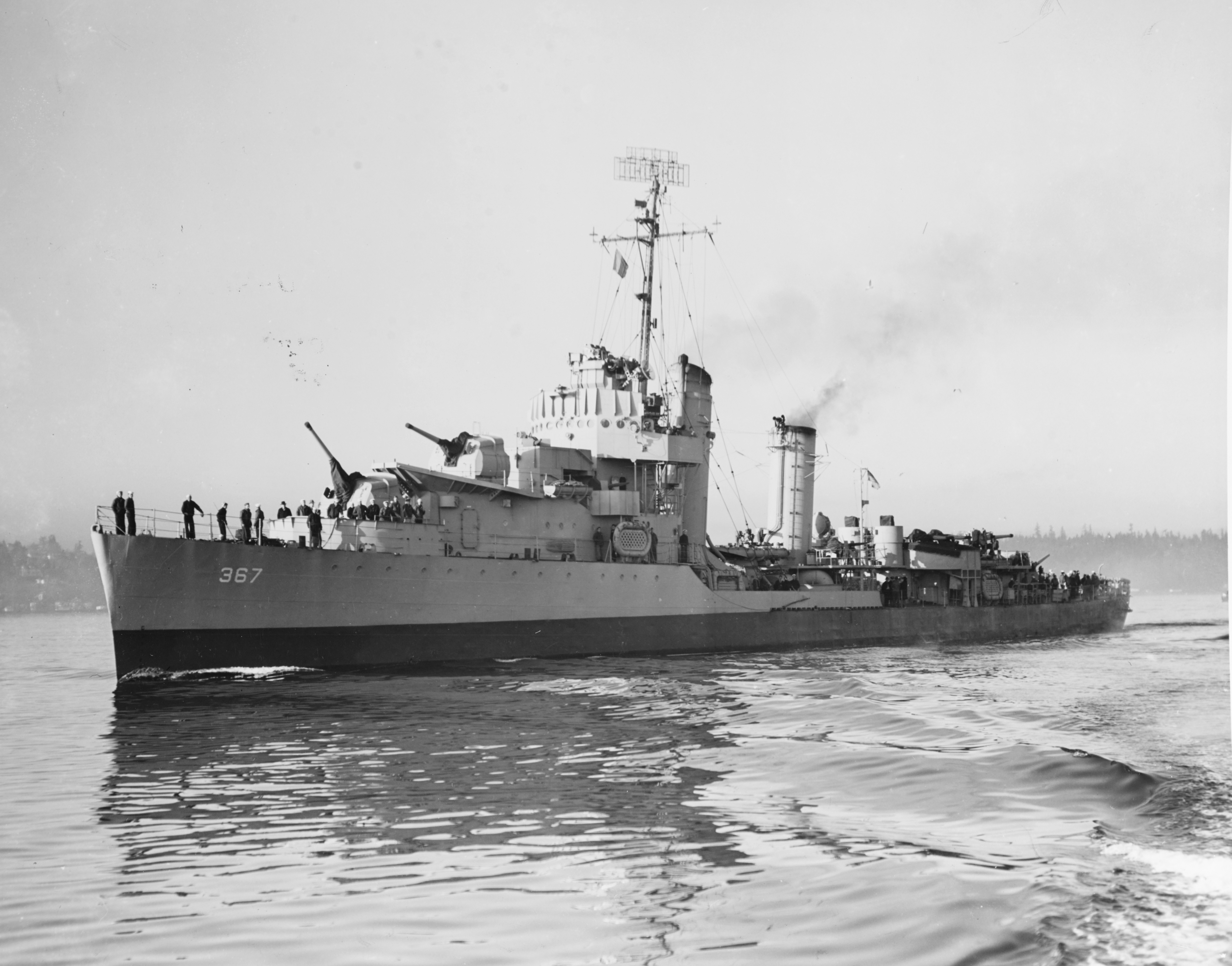
- USS Lamson (DD-367)

History

United States
- Name: Lamson
- Namesake: Roswell Hawkes Lamson
- Builder: Bath Iron Works
- Laid down: 20 March 1934
- Launched: 17 June 1936
- Commissioned: 21 October 1936
- Stricken: 15 August 1946
- Fate: Sunk on 2 July 1946 during Operation Crossroads

General characteristics
- Class & type: Mahan class destroyer
- Displacement: 1,500 tons
- Length: 341 ft 4 in (104.04 m)
- Beam: 34 ft 8 in(10.57 m)
- Draft: 9 ft 1 in (2.77 m)
- Speed: 36.5 knots (68 km/h)
- Complement: 158 officers and crew
- Armament: As Built: 1 × Gun director above bridge, 5 × 5"(127mm)/38cal DP (5x1), 12 × 21 inch (533 mm) T Tubes (3x4), 4 × .50cal (12.7mm) MG AA (4x1), 2 × Depth Charge stern racks, c1944: 1 × Mk33 Gun Fire Control System, 4 × 5" (127mm)/38cal DP (4x1), 12 × 21 inch (533 mm) T Tubes (3x4), 2 × Mk51 Gun Directors, 4 × Bofors 40 mm AA (2x2), 6 × Oerlikon 20 mm AA (6x1), 2 × Depth Charge roll-off stern racks, 4 × K-gun depth charge projectors

The third USS Lamson (DD-367) was a Mahan-class destroyer of the United States Navy; named for Roswell Hawkes Lamson. She served in the Pacific during World War II. Lamson participated in the Battle of Tassafaronga, and remained undamaged until hit by a Japanese kamikaze during the recapture of the Philippines. Lamson was sunk during the Operation Crossroads atomic weapons tests at Bikini Atoll in 1946.

== History ==
Lamson was laid down 20 March 1934 by Bath Iron Works Corp., Bath, Maine; launched 17 June 1936; sponsored by Miss Francis W. Andrews; and commissioned 21 October 1936.

After shakedown in the Atlantic and Caribbean, Lamson departed Norfolk, Virginia 16 June 1937 for the Pacific. Arriving San Diego, California, 1 July, the destroyer performed exercises and tactical training operations until she sailed for Pearl Harbor 5 October 1939. Lamson continued training operations from her Hawaiian base for the next 2 years.

She was returning to Pearl Harbor from patrol duty during the Japanese attack 7 December 1941. After a search for the Japanese task force, the destroyer patrolled Hawaiian waters and steamed to Johnston Island to rescue civilians. Departing Pearl Harbor 6 January 1942, Lamson arrived Pago Pago, Samoa, 2 weeks later for ASW patrols, then was assigned to the ANZAC Squadron in the South Pacific.

During early March she arrived in the Fiji Islands to join the expanded ASW screen which was formed to keep the South Pacific supply lines open. After 6 months of patrol and screening operations, Lamson saw action 22 October when, with Mahan, she attacked Japanese picket boats stationed between Gilbert and Ellice Islands. The two destroyers made a coordinated attack beating off enemy air raids and sank two enemy craft.

On 30 November, Lamson joined Rear Admiral Wright's Task Force 67 during the Battle of Tassafaronga. One Japanese destroyer was sunk and one damaged while the American force lost one cruiser and three damaged. Lamson returned to operate in the South Pacific for the next 8 months, screening convoys en route to Guadalcanal. Constantly at sea on patrol and ASW screen, the destroyer assisted other units as they paved the way for the Allied advance across the Pacific.

Arriving Milne Bay 19 August 1943, Lamson joined Destroyer Squadron 5, the forerunner of the mighty 7th Fleet, to engage in the New Guinea operations. In the landings at Lae and Finschhafen during September, she joined in the preinvasion bombardment, gave fire support after the landings, and escorted to the island reinforcement convoys needed to spearhead the drive toward Japan.

After 2 months of escort duty, Lamson joined three other destroyers 29 November and penetrated 160 miles into enemy territory to bombard Madang, the main Japanese naval base on New Guinea. On 15 December she engaged in preinvasion bombardment of Arawe, New Britain, and, during the landings at Cape Gloucester 11 days later, downed two "Vals". Continuing the New Guinea operation, the destroyer bombarded Saidor 2 January 1944.

After a brief overhaul at Mare Island and training at Pearl Harbor, Lamson arrived at Eniwetok 8 August to join the 5th Fleet. For the next 2 months she engaged in patrol duty and ASW screen in the Marshall Islands before reassignment to the 7th Fleet.

Departing Hollandia 25 October, Lamson steamed to the Philippines to serve as picket, patrol and screening ship for the massive Leyte assault. Throughout November the destroyer beat off numerous suicide plane attacks aimed at convoys bringing supplies to the Philippines. According to the ships action report, while screening a convoy off Ormoc Bay on 7 December 1944, Lamson downed two "Dinahs" before a "Tony" made a fast low approach on the starboard quarter and struck the ships number two stack with its right wing and spun around crashing into the after port corner of the transmission room. Four men were killed and seventeen wounded.

She arrived at the Puget Sound Navy Yard 16 January 1945 for extensive repairs. Returning Eniwetok 10 May, Lamson operated for the rest of the war on patrol and air-sea rescue work off Iwo Jima. A fitting climax to Lamson's fine war record came on 3 September, when she arrived at Chichi Jima to supervise the surrender of the Bonin Islands. Following occupation duty at Sasebo, Japan for 1 month, the destroyer departed Japan 29 October for San Diego, arriving there 29 November.

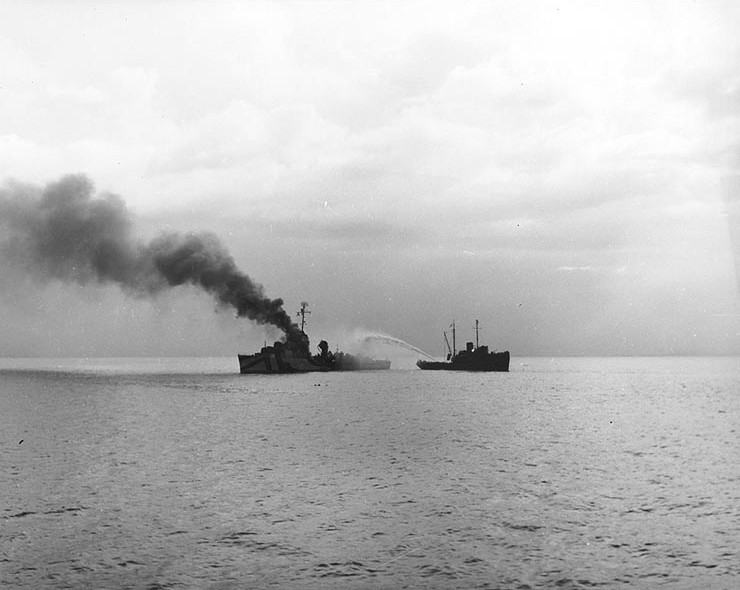
USS Lamson on fire in Ormoc Bay on 1944-12-07, after she was hit by a kamikaze. The tug assisting with firefighting is probably USS ATR-31.

== Fate ==
However, Lamson was still destined to play a valuable role in America's progress as she arrived at Bikini Atoll later in May 1946 to participate in Operation Crossroads. The destroyer was sunk in Test Able, the atomic explosion 2 July 1946.

== Honors and awards ==
- Asiatic-Pacific Campaign Medal with five battle stars
- World War II Victory Medal
- Navy Occupation Service Medal with Asia Clasp
