= USS Mahan (DD-364) =

Lead ship of Mahan-class

Coordinates: 10°50′N 124°30′E

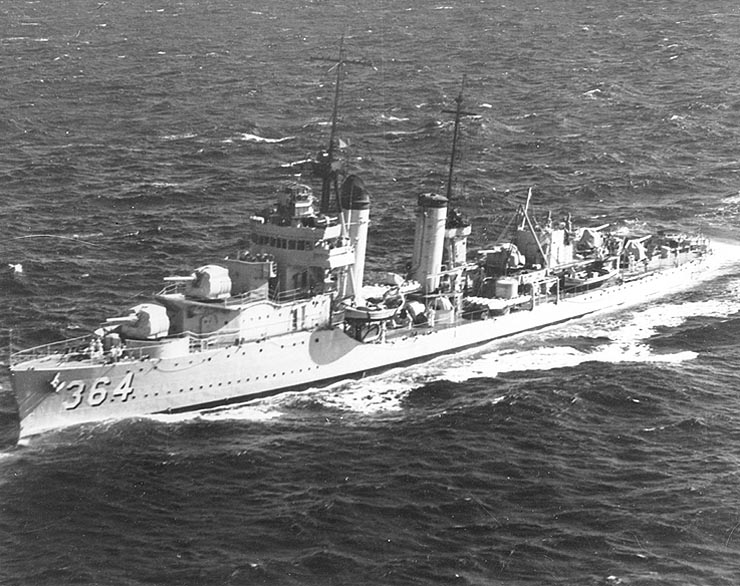
- Mahan at sea c. 1938

History

United States
- Name: USS Mahan
- Namesake: Alfred Thayer Mahan
- Builder: United Dry Docks Inc., Staten Island, New York
- Laid down: 12 June 1934
- Launched: 15 October 1935
- Commissioned: 18 September 1936
- Identification: DD-364
- Fate: Disabled by Japanese kamikaze; sunk by US destroyer on 7 December 1944.

General characteristics
- Class & type: Mahan-class destroyer
- Displacement: 1,500 long tons (1,524 t) (standard); 1,725 long tons (1,753 t) (deep load)
- Length: 341.3 ft (104.0 m)
- Beam: 35.6 ft (10.9 m)
- Draft: 10 feet 7 inches (3.2 m)
- Installed power: 46,000 shp (34,000 kW); 4 Babcock & Wilcox or Foster Wheeler boilers
- Propulsion: 2 General Electric steam turbines
- Speed: 37 kn (69 km/h; 43 mph)
- Range: 6,940 nmi (12,850 km; 7,990 mi) at 12 knots (22 km/h; 14 mph)
- Complement: 158 officers and enlisted men
- Armament: (as built); 5 × 5 inch (127mm)/38cal DP (5×1), 12 × 21 inch (533 mm) torpedo tubes (3×4), 4 × .50 cal (12.7mm) Machine guns (4×1), 2 × depth charge stern racks; (1942); 4 × 5 inch (127mm)/38cal DP (4x1), 12 × 21 inch (533mm) torpedo tubes (3x4), 2 × Bofors 40 mm guns (2x2), 5 × 20 mm Oerlikon cannons (5x1), 2 × depth charge stern racks

USS Mahan (DD-364) was the lead ship of the United States Navy's Mahan-class destroyers. The ship was named for Rear Admiral Alfred Thayer Mahan, a 19th-century naval historian and strategic theorist. Her design ushered in major advances over traditional destroyers. Among them were a third set of quadruple torpedo tubes, protective gun shelters, and emergency diesel generators, along with a steam propulsion system that was simpler and more efficient to operate.

Mahan began her service in 1936. She was first assigned to the US Atlantic Fleet and then transferred to Pearl Harbor in 1937. When the Japanese attacked Pearl Harbor on 7 December 1941, Mahan was at sea with Task Force 12. The task force's mission to Midway Island was aborted to participate in the post-attack search for the enemy strike force. Unable to locate it, the task force returned to Pearl Harbor.

Early in World War II, Mahan took part in raids on the Marshall and Gilbert Islands. In the Battle of the Santa Cruz Islands, Admirals Chester Nimitz and William Halsey commended the destroyer group (of which Mahan was a member) for a stellar effort in screening the aircraft carriers Hornet and Enterprise against heavy odds. During the New Guinea campaign to take the northeast coast from the Japanese, Mahan was engaged in the amphibious landings at Salamaua, Lae, and Finschhafen. She participated in landings at Arawe and Borgen Bay (near Cape Gloucester), New Britain, and provided support for the troop landing at Los Negros Island in the Admiralty Islands.

Late in the Pacific War, the Japanese kamikaze relentlessly plagued US Naval operations. On 7 December 1944, a group of suicide aircraft overwhelmed and disabled Mahan at Ormoc Bay, Leyte, in the Philippine Islands. On fire and exploding, the ship was abandoned and US destroyer Walke sank her with torpedoes and gunfire.

== Characteristics ==
Mahan displaced 1,500 long tons (1,524 t) at the standard load and 1,725 long tons (1,753 t) at the deep load. The ship's overall length was 341 feet 3 inches (104.0 m), the beam was 35 feet 6 inches (10.8 m) and her draft was 10 feet 7 inches (3.2 m). She was powered by two of General Electric's geared steam turbines, which developed a total of 46,000 shaft horsepower (34,000 kW) for a maximum speed of 37 knots (69 km/h; 43 mph). Four Babcock & Wilcox or four Foster Wheeler water-tube boilers generated the superheated steam needed for the turbines. Mahan carried a maximum of 523 long tons (531 t) of fuel oil, with a range of 6,940 nautical miles (12,850 km; 7,990 mi) at 12 knots (22 km/h; 14 mph). Her peacetime complement was 158 officers and enlisted men. The wartime complement increased to approximately 250 officers and enlisted men.

Mahan had a tripod foremast and a pole mainmast. To improve the anti-aircraft field of fire, the tripod foremast was constructed without nautical rigging. In silhouette, the ship was similar to the larger Porter class that immediately preceded her. She was fitted with the first emergency diesel generators, replacing the storage batteries of earlier destroyers. Gun crew shelters were built fore and aft for the superimposed weapons. A third quadruple set of torpedo tubes was added, with one mount on the centerline and two in the side positions. This required relocating one 5 inch/38 caliber gun to the aft deckhouse. Mahan incorporated a new generation of land-based steam propulsion machinery. With boiler pressures increasing to 600 PSI (pounds per square inch), and high-pressure turbines that had double reduction gears, which ran faster and more efficiently than that of her predecessors.

== Armament ==
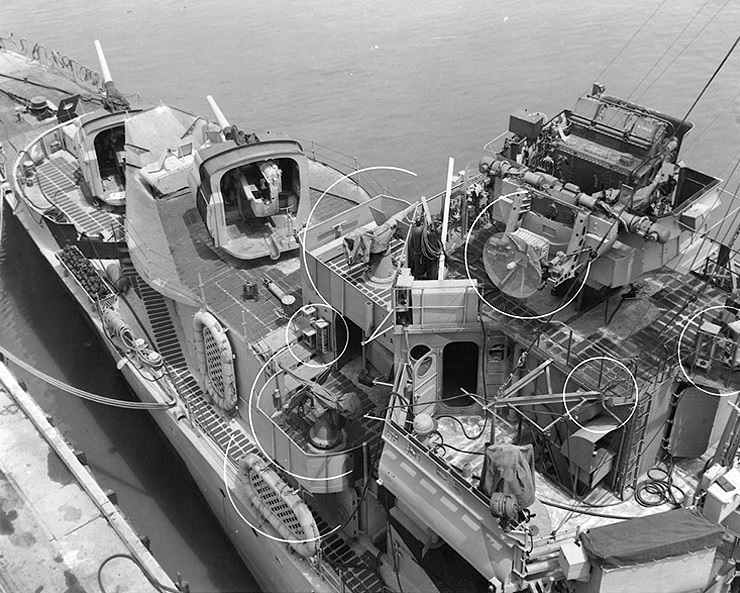
Mahan undergoing overhaul at the Mare Island Naval Shipyard on 24 June 1944, with her forward 5 inch/38 caliber guns in full view.

The main battery of Mahan consisted of five 5 inch/38 caliber guns, later four in 1942, equipped with the Mark 33 ship gun fire-control system. Each gun was dual-purpose, configured for surface and aerial targets. Her anti-aircraft battery originally had four water-cooled .50 caliber machine guns. The ship was fitted with three quadruple torpedo-tube mounts for twelve 21 inch (533 mm) torpedoes, guided by the Mark 27 torpedo fire-control system. Depth charge roll-off racks were rigged on the stern of the ship.

In early 1942, the Mahan-class destroyers began a wartime armament refitting process, but most of the class was not fully refitted until 1944. Mahan was refitted in June 1944 at the Mare Island Naval Shipyard. The notable refits to the Mahan-class included the removal of one 5 inch/38 gun, typically replaced with two twin Bofors 40 mm guns and five 20 mm Oerlikon guns.

== Construction and service ==
Mahan was built by United Dry Docks (successor to the Morse Dry Dock and Repair Company) in Staten Island, New York. Her keel was laid down on 12 June 1934 and she was launched on 15 October 1935, sponsored by Kathleen H. Mahan (the admiral's great-granddaughter). The ship was commissioned on 18 September 1936. The ship departed for Caribbean and South American ports within two months of her commission, combining her initial training and shakedown cruise with a goodwill tour. She remained in the Atlantic until July 1937, then headed to the Southern California coast for fleet training before steaming to her new station at Pearl Harbor.

Rising tension between Japan and the United States stretched back to 1931 with Japan's invasion of Manchuria in the Mukden Incident. Japan's continued aggression, instigating the Second Sino-Japanese War in 1937 and invading French Indochina in 1940—to which the United States and European powers responded with embargoes on iron and oil imports—further heightened the tension. The Japanese thereafter decided to attack the Western powers in Asia, beginning with a surprise attack on the American naval base at Pearl Harbor. When the Japanese struck Pearl Harbor on 7 December 1941, Mahan was at sea with the aircraft carrier Lexington, three cruisers and four destroyers as part of Task Force 12. Lexington's mission was to ferry Marine aircraft to reinforce Midway Island. After news of the attack on Pearl Harbor, the task-force commander received orders to terminate the ferry mission and to search for the Japanese strike force. Unable to locate them, the task force returned to Pearl Harbor on 12 December.

She put to sea in late December with 103 Marines to reinforce their detachment at Johnston Island (about 750 nautical miles—860 miles, or 1,390 km—west of Hawaii), and evacuated 47 civilians to Hawaii the following month. A convoy assignment took Mahan to Samoa, where she joined Task Force 17 (including the carrier Yorktown, two cruisers and five destroyers). The task force carried out raids on Jaluit Atoll, Mili Atoll and Makin Atoll (Butaritari) in the Marshall Islands and Gilbert Islands. Mahan moved on to Canton Island in late February 1942, temporarily assigned to offshore patrol duty. By early April, she was at sea with a convoy bound for San Pedro, California. The ship then steamed north to the Mare Island Naval Shipyard for overhaul, docking on 18 April 1942.

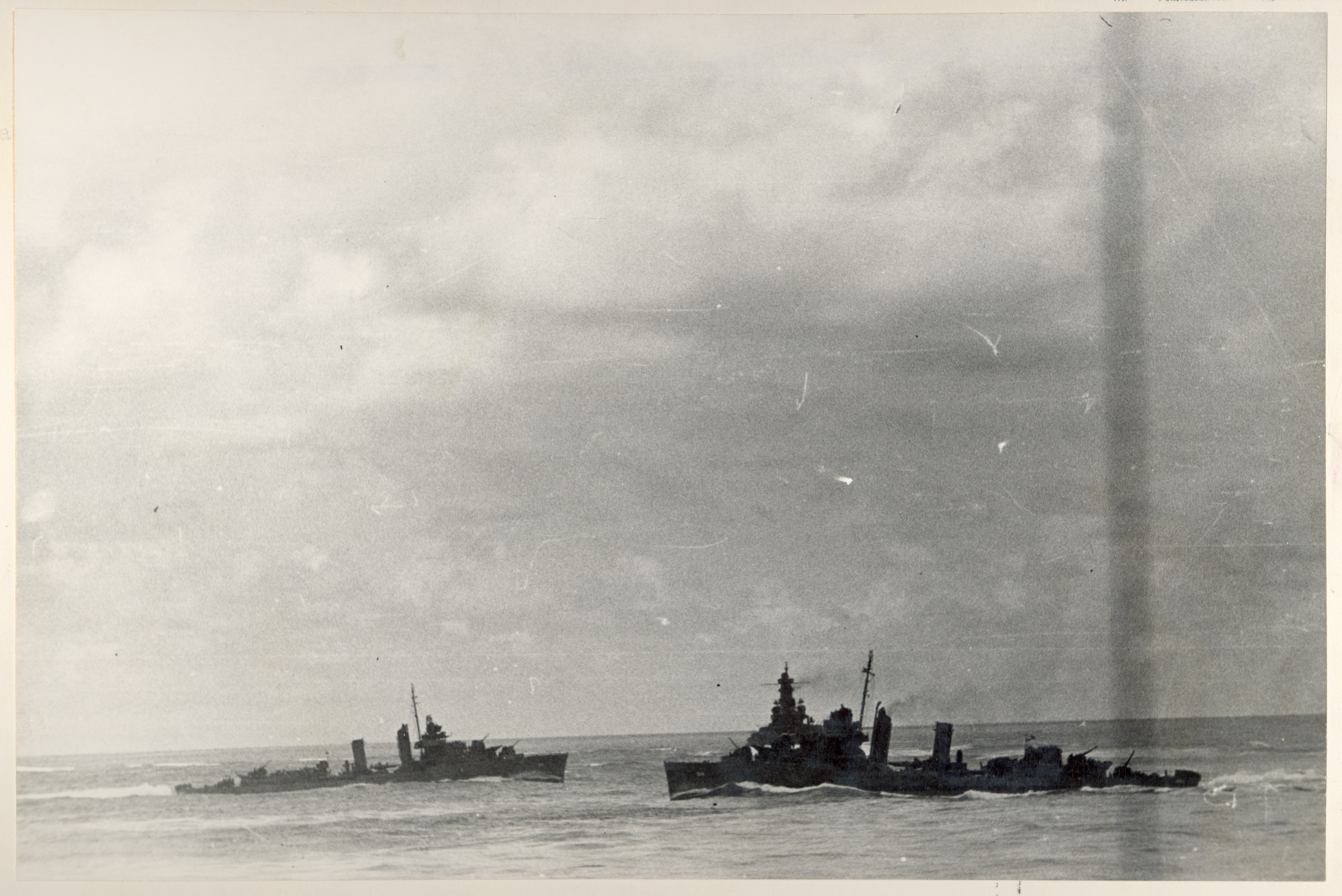
Mahan (foreground) maneuvering during the Battle of the Santa Cruz Islands

Mahan was back operating in the waters off Pearl Harbor in August 1942. By mid-October, she had steamed out of Pearl Harbor as part of Task Force 16 with the carrier Enterprise, the battleship South Dakota, two cruisers and seven destroyers. On 24 October they joined Task Force 17, which included the carrier Hornet, four cruisers and six destroyers. The two carrier groups formed Task Force 61 under the command of Rear Admiral Thomas C. Kinkaid, and was ordered to the Santa Cruz Islands to strike the Japanese if they moved on Guadalcanal.

After the task force anchored off the islands on the morning of 26 October, Enterprise's search planes spotted the enemy carrier force and dropped two 500-pound bombs on the Japanese aircraft carrier Zuiho, setting the Battle of the Santa Cruz Islands in motion. When it subsided, the Navy had lost 74 aircraft, the carrier Hornet and one destroyer; Enterprise, South Dakota, one cruiser and one destroyer were damaged. The Japanese lost about 100 aircraft, but their ship casualties were much lower. Nimitz and Halsey expressed their satisfaction with Kinkaid's force and their battle against heavy odds, and the destroyers in the Hornet and Enterprise screens were commended for a stellar effort.

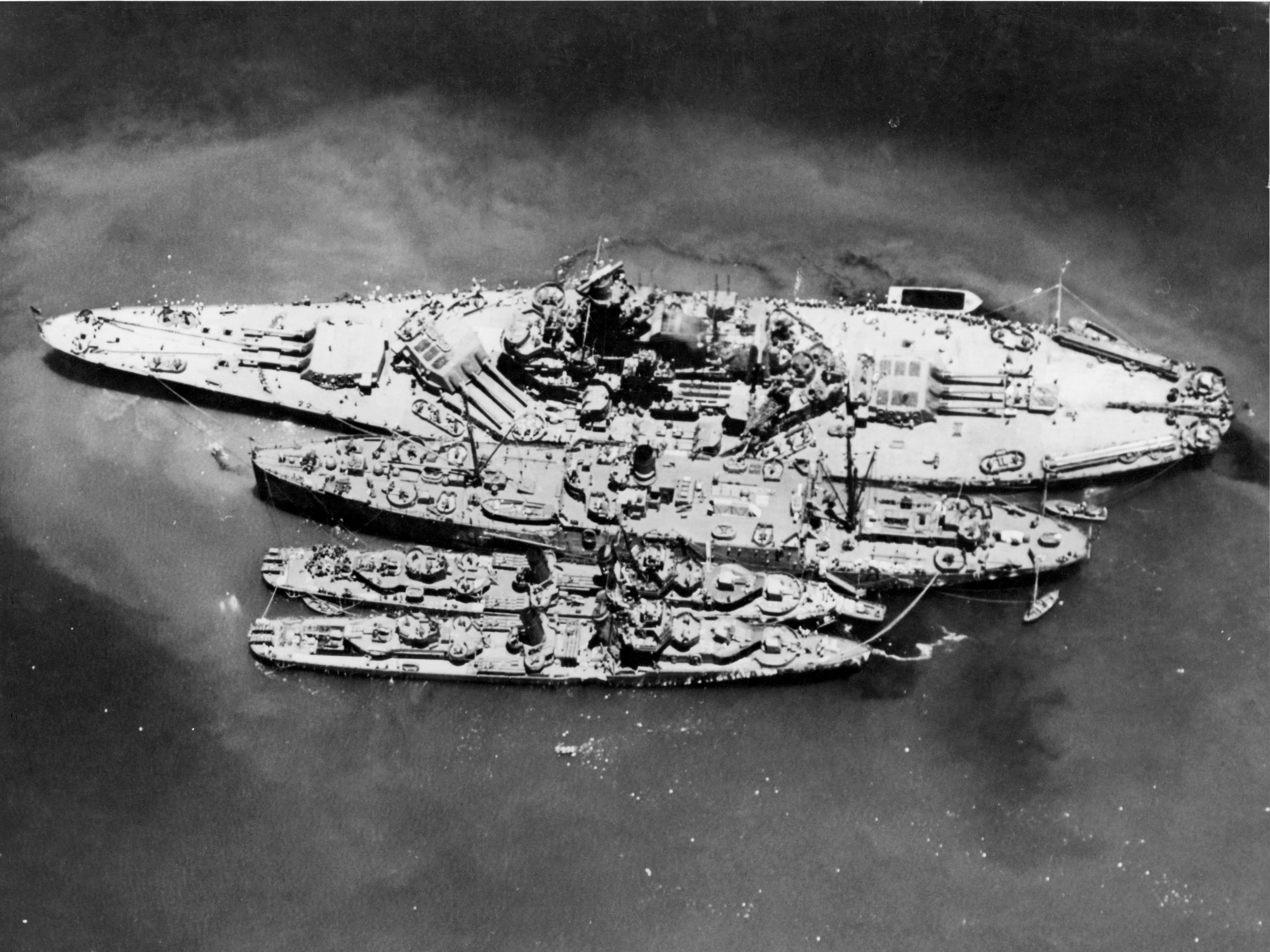
South Dakota, Prometheus, Mahan, and Lamson after South Dakota-Mahan collision following the Battle of Santa Cruz Islands

En route to Nouméa, New Caledonia, on 27 October, a Japanese submarine contact caused the American ships to take evasive action. In the confusion, Mahan and battleship South Dakota collided: both ships were seriously damaged. Commander R. W. Simpson was Mahan's captain at the time, having taken command in early 1941. Temporary repairs were made to Mahan at Noumea, and she headed back to Pearl Harbor for a new bow.

Fully repaired, Mahan left Pearl Harbor on 9 January 1943 for the South Pacific. In subsequent months she escorted convoys between the New Hebrides and the Fiji Islands, performed patrol assignments off New Caledonia, and engaged in operations in Australian waters. By August her base of operations was Milne Bay, New Guinea, which along with Buna, Papua New Guinea, was used as a staging area for an advance to gain possession of the Japanese-held northeast coast of New Guinea. The operation began in August 1943, with plans to strike Lae, New Guinea. Two weeks earlier, Mahan, under Lieutenant Commander James T. Smith, and three other US destroyers had cleared the Lae approaches and the waters between Salamaua and Finschhafen, bombarding Japanese installations at Finschhafen. In early September the Lae Task Force, under Rear Admiral Daniel E. Barbey, left Milne Bay for Lae with 8,000 Australian troops. By the evening of 4 September, the troop landing was completed. On 11 September Salamaua was under Allied control, and Lae was taken by 16 September. Mahan and other US destroyers had provided cover for the amphibious landings.

Defeated at Lae, the Japanese pulled back to Finschhafen, which the Americans and Australians chose as the site of their next offensive. On 21 September an assault force under Barbey left Buna, escorted by US destroyers including Mahan, and stopped at Lae to pick up an Australian infantry brigade. Additional US destroyers were attached to the force, preceding the convoy to the rendezvous point. On 22 September, before daylight, the amphibious force stormed the beach at Finschhafen; by noon, all troops were ashore. As the destroyers began to withdraw from the area, ten Japanese torpedo planes winged across the water, targeting Mahan and five other US destroyers. The ships returned fire, shooting down eight of the ten planes; the remaining two escaped. This scrimmage ended without any hits by enemy planes. By 2 October, Finschhafen was in the hands of the Allies.

On 14 December 1943, the amphibious force led by Barbey mustered at Buna, New Guinea, in preparation for the landing at Arawe, New Britain. With it was a bombardment group, composed of Mahan and four other US destroyers. Setting sail on the 14th, the force dropped anchor off Arawe early the next morning, and Mahan and her sister ships bombarded the Japanese shore defenses at the main landing point. The shelling from the 5"/38 guns and the bazooka-fired rockets sent the Japanese into retreat, and by mid-morning the beachhead was secured. Christmas 1943 found Mahan steaming with Barbey's amphibious force to Borgen Bay, near Cape Gloucester, New Britain. The entrance to Borgen Bay was risky, with uncharted waters; Mahan and Flusser were picked to sound out the channel and mark the way. They moved through the channel, with two minesweepers laying buoys in their wake. The force shadowed the buoys, and made its way through the passage. On the morning of the 26th, the Marines landed on the beach unopposed. The Japanese struck forcefully later that afternoon, but the Americans would not be dislodged.

In late February 1944, Mahan was in action with the Seventh Fleet supporting the troop landing at Los Negros Island in the Admiralty Islands. Although the supporting ships came under heavy fire, the troops made it ashore. Three weeks later, the Japanese force at Los Negros was defeated.

In early 1944, after extended wartime duty in the Pacific, the veteran destroyer was ordered to California for overhaul and moored again at the Mare Island Naval Shipyard. Mahan left the yard in early July for Pearl Harbor, participating in exercises there until 15 August. She returned to New Guinea on 20 October via Eniwetok, Jaluit, Guam, Saipan and Ulithi, escorting convoys between Hollandia (Jayapura) and Leyte. By the end of November 1944, Mahan was performing anti-submarine patrol off Leyte in the Philippines.

== Sinking ==
In November 1944, bad weather and hostile terrain bogged down the ground campaign to seize Leyte from the Japanese. The chief impediment to retaking Leyte was the Japanese ability to reinforce and resupply its headquarters at Ormoc City, on the west side of Leyte, and the Americans' inability to counter this advantage. Thus, the unavoidable decision was made for an amphibious attack on Ormoc.

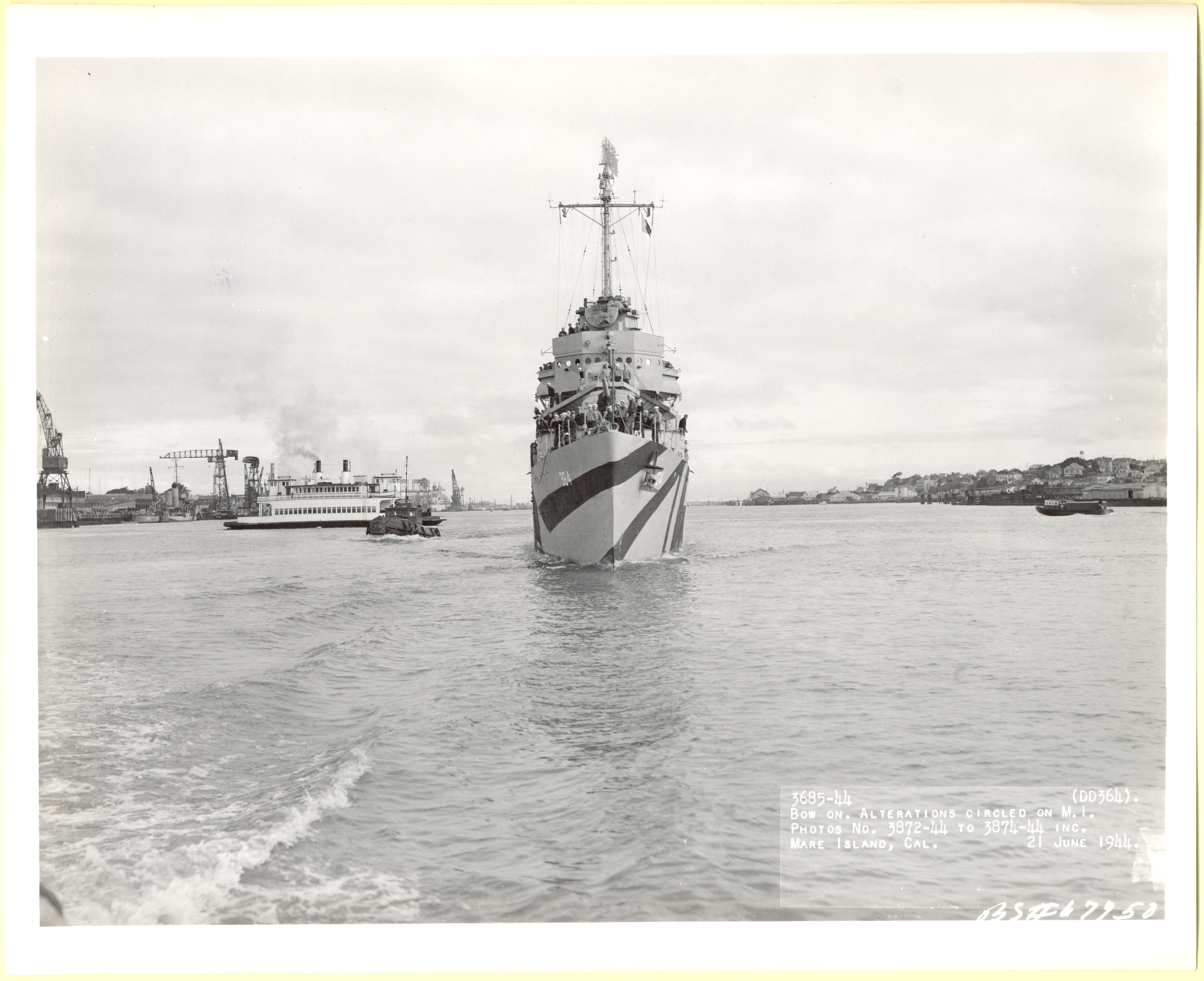
Mahan at Mare Island Naval shipyard in 1944, before returning to the South Pacific

On the morning of 7 December 1944, exactly three years after the day the Japanese attacked Pearl Harbor, troops of the US 77th Infantry Division landed south of Ormoc City. At the same time, Mahan was patrolling the channel between Leyte and Ponson Island. The amphibious strike by the infantry met with little opposition, but nine Japanese bombers and four escort fighters converged on Mahan. In Kamikaze (1997), Raymond Lamont-Brown wrote: "Observers were to record of this, one of the most unusual and devastating of kamikaze assaults of 1944, that the Japanese aircraft used torpedo-launching tactics, but when they had been hit ... they switched to kamikaze attacks, diving on Mahan". During the assault, US Army fighters downed three Japanese aircraft and damaged two more. Mahan shot down four but took three direct kamikaze hits, as David Sears observed in At War With the Wind (2008), "... the most calamitous [being] a direct hit to the superstructure near the No. 2 gun."

Exploding and awash in flames, Mahan was turned by Commander E. G. Campbell toward the picket line in a last hope to save her before issuing the order to abandon ship. The US destroyers Lamson and Walke rescued the survivors; one officer and five men were missing, and thirteen seriously wounded (including burns). Walke sank Mahan with torpedoes and gunfire because she was not salvageable.

Mahan's captain praised the performance of his crew during the ordeal. He described their response as disciplined and courageous. Mahan received five battle stars for her World War II service.
