= USS Drayton (DD-366) =

Mahan-class destroyer

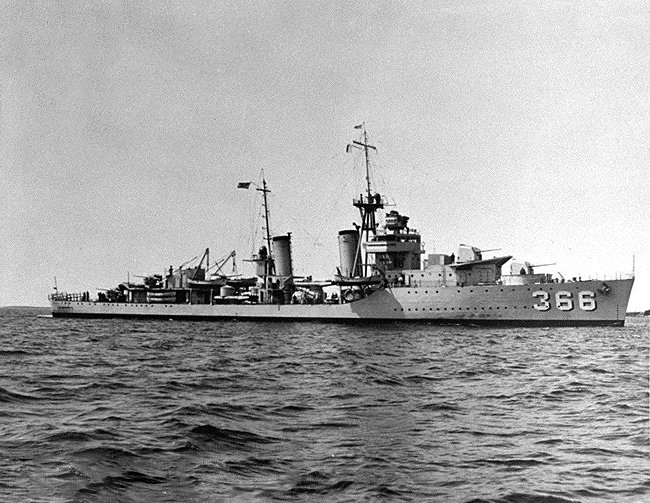
- USS Drayton (DD-366)

History

United States
- Namesake: Percival Drayton
- Builder: Bath Iron Works
- Laid down: 20 March 1934
- Launched: 26 March 1936
- Commissioned: 1 September 1936
- Decommissioned: 9 October 1945
- Stricken: 24 October 1945
- Nickname(s): "Blue Beetle"
- Fate: Sold for scrap, 20 December 1946

General characteristics
- Class & type: Mahan class destroyer
- Displacement: 1,500 tons
- Length: 341 ft 4 in (104.04 m)
- Beam: 35 ft (10.67 m)
- Draft: 9 ft 10 in (3 m)
- Speed: 37 knots (69 km/h)
- Complement: 158 officers and crew
- Armament: As Built:1 x Gun director above bridge, 5 x 5" (127 mm)/38 cal DP (5x1), 12 x 21 inch (533 mm) torpedo tubes (3x4), 4 x .50 cal (12.7 mm) (4x1), 2 x Depth Charge stern racks; c1944:1 x Mk 33 Gun Fire Control System, 4 × 5" (127mm)/38cal DP (4x1), 12 × 21" (533 mm) torpedo tubes (3x4), 2 x Mk 51 Gun Directors, 4 x Bofors 40 mm guns (2x2), 6 x Oerlikon 20 mm cannons (6x1), 2 x Depth Charge roll-off stern racks, 4 x K-gun depth charge projectors

USS Drayton (DD-366) was a Mahan-class destroyer in the United States Navy before and during World War II. She was the second ship named for Captain Percival Drayton, a career naval officer who served during the American Civil War.

Drayton was launched 26 March 1936 by the Bath Iron Works, Bath, Maine; sponsored by Miss B. E. Drayton, great-grandniece of Captain Drayton, and commissioned 1 September 1936.

== Service history ==
After her shakedown cruise to Europe from 6 October to 5 December 1936, Drayton underwent final trials and acceptance. Then sailed from Norfolk, Virginia, 6 June 1937 to join the Scouting Force at San Diego, California, 19 June. On 4 July she got underway to take part in the fruitless search for the lost aviator Amelia Earhart, participating in maneuvers at Pearl Harbor before her return to San Diego 30 July. For the next two years, Drayton exercised along the west coast, in the Hawaiian Islands, and in the Caribbean.

Drayton's homeport from 12 October 1939 was Pearl Harbor. With war raging in Europe and tension increasing in the pacific, Drayton joined in the constant exercises and tactical problems preparing the fleet for action.

=== World War II ===
Underway as plane guard for Lexington in TF 12 when the Japanese attacked Pearl Harbor, Drayton, with the force returned to Pearl Harbor 13 December 1941 after searching for Japanese raiders. Between 24 December 1941 and 7 January 1942, she escorted a convoy to Christmas Island, making two attacks on submarines en route. Four days later she got underway in the screen of Enterprise for an air strike on Bougainville on 20 February, returning to Pearl Harbor on the 24th. After screening a tanker to Suva Harbor, Fiji Islands, Drayton sailed for the United States 25 March and arrived at San Pedro, Los Angeles, 5 April. She joined in training exercises and patrol duty on the west coast until 1 August 1942.

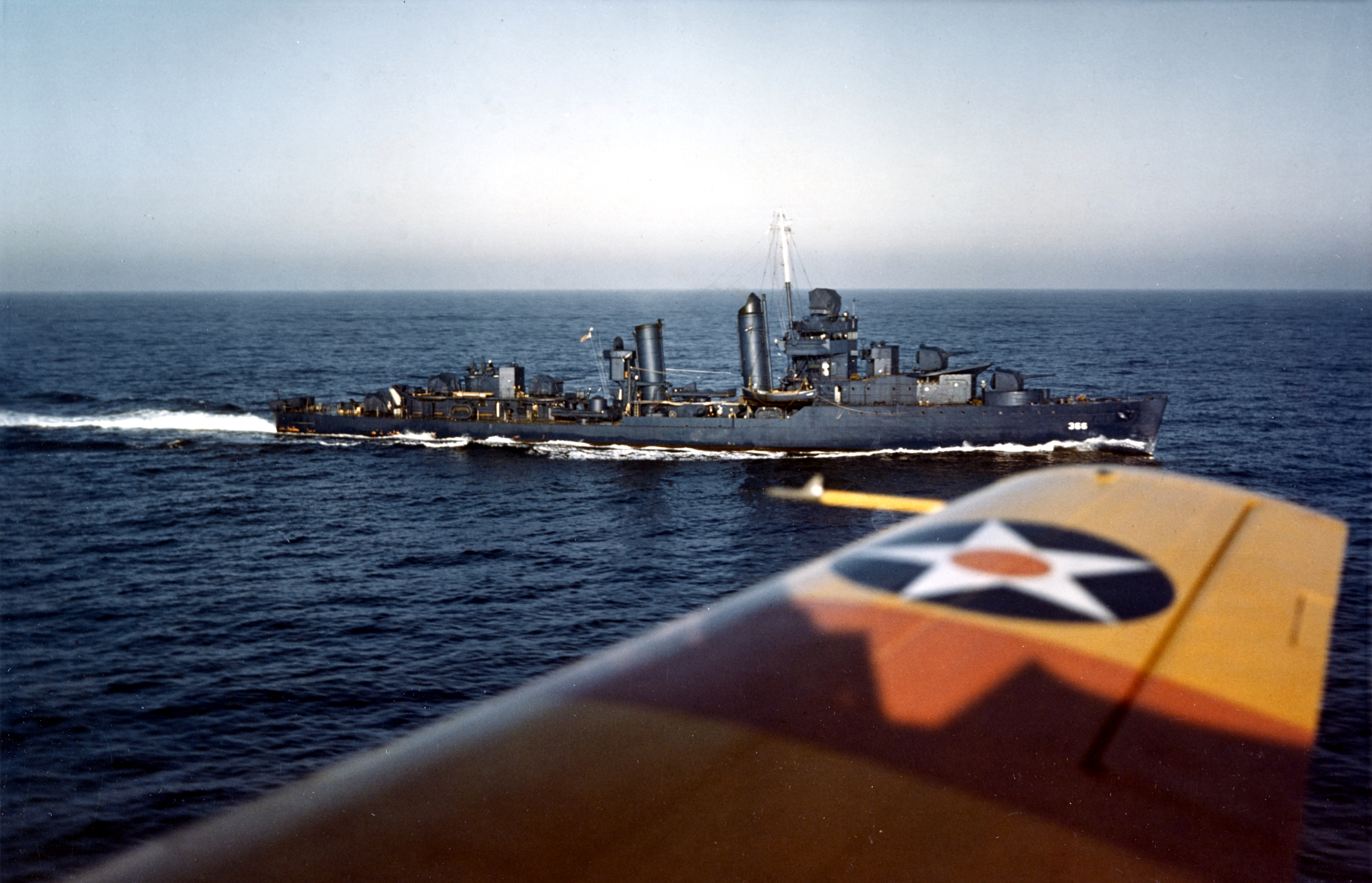
USS Drayton in October 1941.

Drayton sailed from Pearl Harbor 17 November 1942 for action in the Solomon Islands. She sortied from Espiritu Santo 29 November with TF 67 to intercept a Japanese naval force guarding transports en route to reinforce Guadalcanal. That night, the American ships battled a determined Japanese force off Tassafaronga. When the action was over, Drayton picked up 128 survivors, including the commanding officer from Northampton, and returned to Espiritu Santo 2 December. Drayton continued to operate in the Solomons campaign, bombarding Munda, New Georgia, and protecting transports bound for the Russell Islands. She escorted the unladen transports to Wellington, New Zealand, then returned to Nouméa 7 March 1943 for exercises and patrol with TF 64.

Drayton sailed from Nouméa 13 May 1943 as escort for a transport convoy and arrived at Townsville, Australia 4 days later. Through the summer, she escorted Australian transports carrying troops from Townsville to Milne Bay for the lengthy fighting on vast New Guinea. Drayton patrolled and gave fire support during the invasion landings at Lae on 4 September and bombarded Finschhafen on 22 September.

After brief overhaul at Brisbane, Australia, Drayton returned to the New Guinea area, escorting transports to Arawe, New Britain, for the landings of 15 December, and covered the marine landings near -Cape Gloucester 26 December. She screened high-speed transports from Buna Roads to the invasion of Saidor 2 January, and aside from a brief voyage to Sydney to replenish, remained on patrol and escort duty for the occupation of the Bismarck Archipelago.

Drayton carried troops for the invasion of Los Negros Island in the Admiralty Islands. Here she joined in the bombardment 29 February 1944 and remained to provide fire support. She returned with reinforcement troops from Milne Bay 4 March and began operating as headquarters for the Landing Craft Control Officer for the Admiralties. Drayton bombarded Pityilu Island 12 March then sailed for Seeadler Harbor, Manus, escorting an LST convoy before returning to New Guinea.

The destroyer got underway from Milne Bay, New Guinea, 22 March 1944 and escorted transports to Canton Island on her way to the west coast. Following an overhaul at San Francisco, California, Drayton trained out of Pearl Harbor before arriving at Eniwetok 8 August. For the next 2 months she patrolled off Maloelap, Wotje, Jaluit, and Mille—bypassed Japanese-held atolls in the Marshall Islands.

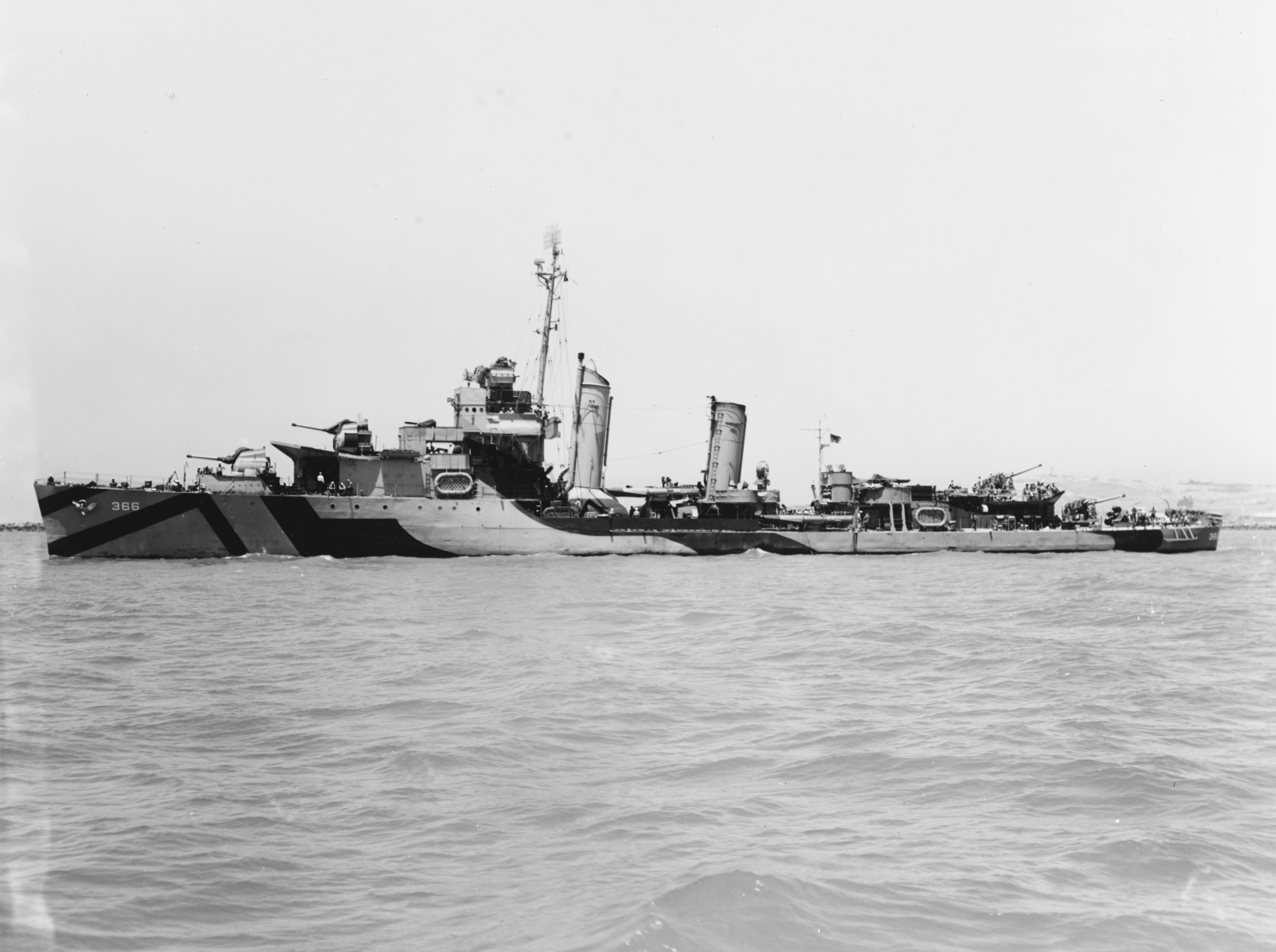
USS Drayton wearing dazzle camouflage, in 1944.

Drayton reported to the 7th Fleet at Humboldt Bay, New Guinea, on 20 October 1944; 5 days later, she got underway for patrol and escort duty in newly invaded Leyte Gulf, where she arrived 29 October. Her service in this operation included a voyage to New Guinea to bring back transports laden with reinforcements. On 6 December while screening a convoy of LCMs and LCIs to San Pedro Bay, Drayton was attacked by a twin-engine bomber which scored a near miss, killing two and wounding seven of the destroyer's crew. The next day she repulsed a group of strafing planes before they could damage her charges, and later the same morning engaged 10 or 12 enemy fighters. One aircraft crashed into the No. One 5 inch gun mount, killing 6 and wounding 12 men. Drayton extinguished her fires and carried out her mission, convoying her charges safely to harbor and then sailing unassisted to Manus, New Guinea for repairs.

Her repairs completed, Drayton sailed from Manus 26 December 1944 for the invasion of Lingayen Gulf, Luzon, 9 January 1945. She gave fire support until the 13th, then sailed to San Pedro Bay to escort a support convoy to the beachhead. From 27 January to 18 February, she served on patrol and gave fire support, bombarding enemy troops in the foothills and destroying a strong point in a cave.

Continuing to operate in the Philippines, Drayton participated in the landings at Mangarin Bay, Puerto Princesa, Cebu, Ormoc Bay, and Masbate City.

On 23 April 1945, Drayton stood out of San Pedro Bay for the invasion of Borneo, screening the actions at Tarakan from 1 to 27 May and at Balikpapan from 1 to 21 July. Returning to Manila 29 July, she got underway 7 August, and arrived at New York 12 September.

Drayton was decommissioned 9 October 1945 and sold for scrap 20 December 1946.

== Awards ==
Drayton received 11 battle stars for World War II service.

== Legacy ==
The USS Drayton is depicted on the insignia of the Bath, Maine Fire Department.
