= USS Bangust =

Cannon-class destroyer escort

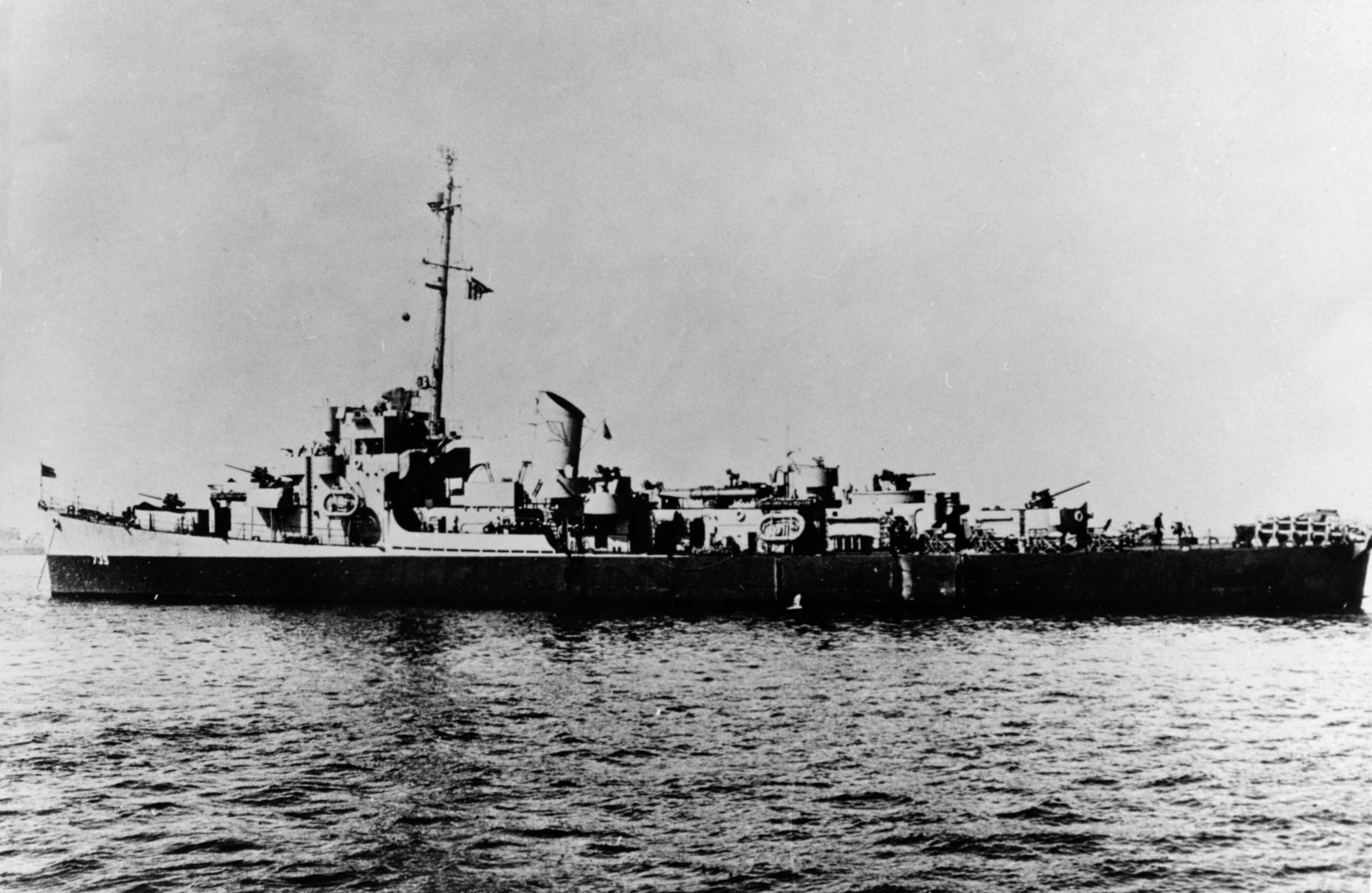

History

United States
- Name: USS Bangust (DE-739)
- Namesake: Joseph Bangust, World War II Navy Cross winner
- Builder: Western Pipe and Steel Company, Los Angeles, California
- Way number: WPS Hull No. 96
- Laid down: 11 February 1943
- Launched: 6 June 1943
- Sponsored by: Mrs. Stephen W. Gerber
- Commissioned: 30 October 1943
- Decommissioned: 17 November 1946
- Stricken: 18 April 1952
- Honors and awards: 11 battle stars for World War II
- Fate: Transferred to Peru, 21 February 1952

Peru
- Name: BAP Castilla (F-61)
- Acquired: 21 February 1952
- Fate: Scrapped, 1979

General characteristics
- Class & type: Cannon-class destroyer escort
- Displacement: 1,240 long tons (1,260 t) standard; 1,620 long tons (1,646 t) full
- Length: 306 ft (93 m) o/a; 300 ft (91 m) w/l
- Beam: 36 ft 10 in (11.23 m)
- Draft: 11 ft 8 in (3.56 m) (max)
- Propulsion: 4 × GM Mod. 16-278A diesel engines with electric drive, 6,000 shp (4,474 kW), 2 screws
- Speed: 21 knots (39 km/h; 24 mph)
- Range: 10,800 nmi (20,000 km) at 12 kn (22 km/h; 14 mph)
- Complement: 15 officers, 201 enlisted
- Armament: 3 × single Mk.22 3-inch/50-caliber guns; 1 × twin 40 mm Mk.1 AA gun; 8 × 20 mm Mk.4 AA guns; 3 × 21 inch (533 mm) torpedo tubes; 1 × Hedgehog Mk.10 anti-submarine mortar (144 rounds); 8 × Mk.6 depth charge projectors; 2 × Mk.9 depth charge tracks

USS Bangust (DE- 739) was a Cannon-class destroyer escort in service with the United States Navy from 1943 to 1946. In 1952, she was sold to Peru, where she served as BAP Castilla (D-61). She was decommissioned and scrapped in 1979.

== Namesake ==
Joseph Bangust was born on 30 May 1915 in Niles, Ohio. He enlisted in the United States Navy on 16 November 1938 at the Naval Training Station, San Diego, California. Promoted to Seaman 2nd class on 16 December 1938, he was transferred to Patrol Wing (PatWing) 2 in June 1939, and, within the wing, to Patrol Squadron 21 (VP-21) the following July. He accompanied the squadron as it deployed to the Philippine Islands with its Consolidated PBY Catalina flying boats, and in December 1939 received promotion to Seaman 1st class. Within the next year, he was promoted twice: to aviation machinist's mate 3d class (May 1940) and aviation machinist's mate 2d class (February 1941). The commencement of hostilities between the United States and Japan in December 1941 found Bangust assigned to VP-101, as VP-21 had been redesignated.

On 26 December 1941 at 23:00 six PBYs departed their advance base at Ambon in the Netherlands East Indies to attack Japanese shipping reported in Jolo harbor in the Sulu Archipelago. Bangust flew as second mechanic and gunner in the Catalina flown by Ensign Elwyn L. Christman, USNR. "Very accurate" antiaircraft fire from shore emplacements greeted the PBYs as they arrived over the harbor, but it ceased when a group of Mitsubishi A6M2 Type 0 fighters appeared to intercept the attackers. Bangust and Aviation Machinist's Mate 1st Class Andrew K. Waterman downed the first Zero. Christman released his bombs in a 60 degree dive, pulled out, and then headed west along the Sulu Archipelago. One fighter followed, attacking the plane's port side persistently, but Christman sought to foil the attacker by turning into him, forcing him to break off his runs. A duel ensued as the planes headed west and a projectile from one of the Zero's cannon holed the fuel tank, sending a stream of gasoline into the mechanic's compartment. On his next run, the Zero managed to ignite the volatile fuel. Blinded, and having suffered third-degree burns on his face, hands and neck, Bangust joined Radioman 2d Class P. H. Landers, the second radioman, in bailing out of the burning flying boat. Meanwhile, Ensign Christman rode the plane in and landed on the water. Landers, less injured than Bangust, guided the latter's swimming efforts as they struck out for the island of Lugos. About noon on 27 December, Landers glanced behind at his injured shipmate but saw only an empty life jacket, Bangust had apparently slipped from it and drowned. For his "courage and successful machine gunnery" and his "extraordinary heroism" during the action over Jolo, Bangust was awarded the Navy Cross, posthumously.

== History ==
=== United States Navy (1943–1952) ===
The ship was laid down on 11 February 1943 at Los Angeles, California, by the Western Pipe and Steel Company; launched on 6 June 1943; sponsored by Mrs. Stephen W. Gerber; and commissioned at her builder's yard on 30 October 1943.

==== 1944 ====
After fitting out, Bangust reported for shakedown training on 21 November 1943, and conducted these operations from San Diego, California. Deemed ready to join the fleet upon the completion of her shakedown on 18 December, Bangust underwent post-shakedown availability at the Naval Drydocks, San Pedro, California, and ultimately reported to Commander, Western Sea Frontier, for duty on 9 January 1944, as she cleared San Pedro for San Francisco, California. Departing thence on 13 January for Hawaiian waters, in company with Reynolds (DE-42), Bangust arrived at Pearl Harbor on 19 January.

Bangust, flagship for the Commander, Escort Division (CortDiv) 32, sailed on her first escort mission on 25 January. She stood out of Pearl Harbor in company with Pastores (AF-16), Ajax (AR-6), and Wadleigh (DD-689), all bound for the Ellice Islands. The task unit was dissolved when it arrived in Funafuti on 2 February, and Bangust continued on to the Gilbert Islands that same day. The destroyer escort reached Makin on the 5th and then moved to Tarawa the next day.

The Odyssey Chart from 1944 to 1945 for the Bangust is shown below. The chart shows her arrival at Funafuti (now Tuvalu) in the Ellice Islands. The track and dates of her 22 months of service include every major WWII battle of the US Pacific Fleet. She returned home to San Diego via Hawaii in October 1945.

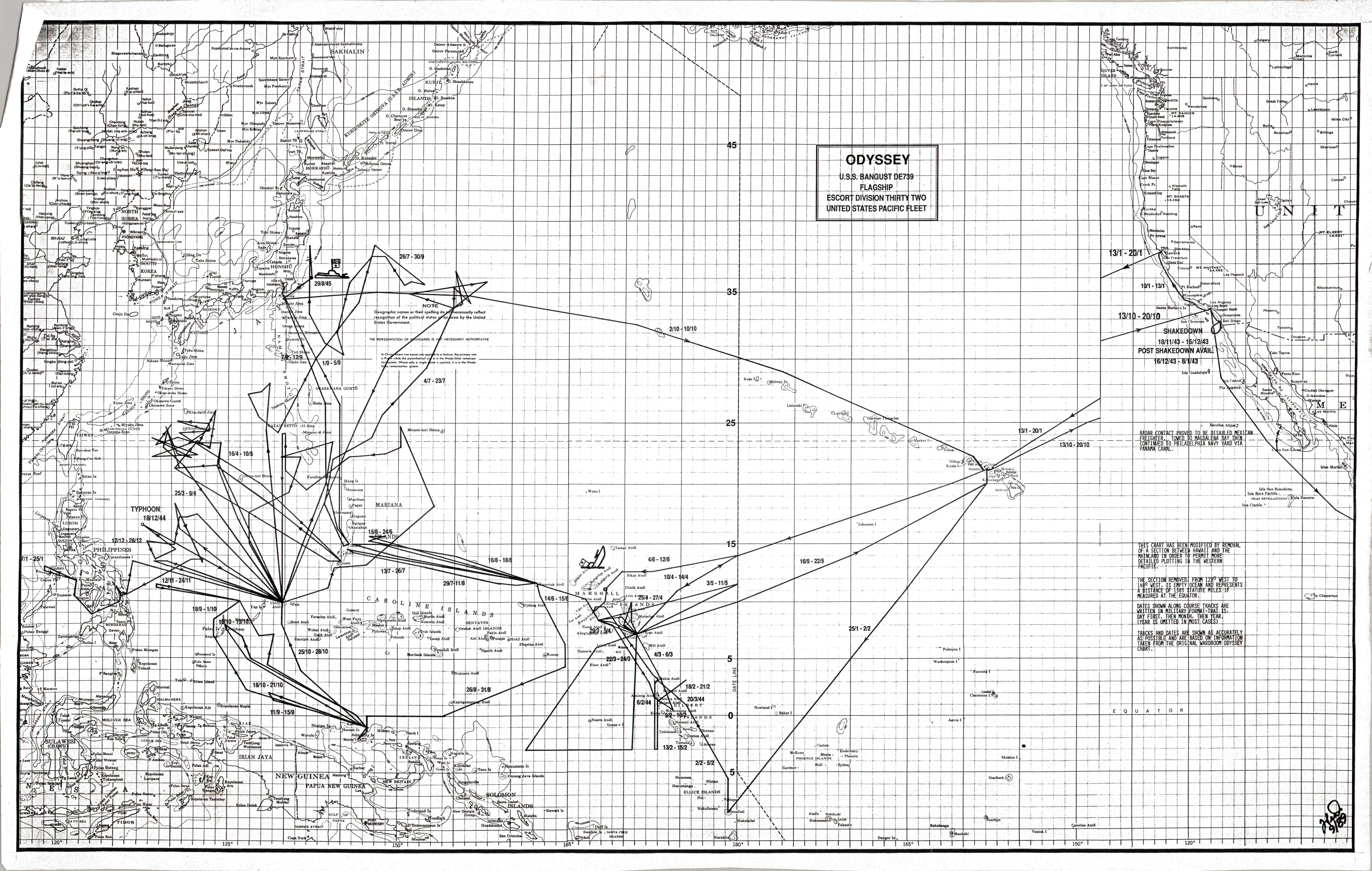
Bangust Odyssey Map 1944-1945

As noted in the chart, the tracks and dates are based on information taken from the original wardroom odyssey chart. Dates are written in military format: day first, then month, then year (year omitted in most cases).

On 8 February, she sailed in company with Greiner (DE-37) to rendezvous with Caliente (AO-53) and three merchantmen for the voyage to Majuro in the Marshall Islands. Bangust and Greiner, however, received new orders on the 10th that sent them back to Tarawa, where they arrived that same day. After that false start, the warship got underway again on the 18th with elements of Marine Night Fighter Squadron VMF(N)-532 embarked. She rendezvoused with Fleming (DE-32) and Anacapa (AG-49) and then headed for Kwajalein in the Marshalls. Bangust and her traveling companions made Roi Namur at Kwajalein on the 21st, and the two escorts returned to Tarawa on the 24th.

Assigned to the Commander, Task Group (TG) 57.7 on 1 March for local escort and patrol duties, she operated in the immediate vicinity of Tarawa harbor until 7 March 1944. Between 8 and 18 March, Bangust's embarked division commander served as senior officer present afloat (SOPA) at Tarawa, and the warship remained anchored there during that time. Soon thereafter, on 19 March, Bangust joined Eisele (DE-75) to escort USS LST-29 to Apamama lagoon, arriving the same day.

Three days later, Bangust, along with Eisele, sailed for Pearl Harbor as escort for Kenmore (AK-221), De Grasse (AK-223), and LST-29. Relieved of this duty later the same day, however, Bangust was ordered to proceed to Majuro instead. Reaching Majuro on the morning of 24 March, the destroyer escort received a hunter-killer assignment from the Commander, Service Squadron (ServRon) 10. The destroyer escort arrived on the scene of an earlier submarine attack and conducted anti-submarine warfare operations in the area until returning to Majuro on the 27th.

Two days later, Bangust escorted fleet oilers to a fueling rendezvous with the fast carriers carrying out Operation Desecrate One, the carrier support for the unfolding operations against Hollandia, Dutch New Guinea. Returning to Majuro on 5 April after having completed her mission, Bangust then departed the Marshalls on 10 April, escorting Kaskaskia (AO-27) out of those waters before being detached from that duty to return to her base of operations.

Back at Majuro on 14 April, Bangust spent the next few weeks engaged in a succession of local escort missions between Majuro and Kwajalein, taking USS LST-119 to Kwajalein between 18 and 19 April, shepherding Capable (AM-155) and ATR-44 to Majuro between 21 and 23 April, and standing out to rendezvous with Grouper (SS-214) to escort that ship into Majuro on 26 and 27 April. Operating on harbor entrance patrol on 29 and 30 April, Bangust then joined Waterman (DE-740) and Weaver (DE-741) in putting to sea on 3 May to fuel at sea from TG 50.17 before returning the same day. Escorting Lackawanna (AO-40) out of local waters on 4, 5 and 6 May, the destroyer escort then returned to Kwajalein on the 8th. Shifting back to Majuro on the 10th, Bangust lingered there until she sailed for Hawaiian waters on the 16th.

Arriving at Pearl Harbor on 22 May, Bangust entered the Pearl Harbor Navy Yard the following day and underwent repairs and alterations there until 3 June. Among the items of work accomplished were alterations to sound gear, her SL radar, and repairs to the ship's auxiliary boiler. She sailed for the Marshalls on 4 June, proceeding independently. At a point some 60 miles (97 km) from her destination, Roi, Bangust's radar picked up a contact at 2325 on 10 June 1944. Having received no reports of any Japanese or Allied submarines on her projected track, the destroyer escort tracked the contact continuously until the ship's lookouts spotted a ship emerging from a rain squall off the starboard bow at 2345. Poor visibility made identification difficult; but, as the range narrowed to 300 yards (270 m), Bangust's lookouts deemed the stranger as either a small surface craft or a submarine.

After the radar "pip" disappeared at 2348, Bangust stood toward the contact and fired a spread of starshell to illuminate the area, but without result. Just past midnight, Bangust gave the underwater challenge, which drew no response, and then launched four successive "hedgehog" barrages, the last of which triggered a series of six explosions. After these had subsided, another, larger, explosion shook the ship. That shock indicated to the destroyer escort's sailors that she herself had been torpedoed. Damage control parties immediately set about their task but only found a small leak in the forward engine room where a weld had been started. Aft, torpedomen checked the depth charge racks, thinking that a "K-gun" might have been fired accidentally, but found no charges missing. The ship's sonar operator then reported hearing two additional, but rather weak, explosions, along with hissing and gurgling noises. A strong smell of diesel oil hung in the air in the vicinity of the final attack. Postwar accounting would confirm that Bangust sank the Japanese submarine Ro-111. Bangust lingered in the area, continuing the search until 1700 on 11 June. Greiner, accompanied by the motor minesweepers YMS-282 and YMS-203 and the submarine chaser SC-1364 arrived on the scene and relieved Bangust of hunter-killer operations so that she could resume her voyage to Roi Namur, which she reached later the same day.

After serving on harbor entrance patrol off Roi on 13 June, Bangust joined Capps (DD-550) and Weaver to screen a convoy bound for Eniwetok. Reaching that place on the 15th, the destroyer escort refueled and rejoined the convoy soon thereafter, heading towards the Marianas. Arriving in the fueling area established in the waters east of Saipan, Bangust covered the oilers as they carried out their vital logistics service to the fleet until 20 June. At that time, she was detached to escort three of the petroleum carriers back to Eniwetok. Reaching her destination with her charges on the 24th, the destroyer escort remained there until the 29th, when she assumed harbor entrance patrol duties off the entrance to Eniwetok.

Dropping anchor back at Eniwetok on 30 June, Bangust remained there until the 13th, when she joined Capps and Weaver in providing cover for the departure of Neosho (AO-48) and Lackawanna. On 15 July, she joined TG 50.17 and soon operated in the vicinity of the Guam and Saipan, screening the oilers keeping the "fleet that came to stay" fueled during the operations to capture Guam. Completing this duty on 23 July, Bangust escorted her charges back to Eniwetok, arriving there three days later.

Underway for the Marianas again, this time in company with Whitman (DE-24), the destroyer escort rejoined TG 50.17 in the fueling area off Saipan on 2 August. A sound contact on 3 August enlivened her tour with the logistics ships this time around, as she conducted hunter-killer operations in hopes of nabbing her second enemy submarine. A five-charge pattern fired at the contact yielded no result; however, so she abandoned the hunter-killer work and rejoined the convoy.

Bangust, John D. Henley (DD-553) and Fair (DE-35) were detached on 11 August and ordered to anchor at Saipan. Later assigned duty as off-shore patrol, Bangust operated in this role on the 12th. Following her relief the following day, the warship served a brief tour of screening duty with CortDiv 65. Upon completion of that work, she returned to Saipan in company with Acree (DE-167).

Bangust screened a convoy to Eniwetok without incident between 16 and 19 August and, then, enjoyed a brief period of upkeep and availability from 20 to 25 August in Eniwetok Atoll. During this time, Commander, CortDiv 32 shifted his command pennant from Bangust to Waterman on the 23rd. Underway again on the 26th, Bangust escorted a convoy to Manus, arriving there on the 31st. There, she replenished, and her ship's company carried out voyage repairs between 1 and 9 September. After conducting escort missions for another oiler unit, the warship set course for Seeadler Harbor, arriving there on 15 September.

Underway again three days later, Bangust escorted three task units, again composed of oilers, to a fueling rendezvous with the warships of the U.S. 3rd Fleet, joining TG 38.3 on 26 September. Then assigned to TG 30.8, the warship escorted a task unit back to the Admiralties, reaching Manus on 1 October. Bangust underwent more voyage repairs and preparations for her next operations until the 9th and then sailed in company with Mascoma (AO-83) on the 10th, bound for Kossol Passage.

Reaching her destination on the 13th, Bangust dropped anchor and remained there until the 18th, when she got underway in company with Niobrara (AO-72), bound for the Admiralties. Reaching Manus on 21 October, the destroyer escort then sailed in company with Swearer (DE-186) on the 25th, escorting a task unit bound for the Western Carolines. The ships reached Ulithi on 28 October without incident. Bangust remained at Ulithi for the next several days, pulling several tours of local off-shore patrol duty before her departure on 12 November as escort for a fueling group bound for a rendezvous with the fleet.

Following this tour, Bangust plane-guarded for Nehenta Bay (CVE-74), before being detached to carry out other screening duties before she received orders to Ulithi on 22 November. Reaching her destination on the 24th, the warship resumed duty as CortDiv 32 flagship on 28 November. At sea on 10 December with TG 30.8, the destroyer escort turned back the same day, arriving at Ulithi on the 11th for repairs to her sound gear.

On 12 December 1944, Bangust commenced a tour of escort duty with the 3rd Fleet. On 18 and 19 December, a typhoon damaged a number of ships and sank three destroyers. Bangust stood by the battered destroyer Aylwin (DD-355) during the night of the 18th, and later took part in search efforts to locate survivors of two of the three destroyers that had sunk, Spence (DD-512) and Hull (DD-350), giving up the search on the 23rd.

==== 1945 ====
Proceeding back to Ulithi, Bangust reached her destination on Christmas Day 1944. Two days later, the Commander, CortDiv 32 shifted his pennant to Kyne (DE-744). Bangust sailed from Ulithi on 3 January 1945 as escort for another refueling group but turned back after only a day and saw Chikaskia (AO-54) safely back into Ulithi for repairs on the 5th. Underway once more on the 7th, Bangust entered Leyte Gulf on the 14th, and the Sulu Sea the following day, before she ultimately joined up with TG 30.8 on the 16th in the South China Sea. Proceeding thence to Ulithi via Leyte Gulf, Bangust reached her destination on the 18th. From there, she shepherded the oiler Neches (AO-47) to San Pedro Bay, Leyte.

Bangust got underway for a fueling rendezvous on the 21st in company with Neches, and joined up with other fleet oilers and escorts en route. Detached along with Tomahawk (AO-88), Merrimack (AO-37) and Crowley (DE-303), the destroyer escort was ordered to proceed to the Western Carolines, dropping anchor in Ulithi lagoon on 25 January. Four days later, Commander, CortDiv 32 broke his pennant in Bangust.

After completing voyage repairs, Bangust sailed on 8 February 1945 with elements of TG 50.8, a fueling group, and the oilers in this unit fueled the ships of TGs 58.1, 58.4 and 58.5 on 19 February, and TGs 58.2 and 58.3 on the 20th. Departing the task group on the 21st, Bangust then escorted a task unit back to the Western Carolines, reaching Ulithi on the 23d, where she immediately joined another task unit, and ultimately rejoined TG 50.8 on 26 February. She returned to Ulithi on 5 March.

Bangust returned to the forward areas on 25 March, conveying the vital oilers to their rendezvous with the fast carrier task groups of Task Force (TF) 58. The warship screened in and around the fueling areas until detached on 5 April. Returning to Ulithi on the 9th, the ship underwent voyage repairs at that fleet base until the 16th, when she resumed her operations with the oilers fueling the ships taking part in the operations off Okinawa. Joining TG 50.8 on 19 April, Bangust operated on antisubmarine screening station and carried out plane guard duties as required.

Detached on 7 May, Bangust sailed for Guam and reached Apra Harbor, there, on the 10th. Closing out her availability a day early, the warship got underway on 20 May to rendezvous with TG 50.8—later redesignated TG 30.8—on 24 May. Convoying a task unit of oilers to the fueling rendezvous, Bangust remained at sea with these logistics ships until 7 June, when she was detached to return to Guam. Arriving back at Apra Harbor on the 10th, the warship then underwent minor repairs and maintenance, replenished ammunition, and provisioned while her crew enjoyed a period of recreation. On 23 June, Bangust made the short run from Guam to Saipan and remained there, awaiting further orders, through 3 July 1945.

On 4 July, Bangust sailed in company with the escort carriers Admiralty Islands (CVE-99), Hollandia (CVE-97), Thetis Bay (CVE-90) and Roi (CVE-103), and their screen, Reynolds (DE-42), McClelland (DE-750) and Thorn (DD-647), to rendezvous with TG 30.8 – the task group assigned the job of logistics support to the fast carriers of TF 38, during the strikes on Tokyo and other areas of northern Japan. After making the rendezvous on 5 July, Bangust operated with TG 30.8 until detached on 18 to return to Ulithi, where she arrived on 23 July. Underway on 25 July 1945, Bangust carried out an antisubmarine sweep to cover the exit of the heavy ships from Ulithi, and then proceeded to sea to join TG 30.8 on 29 July.

Following Japan's mid-August capitulation, Bangust remained at sea with TG 30.8. On 27 August, having already embarked a prize crew, she headed for a rendezvous point to take the surrender of I-14. Escorted by four General Motors FM fighters and Murray (DD-576), Bangust made the rendezvous the following day.

Leaving Japanese submarine I-14 off Sagami Wan on 28 August, Bangust moved alongside the submarine tender, Proteus (AS-19), inside Sagami Wan proper to disembark the crew of the Japanese submarine; on 30 August, the destroyer escort then fueled from Mascoma (AO-83). Underway for Tokyo Bay on 31 August 1945, Bangust arrived there later the same day. She paused there only briefly, however, for she sailed the following day for Saipan, reaching her destination on 5 September. Underway two days later, Bangust, in company with Kyne, shaped course back to Japan with a convoy of four merchantmen. Reaching Tokyo on 13 September and delivering her charges, the destroyer escort shifted to Yokosuka Ko the following day.

Bangust sailed for the United States on 2 October 1945 in company with other ships in her division and, after a brief stop at Pearl Harbor between 10 and 13 October, reached San Pedro, California, on 20 October. Reporting to Commander, Western Sea Frontier, for two weeks maintenance and onward routing, Bangust departed the west coast on 6 November. Reaching the Panama Canal Zone on 16 November, the destroyer escort transited the Panama Canal and departed Panama waters on the 17th, bound for the east coast of the United States.

==== 1946–1947 ====
The destroyer escort reached the Philadelphia Naval Shipyard on 22 November 1945 and, after pre-inactivation overhaul, was decommissioned on 14 June 1946 at Green Cove Springs, Florida. Earmarked for deferred disposal status on 21 March 1947, Bangust was taken to Charleston Naval Shipyard in June 1947. Towed there by Challenge (ATA-201) on 17 and 18 June, the ship remained in the yard until 13 August when, under tow of Tunica (ATA-178) she was taken back to Mayport, Florida, arriving the next day. She was inactivated on 20 October 1947 and her name was struck from the Naval Vessel Register on 18 April 1952 following her transfer to Peru.

=== Peruvian Navy (1952–1979) ===
Bangust was transferred to the government of Peru on 26 October 1951 under the terms of the Mutual Defense Assistance Program (MDAP). She was renamed Castilla (D-61) and served as such until she was stricken and broken up in 1979.

== Awards ==
Bangust earned eleven battle stars for her World War II service.
