= HMS BYMS-2203 =

Minesweeper of the Royal Navy

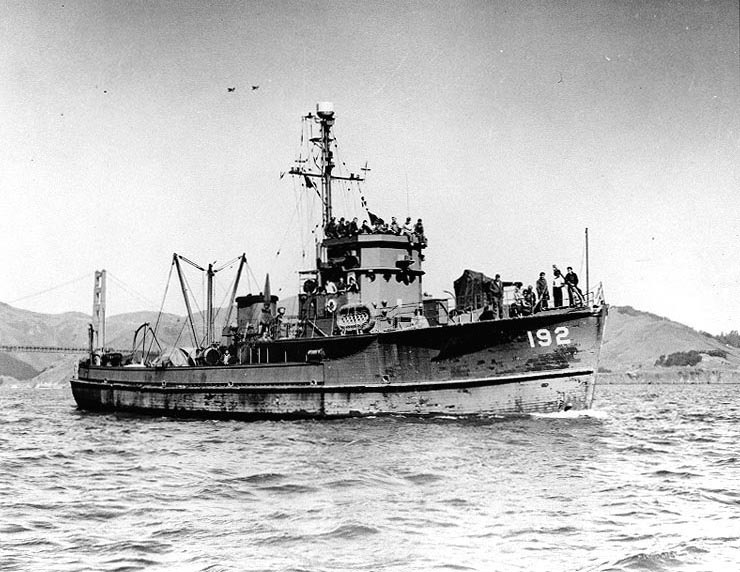
- A YMS-1-class minesweeper

History

United Kingdom
- Name: HMS BYMS-2203 (J1003)
- Laid down: 15 January 1942 as YMS-203
- Launched: 15 January 1943
- Completed: 31 August 1943
- Commissioned: Unknown
- Decommissioned: Unknown
- Fate: Returned to the U.S. Navy, 12 November 1946

History

United States
- Name: USS BYMS-203
- Acquired: returned from the Royal Navy, 12 November 1946
- Stricken: 13 December 1946
- Fate: Unknown
- Notes: Never commissioned in U.S. Navy

General characteristics
- Class & type: YMS-1-class auxiliary motor minesweeper
- Displacement: 270 tons
- Length: 136 ft (41 m)
- Beam: 24 ft 6 in (7.47 m)
- Draught: 8 ft (2.4 m)
- Propulsion: two 880bhp General Motors 8-268A diesel engines, two shafts
- Speed: 15 knots (28 km/h)
- Complement: 32
- Armament: 1 × 3"/50 caliber gun mount; 2 × 20 mm guns; 2 × depth charge projectors

HMS BYMS-2203 (J 1003) was a YMS-1-class auxiliary motor minesweeper originally built for the United States Navy during World War II. Upon completion she was transferred to the Royal Navy under Lend-Lease. She was returned to the U.S. Navy after conclusion of the war, and struck soon after. She was never commissioned in the U.S. Navy.

She was laid down 15 January 1942 as YMS-203 by the Hiltebrant Dry Dock Co. of Kingston, New York. She was launched on 15 January 1943 and delivered 31 August 1943 and transferred to the Royal Navy as BYMS-2203.

Little is known of her war record. She sailed from the United Kingdom to Malta as a part of Convoy KMS 43 on 11 December 1943, and, at least for a time, she served in the Pacific. After USS Bangust (DE-739) had already attacked a submarine target 60 miles (97 km) of Roi in June 1944, BYMS-2203 assisted USS Greiner, USS SC-1364, and BYMS-2282 on in searching for Japanese submarine Ro-111, even though, unknown at the time, Bangust’s attack had already been successful.

She was returned to U.S. custody on 12 November 1946 and struck from the Naval Vessel Register, 13 December 1946. Her final fate is unknown.
