= Deignan =

Deignan is a surname that could refer to:

- Elizabeth Mary "Lizzie" Deignan (born 1988), English cyclist
- Herbert Girton Deignan (1906-1968), American ornithologist
- Kathleen Deignan (born 1947), Irish-American theologian, author and singer
- Martina Deignan (late 20th c.), American actress
- Osborn Deignan (1873-1915), American navy sailor and Warrant Officer)
- Philip Deignan (born 1983), Irish cyclist
- Simon Deignan (1922–2006), Gaelic football player
