= HMS BYMS-2282 =

Minesweeper of the Royal Navy

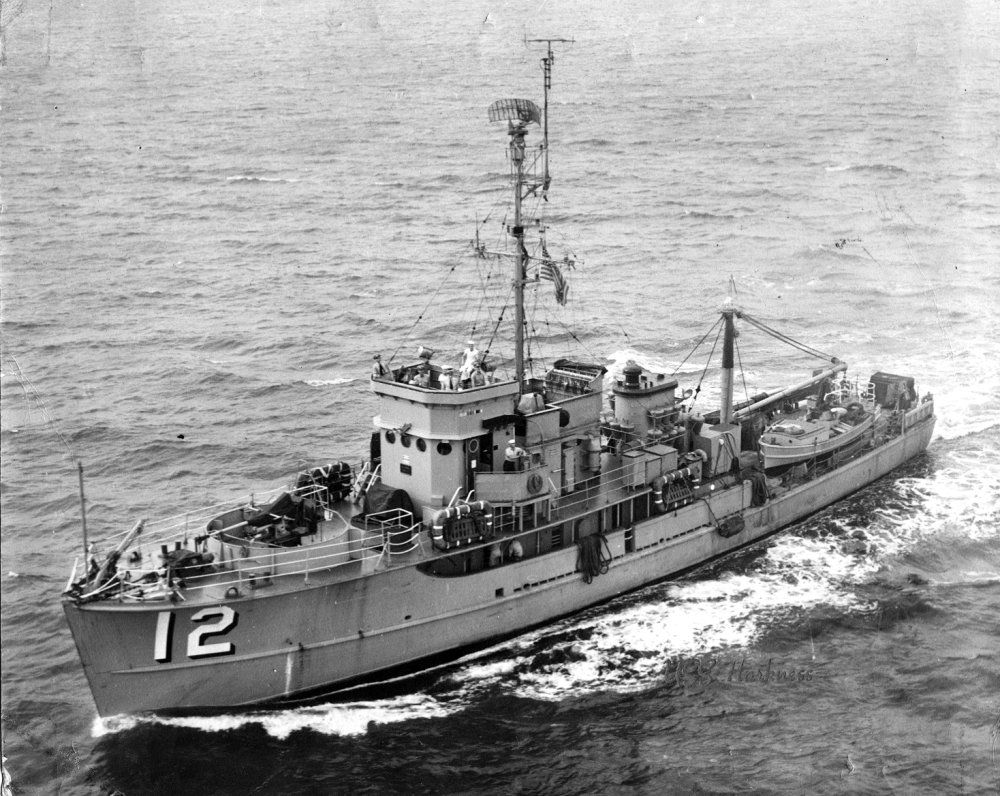
- A YMS-1-class minesweeper

History

United Kingdom
- Name: HMS BYMS-2282 (J1082)
- Builder: San Diego Marine Construction Co., San Diego, California
- Laid down: 15 August 1942, as USS YMS-282
- Launched: 30 November 1942
- Completed: 26 August 1943
- Stricken: 28 August 1947
- Fate: Transferred to Poland, 18 April 1948

Poland
- Name: ORP Mors
- Acquired: 18 April 1948
- Stricken: 8 January 1957
- Fate: Unknown

General characteristics
- Class & type: YMS-1-class auxiliary motor minesweeper
- Displacement: 270 long tons (274 t)
- Length: 136 ft (41 m)
- Beam: 24 ft 6 in (7.47 m)
- Draft: 8 ft (2.4 m)
- Propulsion: 2 × 880 bhp (656 kW) General Motors 8-268A diesel engines, 2 shafts
- Speed: 15 knots (28 km/h; 17 mph)
- Complement: 32
- Armament: 1 × 3"/50 caliber guns; 2 × 20 mm guns; 2 × depth charge projectors

HMS BYMS-2282 was a BYMS-class minesweeper of the Royal Navy during the Second World War. She was built as YMS-282 for the United States Navy but was transferred under Lend-Lease to the United Kingdom upon completion and never commissioned into the United States Navy. BYMS-2282 was transferred to the Polish Navy after conclusion of the war and served as ORP Mors.

== Career ==
She was laid down on 15 August 1942 as YMS-282 by the San Diego Marine Construction Co., San Diego, California and launched on 30 November 1942. Upon completion on 26 August 1943, she was transferred to the Royal Navy under Lend-Lease as HMS BYMS-2282.

She participated, along with BYMS-2203 in the aftermath of the sinking of the RO-111 with Bangust (DE-739).

She was transferred to the Polish Navy on 18 April 1948 as ORP Mors and struck on 8 January 1957. Her ultimate fate is unknown.
