= Francis Kelly (Medal of Honor) =

U.S. Navy Medal of Honor recipient (1859–1938)

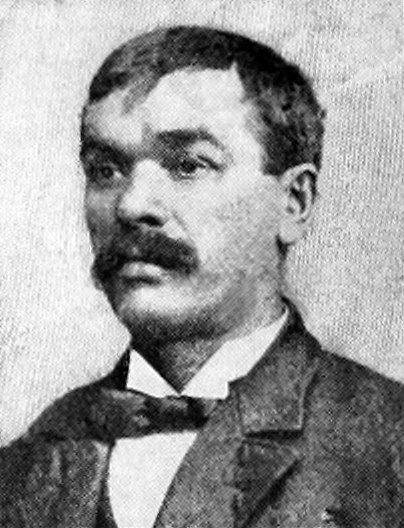
- Watertender Francis Kelly
- Born: Archibald Houston; July 5, 1859; Anderston, Glasgow, Scotland
- Died: May 19, 1938 (aged 77); Glasgow, Scotland
- Burial place: Sandymount Cemetery, Glasgow, Scotland
- Military career
- Allegiance: United States of America
- Branch: United States Navy
- Rank: Chief Machinist's Mate
- Unit: USS Merrimac
- Conflicts: Spanish–American War
- Awards: Medal of Honor

Francis Kelly (July 5, 1859 – May 19, 1938) was a United States Navy sailor and a recipient of America's highest military decoration—the Medal of Honor—for his actions in the Spanish–American War.

== Biography ==
Francis Kelly was born Archibald Houston in Anderston, Glasgow, Scotland. He enlisted in the US Navy from Massachusetts, and served as a watertender in the collier USS Merrimac during the Spanish–American War. Kelly was one of eight volunteer crew members when Rear Admiral William T. Sampson ordered Merrimac sunk to block the entrance of Santiago Harbor, Cuba. On the night of 2-June 3, 1898, during the attempt to execute this mission, Merrimac's steering gear was disabled by enemy gunfire, and she sank without obstructing navigation. Her crewmen were rescued by the Spanish and made prisoners-of-war. After the Battle of Santiago de Cuba destroyed the Spanish fleet a month later, Kelly and his shipmates were released. For his actions during this operation, he was awarded the Medal of Honor.

Francis Kelly remained in the Navy after the Spanish–American War, ultimately obtaining the rank of chief machinist's mate. He returned home to Glasgow, and died there in 1938, his death certificate states "Archibald Houston (formerly Francis Kelly), US naval pensioner". He is buried at Sandymount Cemetery, Glasgow, Scotland.

== Medal of Honor citation ==
Kelly's official Medal of Honor citation reads as follows:

In connection with the sinking of the U.S.S. Merrimac at the entrance to the harbor of Santiago de Cuba, June 2, 1898. Despite heavy fire from the Spanish batteries, KELLY displayed extraordinary heroism throughout this operation.

== See also ==
- List of Medal of Honor recipients for the Spanish–American War
