= John E. Murphy =

John Edward Murphy
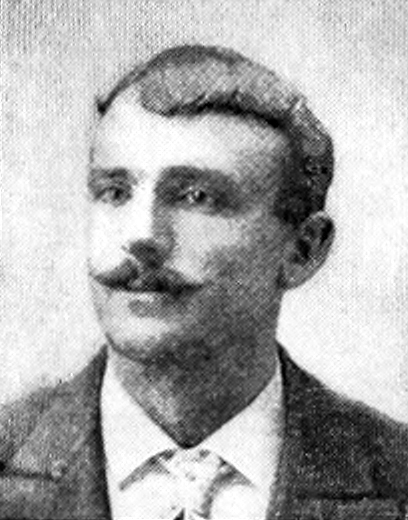
- Chief Boatswain John E. Murphy
- Born: May 3, 1869; Ireland
- Died: April 9, 1941 (aged 71)
- Burial place: Fort Rosecrans National Cemetery; San Diego, California
- Military career
- Allegiance: United States of America
- Branch: United States Navy
- Service years: to 1905
- Rank: Chief Boatswain
- Units: USS Iowa (BB-4); USS Merrimac (1894); USS Oregon (BB-3); USS Pensacola (1859); USS Constellation (1854); USS New York (ACR-2); USS Buffalo (1892)
- Conflicts: Spanish–American War; *Sinking of the Merrimac
- Awards: Medal of Honor

John Edward Murphy (May 3, 1869 – April 9, 1941) was a United States Navy sailor and a recipient of America's highest military decoration—the Medal of Honor—for his actions in the Spanish–American War.

== Biography ==
Murphy enlisted in the U.S. Navy from New York and served in the battleship USS Iowa (BB-4) as a coxswain during the Spanish–American War. Coxswain Murphy was one of eight volunteer crew members of the collier USS Merrimac (1898), which Rear Admiral William T. Sampson ordered sunk to block the entrance of Santiago Harbor, Cuba. On the night of June 2/3, 1898, during the attempt to execute this mission, Merrimac's steering gear was disabled by enemy gunfire, and she sank without obstructing navigation. Her crewmen were rescued by the Spanish and made prisoners-of-war. After the Battle of Santiago de Cuba destroyed the Spanish fleet a month later, Murphy and his shipmates were released. For their part in this operation, all eight men were awarded Medals of Honor.

On June 15, 1898, while he was still in Spanish custody, Murphy was promoted to the warrant officer rank of Boatswain. In October 1898, Murphy was assigned to the battleship USS Oregon (BB-3), which soon went to the Asiatic Station. He reported for training duty on board USS Pensacola (1859) in September 1901 and several months later began similar service in USS Constellation (1854). In the Summer of 1903 he was assigned to the armored cruiser USS New York (ACR-2) in the Pacific Squadron. Murphy was promoted to Chief Boatswain on June 15, 1904. For his last tour, he served in USS Buffalo (1892), also in the Pacific, and was placed on the retired list on August 1, 1905.

Chief Boatswain John Edward Murphy died at age 71 and was buried at Fort Rosecrans National Cemetery, San Diego, California. His grave can be found in the officer's section, grave 363 GPS (lat/lon): 32.41418, −117.14673.

== Medal of Honor citation ==
Coxswain Murphy's official Medal of Honor citation reads:

In connection with the sinking of the U.S.S. Merrimac at the entrance to the harbor of Santiago de Cuba, 2 June 1898. Despite heavy fire from the Spanish shore batteries, Murphy displayed extraordinary heroism throughout this operation.

== See also ==
- List of Medal of Honor recipients
- List of Medal of Honor recipients for the Spanish–American War
