= San Diego Marine =

Shipyard in San Diego, California, United States

Coordinates: 32.692202°N 117.144342°W

San Diego Marine was a shipbuilding company in San Diego, California. In order to support demand for ships during World War II, San Diego Marine built minesweepers and sub chasers. San Diego Marine was opened in 1915 as San Diego Marine Construction Company by Captain Oakley J. Hall. It was sold to Campbell Industries in 1972. It was sold again in 1979 and renamed Southwest Marine. Boatbuilding ended in 1983. Southwest Marine was sold to U.S. Marine Repair in 2003. The named changed to BAE Systems Ship Repair in 2005. The shipyard is located at 2205 East Belt Street, San Diego.

== YMS-1-class minesweeper ==
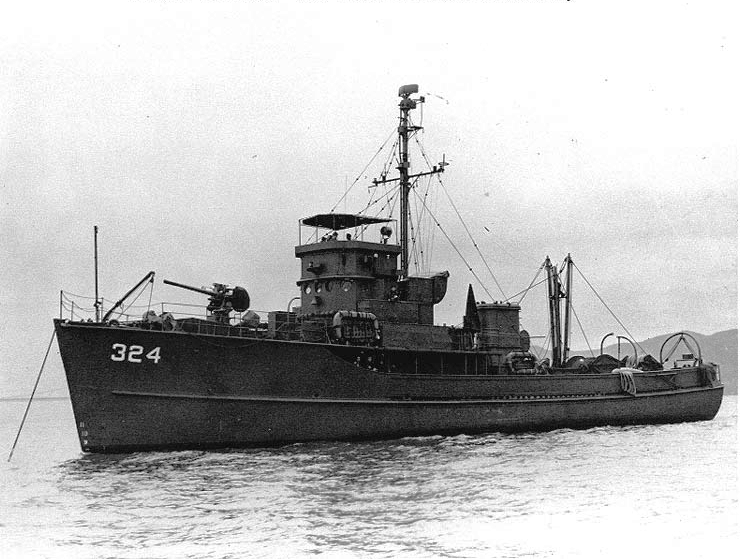
YMS-1-class minesweeper

San Diego Marine built YMS-1-class minesweepers for the United States Navy in 1942 and 1943. The ships had a displacement of 270 tons, a length of 136 ft 0 in (41.45 m), a beam of 24 ft 6 in (7.47 m), a draft of 10 ft (3.0 m), and a top speed of 15 knots (28 km/h; 17 mph). The ships had a crew of 32. The vessels were armed with one 40 mm gun.

Ships:

- YMS-113 (later USS Brant)
- YMS-114 (later USS Courlan
- YMS-115
- YMS-116
- YMS-143
- YMS-144
- YMS-145
- YMS-146
- YMS-281
- YMS-282 (later HMS BYMS-2282)
- YMS-283
- YMS-284

== PCS-1376-class patrol craft sweeper ==
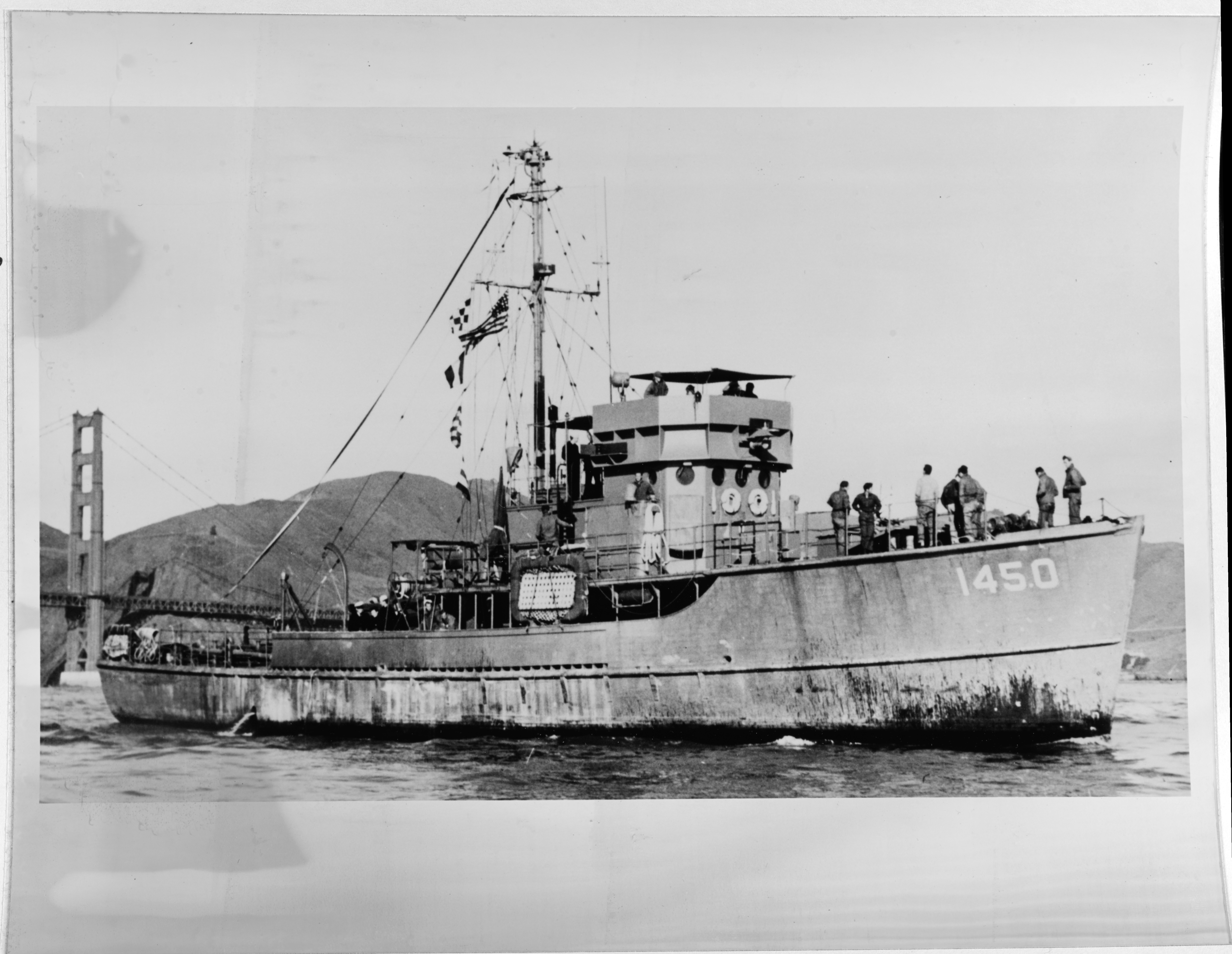
PCS-1376-class patrol craft sweeper

San Diego Marine built PCS-1376-class patrol craft sweepers (planned as a submarine chaser) that had displacement of 245 long tons (249 t) light, and 340 long tons (345 t) full load. They had a length of 136 ft (41 m), a beam of 24 ft 6 in (7.47 m), a draft of 7 ft 9 in (2.36 m). Power from two General Motors 8-268A diesel engines with 800 brake horsepower (597 kW) each. They used a Snow and Knobstedt single reduction gear to two shafts. The vessels had a top speed of 14 knots (26 km/h; 16 mph). They housed complement of 57 officers and enlisted. The patrol craft sweepers were armed with one 3"/50 caliber gun, one 40 mm gun, two 20 mm guns, four depth charge projectors, one Hedgehog anti-submarine mortar and two depth charge tracks.

Built:

- PCS-1445
- PCS-1446
- PCS-1447, renamed YMS-475
- PCS-1448, renamed YMS-476

== District Patrol Craft ==
San Diego Marine built District Patrol Craft of 180 gross register tons (GRT), 92 net register tons (NRT), a length 90 to 110 feet (27 to 34 m), a beam of 23 feet (7.0 m), and a draft of 10 feet (3.0 m). They were powered by one diesel engine connected to one propeller with 275 hp (205 kW). These were built in 1930 and 1931 and taken over by the United States Navy in 1941.

- YP-264
- YP-236
- YP-283
- PYc-16, later became a submarine chaser

== Landing Craft Mechanized ==
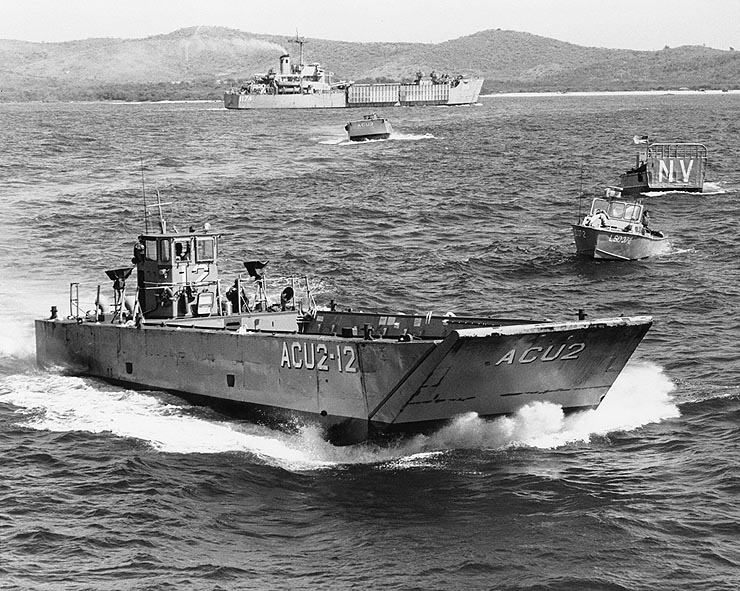
LCM Landing Craft Mechanized

San Diego Marine built 15 landing craft mechanized (LCM) or "Mike Boat" in 1979. LCMs are riverboats and mechanized landing craft. These are used by the United States Navy and Army during the Vietnam War. LCM stands for "Landing Craft Mechanized, Mark 8", a use of the phonetic alphabet, LCM being "Lima Charlie Mike". LCMs have a displacement of 57.8 long tons (58.7 t), and 58.7 long tons (59.6 t) light and 111.4 long tons (113.2 t) loaded. The LCM had a length of 73 ft 7/12 in (22.265 m), a beam of 21 ft 0 in (6.4 m), a draft of a draft of 4 ft 7/12 in (1.234 m) and draft of 5 ft 3 in (1.60 m) loaded. Power is from two Pak GMC 6-71 or Gray Marine 6-71 diesels paired to two hydrostatic transmissions Detroit 12V-71 diesel engines, with twin screws. LCM have a top speed of 12 knots (22 km/h; 14 mph) light and 9 knots (17 km/h; 10 mph) loaded. LCM have a capacity of 53.5 long tons (54.4 t) of cargo and a crew of 4 to 6. They were armed with two .50 caliber M2 Browning machine guns.

== See also ==
- California during World War II
- Maritime history of California
