= USS Brant (AMS-43) =

Minesweeper of the United States Navy

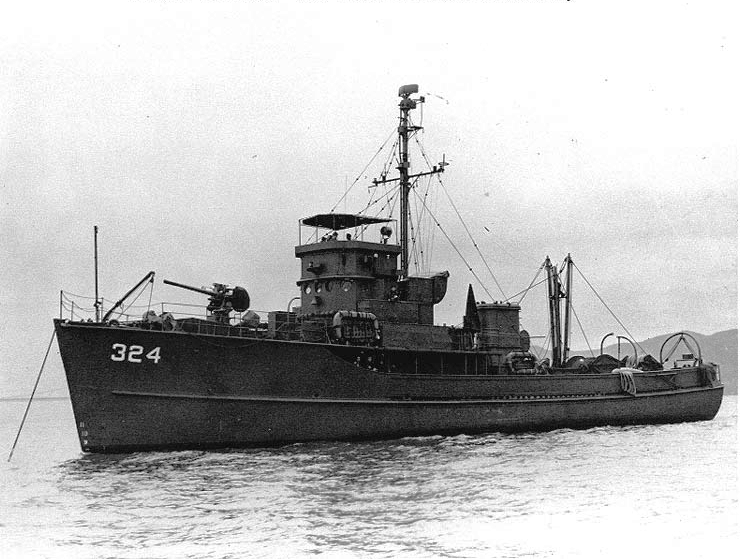
- A YMS-1-class minesweeper

History

United States
- Name: USS YMS-113
- Builder: San Diego Marine Construction Co.; San Diego, California
- Launched: 13 February 1942
- Sponsored by: Miss Virginia Sue Blakely
- Commissioned: 12 June 1942
- Decommissioned: 7 August 1946
- In service: 1 December 1946 as Naval Reserve training vessel, Detroit, Michigan
- Renamed: USS Brant (AMS-43) on 1 September 1947
- Namesake: brant
- Out of service: 10 February 1950
- Recommissioned: 12 February 1951
- Reclassified: MSCO-43, 7 February 1955
- Decommissioned: 23 October 1955
- Stricken: 1 November 1959

General characteristics
- Class & type: YMS-1-class auxiliary motor minesweeper
- Displacement: 270 tons
- Length: 136 ft 0 in (41.45 m)
- Beam: 24 ft 6 in (7.47 m)
- Draft: 10 ft (3.0 m)
- Speed: 15 knots (28 km/h)
- Complement: 32
- Armament: 1 × 40 mm gun

USS Brant (MSC(O)-43/AMS-43/YMS-113) was a YMS-1-class minesweeper built for the United States Navy during World War II.

== History ==
Brant was laid down as YMS-113 at San Diego, California, by San Diego Marine Construction Co.; launched on 13 February 1942; sponsored by Miss Virginia Sue Blakely; and commissioned on 12 June 1942.

On 18 June, the motor minesweeper moved north to Los Angeles, California, where she completed her trials and loaded supplies. She stood out of Los Angeles on 26 June and shaped a course for Hawaii in company with USS Brazos (AO-4), USS Chestnut (AN-11), and a number of other minesweepers. She and her sailing mates arrived in Pearl Harbor on 7 July, but remained at Oahu only two days before putting to sea again in company with Brazos, YMS-97, and YMS-117. This group arrived at Pago Pago, Samoa, on 22 July; but YMS-113 returned to sea a week later, bound for the Fiji Islands. She entered port at Suva on 2 August and served in the Fiji Islands for the next 13 months. Her primary missions were mine clearance and escort duty between the islands of the group. She also carried passengers to and from the various islands of the cluster, served as a pilot boat, and conducted antisubmarine patrols.

On 27 August 1943, YMS-113 departed Tautoka and shaped a course for New Caledonia. The minesweeper arrived in Nouméa three days later and began a nine-month tour of duty clearing mines and patrolling against Japanese submarines. She sailed from Nouméa on 25 August 1944 and entered Auckland, New Zealand, on 28 August. Her crew enjoyed liberty at that port until 15 June when the warship headed back to Nouméa. YMS-113 resumed her duties at Nouméa on 28 June and continued them until moving to Espiritu Santo in the New Hebrides early in November for her first overhaul. This repair period ended on 6 December, and the warship returned to her duties at Nouméa.

On 4 June 1945, the motor minesweeper got underway from New Caledonia and set a course for Hawaii. After stops at Funafuti, Canton, and Palmyra Islands, she arrived in Pearl Harbor on 22 June. Upon her completion of voyage repairs, she began a 10-month tour of duty in the Hawaiian Islands broken only by a round-trip voyage to San Pedro, Los Angeles, in November and December 1945. The ship put to sea from Pearl Harbor on 23 April 1946 and stopped at San Francisco and San Diego before transiting the Panama Canal and steaming via Charleston, South Carolina, to New York where she arrived on 1 July.

She remained there until the 17th when she got underway for Canadian waters. She stopped at Quebec on 23 July but soon continued on up the St. Lawrence River to Lake Ontario and thence farther into the Great Lakes. She arrived at Detroit, Michigan, on 28 July and was decommissioned there on 7 August 1946. She was turned over to the Naval Reserve establishment there to be used as a training vessel. On 1 December 1946, she was placed in service. YMS-113 was renamed and redesignated Brant (AMS-43) on 1 September 1947. At the end of 1949, Brant moved to Orange, Texas, where she was inactivated on 10 February 1950.

The minesweeper remained with the reserve fleet for a little more than a year. She was recommissioned on 12 February 1951 and on 5 March, reported to the Commander, Mine Force, Atlantic Fleet, at Charleston. Brant operated out of Charleston until near the end of 1951. At that time, she moved north to Yorktown, Virginia, to become a school ship at the Mine Warfare School. That assignment occupied her until 25 November 1952 when she sailed for Charleston. Her stay there, however, proved brief. On 5 January 1953, she got underway for Panama City, Florida, and, five days later, reported for duty at the Mine Countermeasures Station. For the next four months, she participated in the development of new minesweeping techniques and equipment.

On 11 May, the minesweeper departed Panama City and headed back to Charleston where she entered the naval shipyard on 1 June for her regular overhaul. She completed repairs on 3 August and departed Charleston on the 12th for degaussing. Following that, she conducted refresher training out of Charleston and Key West. She returned to Charleston for normal operations until 30 November. At that time, she headed back to Key West for a period in drydock. The end of 1953 saw her back at Charleston. On 4 January 1954, Brant stood out of Charleston for Yorktown, Virginia. She reached her destination on the 27th and began her second tour of training duty at the Mine Warfare School. That assignment—broken only by periodic availabilities and participation in an Atlantic Fleet exercise in October and November 1954 occupied the remainder of her active career. On 7 February 1955, she was redesignated MSC(O)-43.

On 19 August 1955, Brant exited Chesapeake Bay on her way to Green Cove Springs, Florida. The minesweeper arrived at Green Cove Springs on 22 August and began preparations for inactivation. Brant was decommissioned on 23 October 1955 and was berthed with the Green Cove Springs Group, Atlantic Reserve Fleet. Her name was struck from the Naval Vessel Register on 1 November 1959.
