= USS Merrimac (1894) =

Former Norwegian collier acquired by the US Navy

Coordinates: 19°58′37″N 75°52′18″W

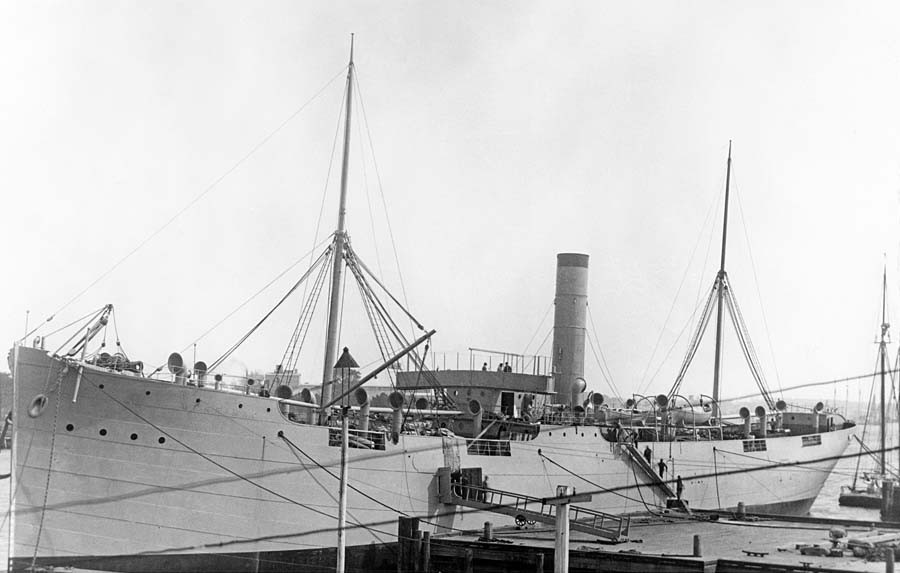
- Merrimac being fitted out at Norfolk Navy Yard, Portsmouth, VA, 23 April 1898

History
- Name: 1894: Solveig; 1897: Merrimac
- Namesake: 1877 Merrimack River
- Owner: 1894: Christian Michelsen & Co; 1897: JN Robbins & Co; 1898: JT Hogan & Sons; 1898: United States Navy
- Port of registry: 1894: (Norway) Bergen; 1897: (United States) New York
- Builder: CS Swan & Hunter, Wallsend
- Yard number: 194
- Launched: 29 September 1894
- Completed: November 1894
- Acquired: by US Government, 12 April 1898
- Commissioned: into US Navy, 11 April 1898
- Fate: Sunk by Spanish Navy, 2 June 1898

General characteristics
- Tonnage: 3,380 GRT, 2,193 NRT
- Length: 330.0 ft (100.6 m)
- Beam: 44.0 ft (13.4 m)
- Depth: 18.8 ft (5.7 m)
- Decks: 1
- Installed power: 289 NHP
- Propulsion: 1 × screw; 1 × triple-expansion steam engine
- Speed: 11.5 knots (21 km/h)

USS Merrimac, sometimes incorrectly spelt Merrimack, was a cargo steamship that was built in 1894 in England as Solveig for Norwegian owners, and renamed Merrimac when a US shipowner acquired her in 1897.

In 1898 Merrimac was commissioned into the United States Navy as a collier for the Spanish–American War. In June 1898 Spanish Navy ships sank her when she tried to trap them in the harbor of Santiago de Cuba. Merrimac is the only US ship that the Spanish Navy sank in that war.

== Solveig ==
CS Swan & Hunter built the ship in Wallsend on the River Tyne as yard number 194. She was launched on 29 September 1894 as Solveig, and completed her that November. Her registered length was 330.0 ft (100.6 m), her beam was 44.0 ft (13.4 m) and her depth was 18.8 ft (5.7 m). Her tonnages were 3,380 GRT and 2,193 NRT.

She had a single screw, driven by a three-cylinder triple-expansion steam engine built by North Eastern Marine Engineering of Wallsend. The engine was rated at 289 NHP and gave her a speed of 11.5 knots (21 km/h).

Solveig's first owner was Christian Michelsen & Co, who registered her in Bergen, Norway.

== Merrimac ==
On 9 December 1897 John N Robbins & co acquired Solveig, renamed her Merrimac, and registered her in New York. Ownership then passed to a Jefferson T Hogan, who on 12 April 1898 sold Merrimac to the United States Navy.

The ship was commissioned as USS Merrimac under the command of Cmdr JW Miller, fitted out at Norfolk Naval Shipyard as a naval collier. She joined the squadron of Commodore WS Schley off Cienfuegos, Cuba, on 20 May, and accompanied the squadron along the coast until it arrived off Santiago de Cuba on 26 May, where she bunkered several US warships.

== Action in Santiago Harbor ==
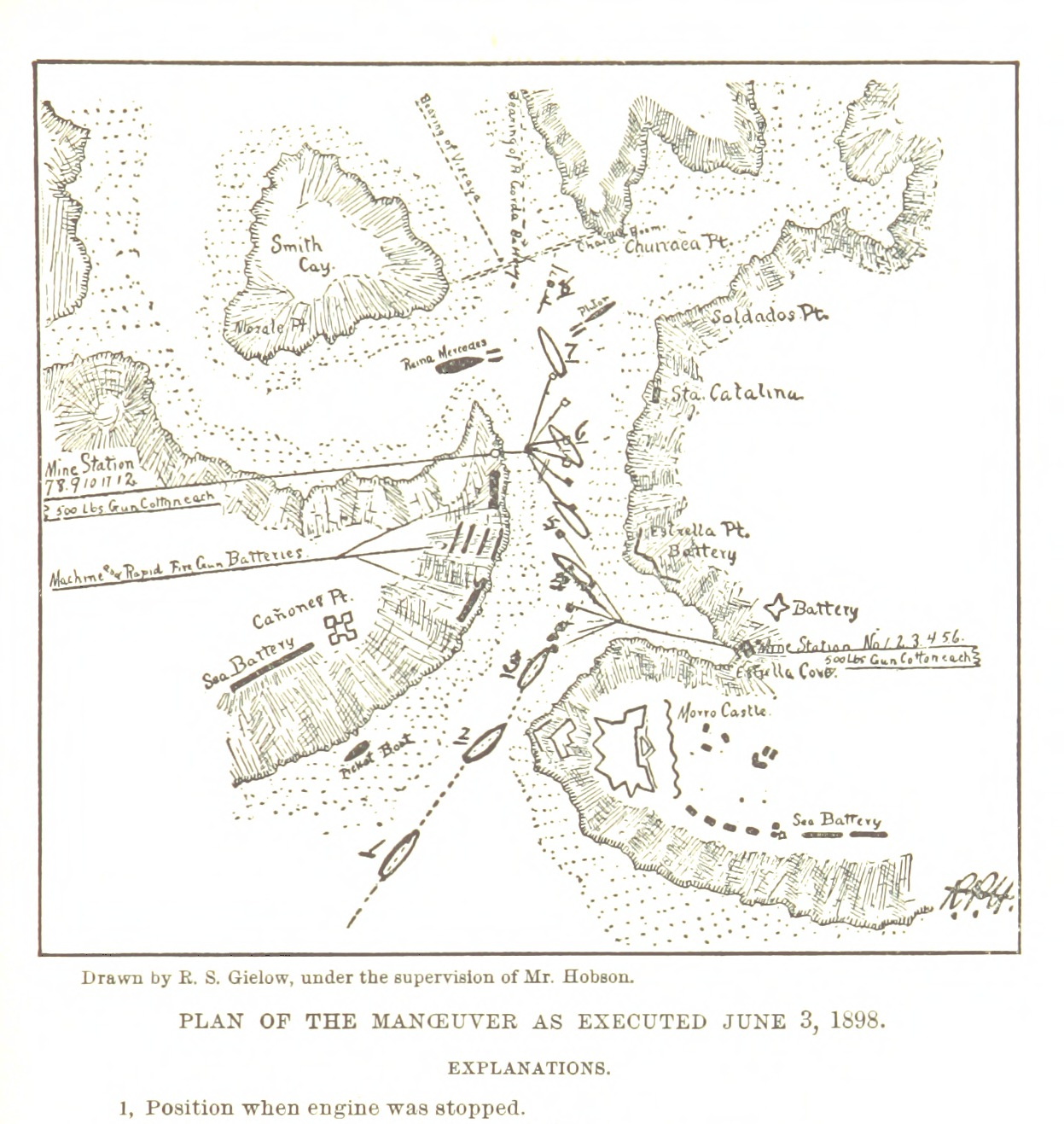
Plan of Santiago harbor, showing Merrimac's course, and the coastal batteries and spanish ships that bombarded her

A young Lieutenant, Richmond P. Hobson, devised a plan to scuttle Merrimac as a blockship to trap Spanish warships that were thought to be in Santiago harbor. Admiral William T. Sampson approved of his plan, and a skeleton crew of seven volunteers was selected: three from Merrimac's crew, three from the cruiser New York, and one from the battleship Iowa. Command of Merrimac was transferred from Commander Miller to Lieutenant Hobson.

It took two days of intense work to prepare Merrimac for her mission. An anchor was fitted to her stern to help to position her correctly to obstruct the harbor mouth. Ten improvised torpedoes were hung under her hull, to be electrically detonated simultaneously once Merrimac was in the correct position. Merrimac towed a dinghy, in which Hobson planned that he and his men would abandon ship. A launch from USS New York accompanied Merrimac as far as the harbor mouth, where it was to wait to pick up Hobson and his crew from the dinghy.

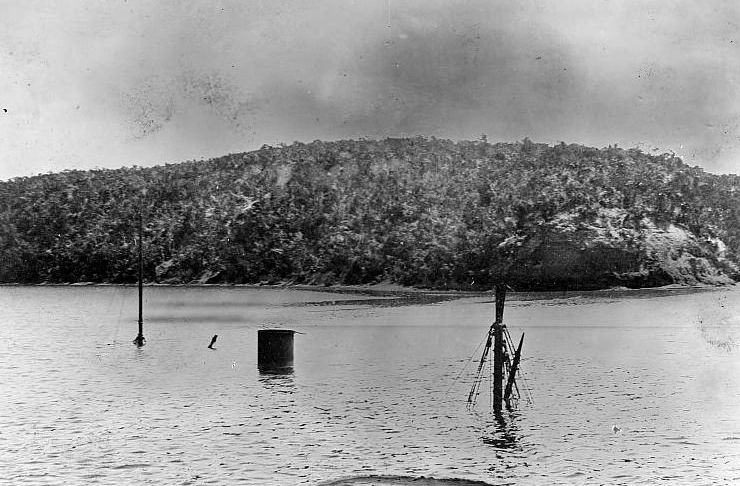
USS Merrimac's wreck in Santiago harbor

Merrimac reached the narrowest part of the channel, where he planned to scuttle her. But Spanish coastal artillery howitzers opened fire, and a shell disabled Merrimac's steering gear, which prevented Hobson and his crew from swinging her into position. Enemy fire also damaged some of the electric batteries that were meant to detonate the torpedoes. Hobson was able to detonate only three of the ten torpedoes, and these did not immediately sink her. A Spanish submarine mine tore a hole in her side, and she grounded on a promontory called Estrella Point. The American steamer was later sunk by the combined gunfire and the torpedoes of the protected cruiser Vizcaya, the unprotected cruiser Reina Mercedes, and the destroyer Pluton. She sank in a position that did not obstruct navigation. Hobson and all of his skeleton crew survived, and abandoned ship in the dinghy.

Spanish artillery fire drove off USS New York's launch, and at daybreak the Spanish Admiral, Pascual Cervera y Topete, came in his launch to rescue and capture Hobson and his crew. He congratulated his prisoners on their bravery. That afternoon Cervera sent his Chief of Staff, Captain Oviedo, under flag of truce to USS New York to tell Admiral Sampson that Hobson and all of his crew had been safely rescued and captured, that only two were wounded, and that Cervera admired their valor.

"¡Bien, muy bien! ¡Sois unos valientes! ¡Os felicito!"
"Good, very good! You are brave! I congratulate you!"

— Spanish admiral Pascual Cervera congratulating the American prisoners after their failed attempt,

Hobson and his crew were held as prisoners of war first in Morro Castle, and then in Santiago. Hobson was kept prisoner in the barracks, and his men were held in the hospital. A month later, on 3 July 1898, the US Navy destroyed the Spanish fleet in the Battle of Santiago de Cuba. On 6 July, Hobson and his seven crewmen were all released in a prisoner exchange. Each was awarded the Medal of Honor.

== Skeleton crew ==
The eight volunteer crewman of the Merrimac were:

- Lieutenant Richmond P. Hobson
- Coxswain Claus K. R. Clausen (USS New York)
- Coxswain Osborn W. Deignan (USS Merrimac)
- Coxswain John E. Murphy (USS Iowa)
- Chief Master-At-Arms Daniel Montague (USS New York)
- Gunner's Mate First Class George Charette (USS New York)
- Machinist First Class George F. Phillips (USS Merrimac)
- Watertender Francis Kelly (USS Merrimac)
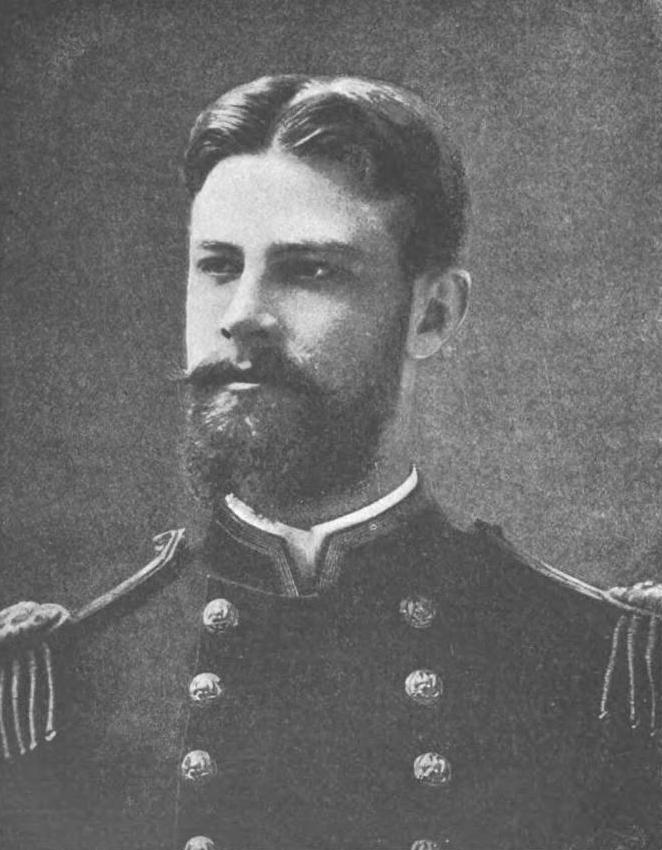
Richmond Hobson

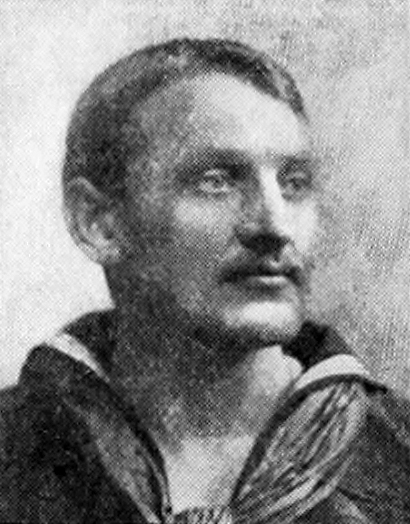
Claus Clausen

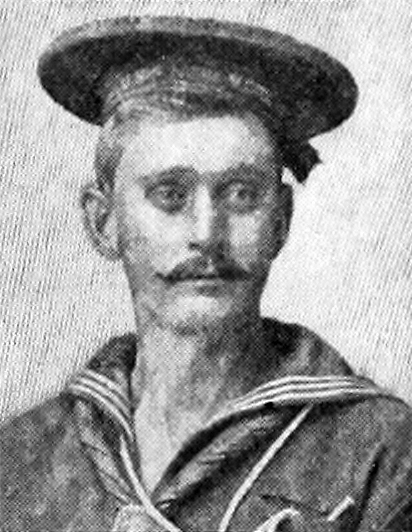
Osborn Deignan

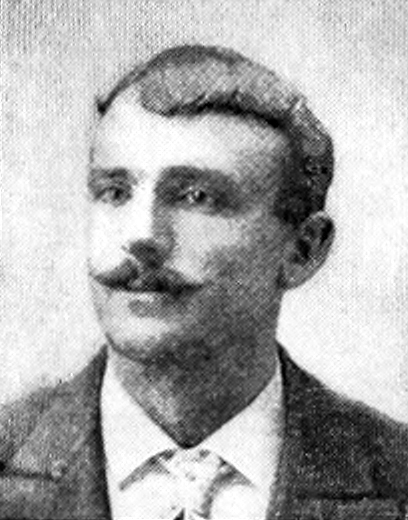
John E Murphy

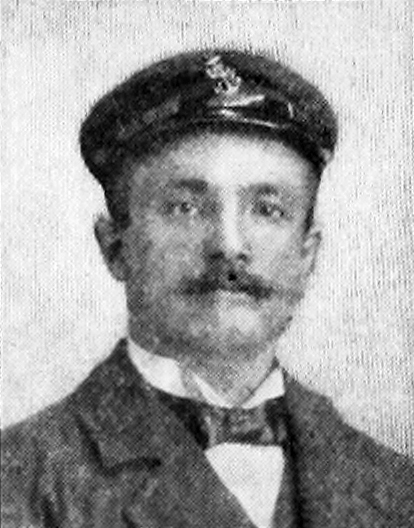
Daniel Montague

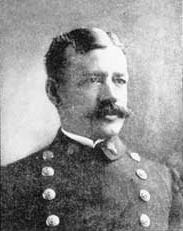
George Charrette

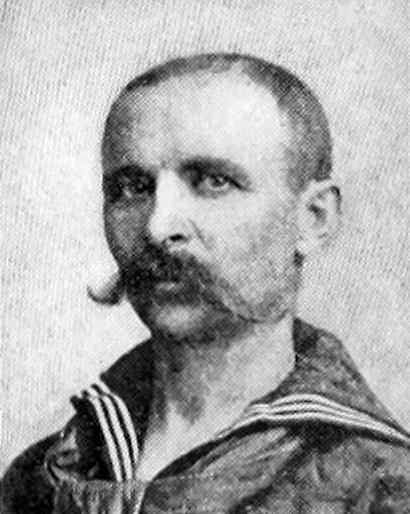
George F Phillips

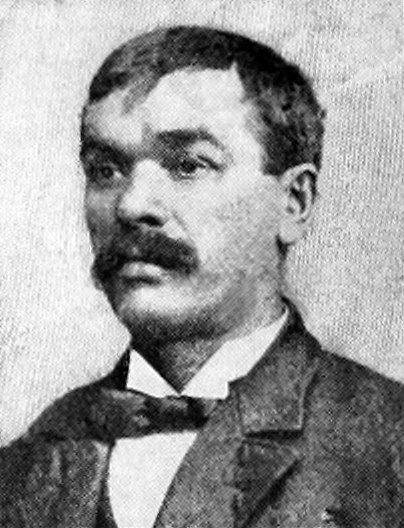
Francis Kelly

== Bibliography ==
- Hobson, Richmond Pearson (1899). The Sinking of the Merrimac. Classics of Naval Literature. Annapolis, MD: Naval Institute Press. ISBN 0-87021-632-5.
- Lloyd's Register of British and Foreign Shipping. Vol. I.–Steamships. London: Lloyd's Register of Shipping. 1896 – via Internet Archive.
- Otis, James (1898). "VIII. Hobson and the Merrimac". The Boys of '98. Boston, CT: Dana Estes & Company. pp. 149–170 – via Project Gutenberg.
- Wiley, Edwin; Rines, Irving Everett (1915). "Chapter VI. 1898. Hobson and the Merrimack.". Lectures on the growth and development of the United States. Vol. 10. Washington, DC: American Educational Alliance. pp. 124–128 – via Internet Archive.
