= Daniel Montague =

United States Navy sailor (1867–1912)

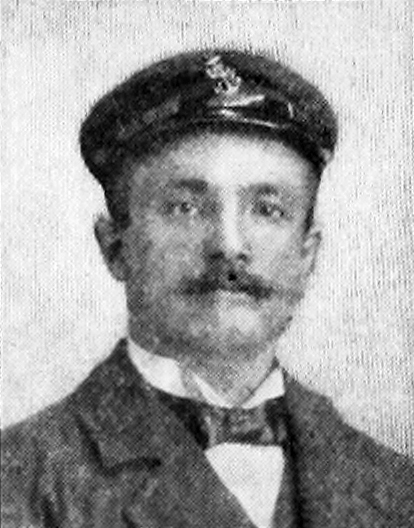
- Chief Boatswain Daniel Montague
- Born: October 22, 1867; Wicklow, Ireland
- Died: February 4, 1912 (aged 44)
- Burial place: United States Naval Academy Cemetery
- Military career
- Allegiance: United States of America
- Branch: United States Navy
- Service years: mid-1890s – 1912
- Rank: Chief Boatswain
- Units: USS New York (ACR-2); USS Merrimac; USS Wisconsin (BB-9); USS Mohican (1883); USS Olympia (C-6)
- Conflicts: Spanish–American War; Sinking of the Merrimac
- Awards: Medal of Honor

Daniel Montague (October 22, 1867 – February 4, 1912) was a United States Navy sailor and a recipient of America's highest military decoration—the Medal of Honor—for his actions in the Spanish–American War.

== Military career ==
Daniel Montague enlisted in the Navy during the mid-1890s and served in USS New York (ACR-2) during the Spanish–American War as a Chief Master-at-Arms. He was one of eight volunteer crew members of the collier USS Merrimac, which Rear Admiral William T. Sampson ordered sunk to block the entrance of Santiago Harbor, Cuba. On the night of June 2–3, 1898, during the attempt to execute this mission, Merrimac's steering gear was disabled by enemy gunfire, and she sank without obstructing navigation. Her crewmen were rescued by the Spanish and made prisoners-of-war. After the Battle of Santiago de Cuba destroyed the Spanish fleet a month later, Montague and his shipmates were released. For their actions during this operation, all eight men were awarded the Medal of Honor.

Montague was promoted to the warrant officer rank of Boatswain on June 15, 1898, while he was still in Spanish custody. His initial post-war assignment, to the training ship Lancaster, lasted from August 1898 to late in 1901. He then reported for duty at the U.S. Naval Academy, Annapolis, Maryland. In June 1903, Boatswain Montague reported on board the battleship USS Wisconsin, serving as Asiatic Station flagship.

Montague was promoted to Chief Boatswain in June 1904 and late in that year began service in the old steam sloop USS Mohican station ship at Olongapo, Philippines. In the summer of 1906 he was assigned duty at Naval Station, Pensacola, Florida, remaining there until the fall of 1909 when he was transferred to the Philadelphia Naval Yard, Pennsylvania. His last active assignment, in 1911–1912, was to the cruiser USS Olympia at Norfolk, Virginia, where she was being prepared for use as a barracks ship.

Daniel Montague died on active duty at age 44 or 45 and was buried at the U.S. Naval Academy Cemetery, Annapolis, Maryland.

== Medal of Honor citation ==
Rank and organization: Chief Master-at-Arms, U.S. Navy. Born: October 22, 1867, Wicklow, Ireland. G.O. No.: 529, November 2, 1899.

Citation:

In connection with the sinking of the U.S.S. Merrimac at the entrance to the harbor of Santiago de Cuba, June 2, 1898. Despite heavy fire from the Spanish batteries, Montague displayed extraordinary heroism throughout this operation.

== See also ==
- List of Medal of Honor recipients for the Spanish–American War
