= Claus Kristian Randolph Clausen =

American Navy officer

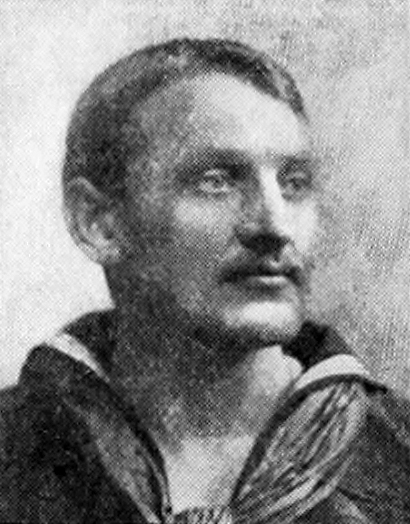
- Clausen in 1907
- Born: December 9, 1869; Denmark
- Died: December 23, 1958 (aged 89); St. Albans, New York
- Burial place: the U.S. Columbarium, Middle Village, New York
- Military career
- Allegiance: United States of America
- Branch: United States Navy
- Service years: 1898–1925
- Rank: Lieutenant
- Unit: USS Merrimac
- Conflicts: Spanish–American War; World War I
- Awards: Medal of Honor

Claus Kristian Randolph Clausen (December 9, 1869 – December 23, 1958) was an enlisted man and later an officer in the United States Navy. He received America's highest military decoration, the Medal of Honor, for actions in the Spanish–American War.

== Biography ==
Claus Kristian Randolph Clausen was born on December 9, 1869, in Denmark. Later enlisting in the Navy from the state of New York, he served on the USS New York during the Spanish–American War as a Coxswain. He was one of eight volunteer crew members of the collier USS Merrimac, which Rear Admiral William T. Sampson ordered sunk to block the entrance of Santiago Harbor, Cuba. On the night of June 2–3, 1898, during the attempt to execute this mission, Merrimac's steering gear was disabled by enemy gunfire, and she sank without obstructing navigation. Her crewmen were rescued by the Spanish and made prisoners-of-war. After the Battle of Santiago de Cuba destroyed the Spanish fleet a month later, Clausen and his shipmates were released. For his "extraordinary heroism" during this operation, he was awarded the Medal of Honor.

Clausen was promoted to the Warrant Officer rank of Boatswain on July 30, 1903. As an officer, his initial assignment was on the cruiser USS Detroit, operating in the Caribbean. Following this sea duty, he served two years on the New York Navy Yard's receiving ship USS Hancock. Boatswain Clausen's next time at sea was on the battleship USS Mississippi from 1908 to 1911. On July 30, 1909, while on Mississippi, he was promoted to Chief Boatswain. After another tour at the New York Navy Yard, from 1911 to 1914, Chief Boatswain Clausen obtained the special qualification of a "Master's License under Steamboat-Inspection Service" before reporting on board battleship USS New Jersey. He served in her during World War I and received a temporary promotions to Lieutenant, Junior Grade in May 1917 and Lieutenant on July 1, 1918.

After the war, Clausen transferred back to the New York Navy Yard and, in 1920, reverted to his permanent rank of Chief Boatswain. His next shipboard assignment was as an officer of USS Florida. In November 1922, he transferred to the Naval Torpedo Station, Newport, Rhode Island, and three months later reported on board the receiving ship USS Colorado at New York. Chief Boatswain Clausen was placed on the retired list on November 15, 1925. Though retired, he was promoted to Lieutenant in June 1930, but again reverted to Chief Warrant Officer 4 in the early 1950s. He lived his later years in Massapequa Park, New York, and at his death was the last surviving Medal of Honor recipient from the USS Merrimac mission of the Spanish–American War. Claus K. R. Clausen died on December 23, 1958, at St. Albans, New York and is interred in the U.S. Columbarium, Middle Village, New York.

== Medal of Honor citation ==
Rank and organization: Coxswain, U.S. Navy. Born: December 9, 1869, Denmark. Accredited to: New York. G.O. No.: 529, November 2, 1899.

Citation:

In connection with the sinking of the U.S.S. Merrimac at the entrance to the harbor of Santiago de Cuba, 2 June 1898. Despite heavy fire from the Spanish batteries, Clausen displayed extraordinary heroism throughout this operation.

== See also ==
- List of Medal of Honor recipients for the Spanish–American War
