= George Charrette =

United States Navy Medal of Honor recipient

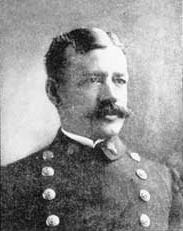
- Born: June 6, 1867; Lowell, Massachusetts
- Died: February 7, 1938 (aged 70); Lowell, Massachusetts
- Burial place: Arlington National Cemetery
- Military career
- Allegiance: United States of America
- Branch: United States Navy
- Service years: 1884–1925
- Rank: Lieutenant
- Conflicts: Spanish–American War
- Awards: Medal of Honor

George Charrette (June 6, 1867 – February 7, 1938) was an enlisted man and later officer in the United States Navy who received the Medal of Honor for his heroism during the Spanish–American War.

== Biography ==
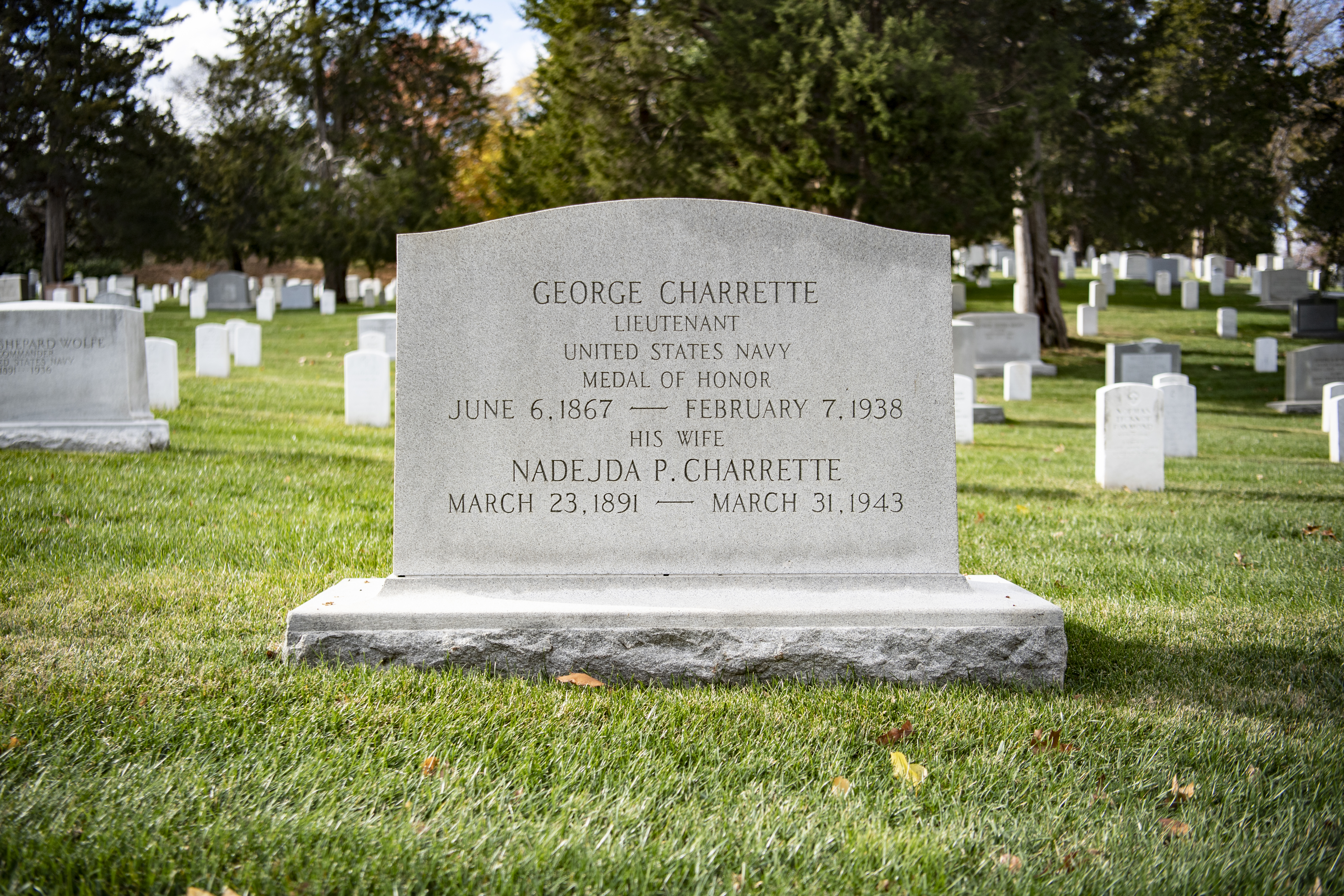
Grave at Arlington National Cemetery

Charrette was born in Lowell, Massachusetts, on June 6, 1867. He enlisted in the United States Navy September 24, 1884. As a Gunner's Mate third class, on June 2, 1898, he volunteered with seven others to sink USS Merrimac under heavy Spanish fire across the entrance to the harbor of Santiago, Cuba, thus bottling up the enemy fleet. Taken prisoner by the Spanish, Charrette was exchanged July 6, 1898. He was awarded the Medal of Honor for extraordinary heroism, although his name was misspelled as "George Charette" on the citation.

Charrette was warranted as a gunner on June 15, 1898, and was promoted to chief gunner on June 15, 1904. During World War I, he was commissioned lieutenant on July 1, 1918, and retired from the Navy in 1925.

He died February 7, 1938, in Lowell, Massachusetts, and was buried in Arlington National Cemetery, Arlington County, Virginia.

== Awards ==
- Sampson Medal
- Spanish Campaign Medal
- Victory Medal

== Namesake ==
In 1943, the destroyer USS Charrette (DD-581) was named in his honor.

== See also ==
- List of Medal of Honor recipients
- List of Medal of Honor recipients for the Spanish–American War
