= USS Charrette =

Fletcher-class destroyer

Coordinates: 37°56′03″N 23°41′05″E

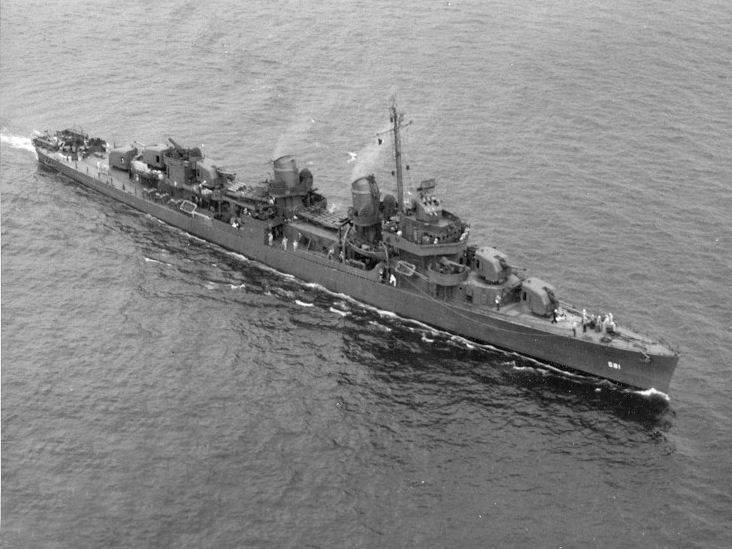
- USS Charrette at Boston, Massachusetts on 4 August 1943

History

United States
- Name: Charrette
- Namesake: George Charrette
- Builder: Boston Navy Yard
- Laid down: 20 February 1942
- Launched: 3 June 1942
- Sponsored by: Mrs. G. Charrette
- Commissioned: 18 May 1943
- Decommissioned: 15 January 1947
- Identification: DD-581
- Fate: Transferred to the Hellenic Royal Navy, 16 June 1959

Greece
- Name: Velos
- Acquired: 16 June 1959
- Out of service: 26 February 1991
- Stricken: 1 September 1975
- Identification: D16
- Status: Ceremonially active; museum ship in Palaio Faliro, Athens, and then in Thessaloniki.

General characteristics
- Class & type: Fletcher-class destroyer
- Displacement: 2,100 tons standard, 3,050 tons full load
- Length: 376 ft 6 in (114.76 m)
- Beam: 39 ft 8 in (12.09 m)
- Draft: 17 ft 9 in (5.4 m); with full load (including ASW dome): 20 ft 10 in (6.35 m)
- Propulsion: 60,000 shp (45,000 kW); 2 sets of General Electric geared steam turbines, 1 set of 3 for each shaft (cruising, low pressure, high pressure); 4 Foster Wheeler boilers (two furnaces each), maximum steam pressure: 525 psi (3,620 kPa), maximum steam temperature: 825 °F (441 °C); 2 propellers
- Speed: 35 knots (65 km/h; 40 mph)
- Range: 6,500 nautical miles (12,000 km; 7,500 mi) at 15 kn (28 km/h; 17 mph)
- Complement: United States Navy: 329; Hellenic Navy: 269
- Armament: 5 × Single 5 in (127 mm) guns; 4 × 40 mm AA guns, 4 × 20 mm AA guns, 10 × 21 inch (533 mm) torpedo tubes, 6 × depth charge projectors, 2 × depth charge tracks; (in Greek service); 4 × 127 mm (5 in)/38 cal. guns, 3 × twin 3 in (76 mm)/50 RF AA guns; 2× 12.7 mm (0.50 in) M2 Browning machine guns; 1 × quintuple 533 mm (21 in) torpedo tubes (for Mk 14 torpedoes), 2 × triple 325 mm (12.8 in) anti-submarine torpedo tubes (for Mk 44-Mk 46 torpedoes), 2 × Hedgehog (weapon) launchers (Mark 11, 24 bombs each), 1 × depth charge track for 12 Mk 9 depth charges, 12 (2×6) Super RBOC chaffs & flares launchers, 4 FIM-43 Redeye man-portable surface-to-air missiles (after 1976)

USS Charrette (DD-581), now called the Velos (D16) (Greek: Βέλος), is a museum ship located in Thessaloniki, Greece.

The USS Charrette was built as a Fletcher-class destroyer of the United States Navy, named for Lieutenant George Charrette (1867–1938), who was awarded the Medal of Honor for heroism during the Spanish–American War. Entering service during World War II, she was deployed in the Pacific Theater. Placed in reserve following the war, Charette was transferred to the Kingdom of Greece in 1959 and renamed Velos (D16), remaining in service until 1991 before being preserved as a museum ship at Palaio Faliro, Athens, and then moved to Thessaloniki in 2019.

== Service history ==
=== United States Navy ===
Charrette was launched on 3 June 1942 by the Boston Navy Yard, sponsored by Mrs. G. Charrette. The ship was commissioned on 18 May 1943.

Charrette sailed from New York City on 20 September 1943 to escort the aircraft carrier Monterey to Pacific service. Arriving at Pearl Harbor 9 October, Charrette took part in training exercises until 10 November, when she put to sea with Task Force 50, for air raids on Japanese bases in the Marshalls. These strikes neutralized enemy air opposition to the landings at Makin and on Tarawa, which followed. On 26 November, Charrette joined the screen of the task group assigned to air-cover operations over Makin and Tarawa, providing protection for the transports and supplying Naval Gunfire Support. Twelve days later, the destroyer screened battleships in a shore bombardment on Nauru, before rejoining the fast carrier task force sailing on to Efate. Charrette sailed on 21 December to screen the carriers as they launched strikes against Kavieng, New Ireland, during the three days preceding the assault on Cape Gloucester on 26 December. Continuing north, the group arrived at Funafuti on 21 January 1944 to prepare for the operations against the Marshall Islands.

==== 1944 ====
From 23 January to 5 February 1944, Charrette screened the carriers in a series of strikes on Kwajalein and Eniwetok. On the night of 4–5 February, Charrette left her station to investigate a radar contact reported by one of the battleships. After tracking the contact to 3,200 yards (2,900 m), she opened fire on a submarine, which crash dived. Charrette attempted a depth charge attack, then used her radar to guide the destroyer escort Fair to sink possibly I-175, the first Japanese submarine to be sunk by the Hedgehog, antisubmarine weapon. The next day, Charrette moored in Majuro Lagoon.

The destroyer sailed 12 February 1944 for the first of the series of raids sealing off the Japanese base at Truk from being an effective contribution to the Pacific War. After screening the carriers into position for their strikes, Charrette joined Task Group 50.9 in a sweep around the island on 17 February to catch Japanese shipping escaping air attacks. Katori, Maikaze, and a submarine chaser were sunk by the task group, which rejoined the carriers the next day.

After escorting an oiler fleet to Majuro, Charrette sailed for an overhaul at Pearl Harbor until 15 March 1944, when she put out to rejoin the carriers for attacks on Japanese ships retreating from Truk to the Palaus, preliminary to the New Guinea operation. Charrette assisted in fending off a Japanese air attack on 28 March, and continued her protective screening through 30 March and 1 April strikes. The carriers returned to Majuro on 6 April and sailed a week later to strike at airfields and defenses on New Guinea and to provide direct support to the landings at Humboldt Bay on 22 April. After replenishing at Manus, Charrette sailed on with the carriers to screen strikes against Truk on 29 April and to guard the force's battleships as they pounded a bombardment at Ponape on 1 May.

Charrette's next contribution came during the Marianas operation, for which she sailed 6 June 1944. She supported the carriers in their strikes on Guam, Saipan, and Rota from the 11 through to 14 June, then turned north for strikes against the aircraft on Iwo Jima for attacks against the American landings on Saipan. As the carriers came into position on 15 June, scouting aircraft spotted the 1,900-ton freighter Tatsutakwa Maru, and Charrette, with the destroyer Boyd, intercepted and sank the Japanese ship, recovering 112 survivors. After successful strikes, Charrette's group sailed south to concentrate with the Fast Carrier Task Force (then TF 58) to meet the Japanese naval force known to be coming out. The air Battle of the Philippine Sea broke on the morning of 19 June, and Charrette continued her screening, antiaircraft and guard duties throughout the two days of action that severely diminished the remaining Japanese naval aviation threat. On the night of 20 June, she participated in a night recovery of the last strikes, flashing beacon lights and rescuing aviators who were forced to ditch through lack of fuel. On 21 June, the carrier force steamed back to cover the invasion forces in the Marianas, Guam, and Rota, and later the bases in the Pagan Islands and on Chichi Jima. Charrette fired in the bombardment of Chichi Jima on 5 August, then returned to Eniwetok.

Charrette sailed from Eniwetok on 29 August 1944 for airstrikes of early September against targets in the Palaus and the Philippines, which paved the way for the invasion of Peleliu and marked the beginning of the return to the Philippines. In preparation for the invasion of Leyte, the carrier task force sailed again on 4 October for strikes designed to neutralize Japanese airfields on Okinawa, northern Luzon, and Formosa during the assaults in the Philippines. On 12 October, she began the most important part of these strikes, against Formosa, which provoked return attacks by Japanese aircraft on the carrier forces. Charrette aided in shooting down attacking aircraft during raids in which the cruisers Canberra and Houston were hit. Charrette joined the screen that guarded the damaged ships during their retreat from enemy air attack, before rejoining her carrier group for the journey north to intercept the approaching Japanese force, beginning her part in the Battle for Leyte Gulf. The carriers she guarded launched strikes at the Japanese northern force in the Battle off Cape Engaño on 25 October.

Charrette replenished at Ulithi from 29 October to 2 November 1944, then joined the screen of the fast carriers for strikes on Luzon airfields early in November, which reduced enemy air opposition at the Leyte beachhead. Charrette returned to Manus on 30 November to prepare for the Lingayen Gulf operation.

==== 1945 ====
Charrette supported the landings at Lingayen from 4 to 18 January, then guarded the approach and withdrawal of reinforcement convoys into Lingayen Gulf. She left the Philippines on 2 February, and on 25 February, arrived at the Puget Sound Navy Yard for another overhaul. She returned to action in June, beginning a month of support for the Borneo operations, followed by patrol duty in the Netherlands East Indies. On 2 August, the destroyer Conner and she made contact with a ship, which they tracked through the night, finding in the morning that it was the hospital ship Tachibana Maru. A boarding party from Charrette found ordnance, contraband, and able-bodied troops, who were taken prisoners of war. Charrette and Conner brought Tachibana Maru into Morotai 6 August.

Charrette cleared Morotai on 13 August 1945, and called at Subic Bay before reporting at Buckner Bay, Okinawa, in September for duty escorting ships with occupation troops, equipment, and supplies for Chinese ports. She sailed from Shanghai on 12 December for San Francisco, California, which she reached 30 December. Charrette was placed in commission in reserve at San Diego on 4 March 1946, and was taken out of commission and placed in reserve on 15 January 1947. In June 1959, she was transferred to Greece.

=== Hellenic Navy ===
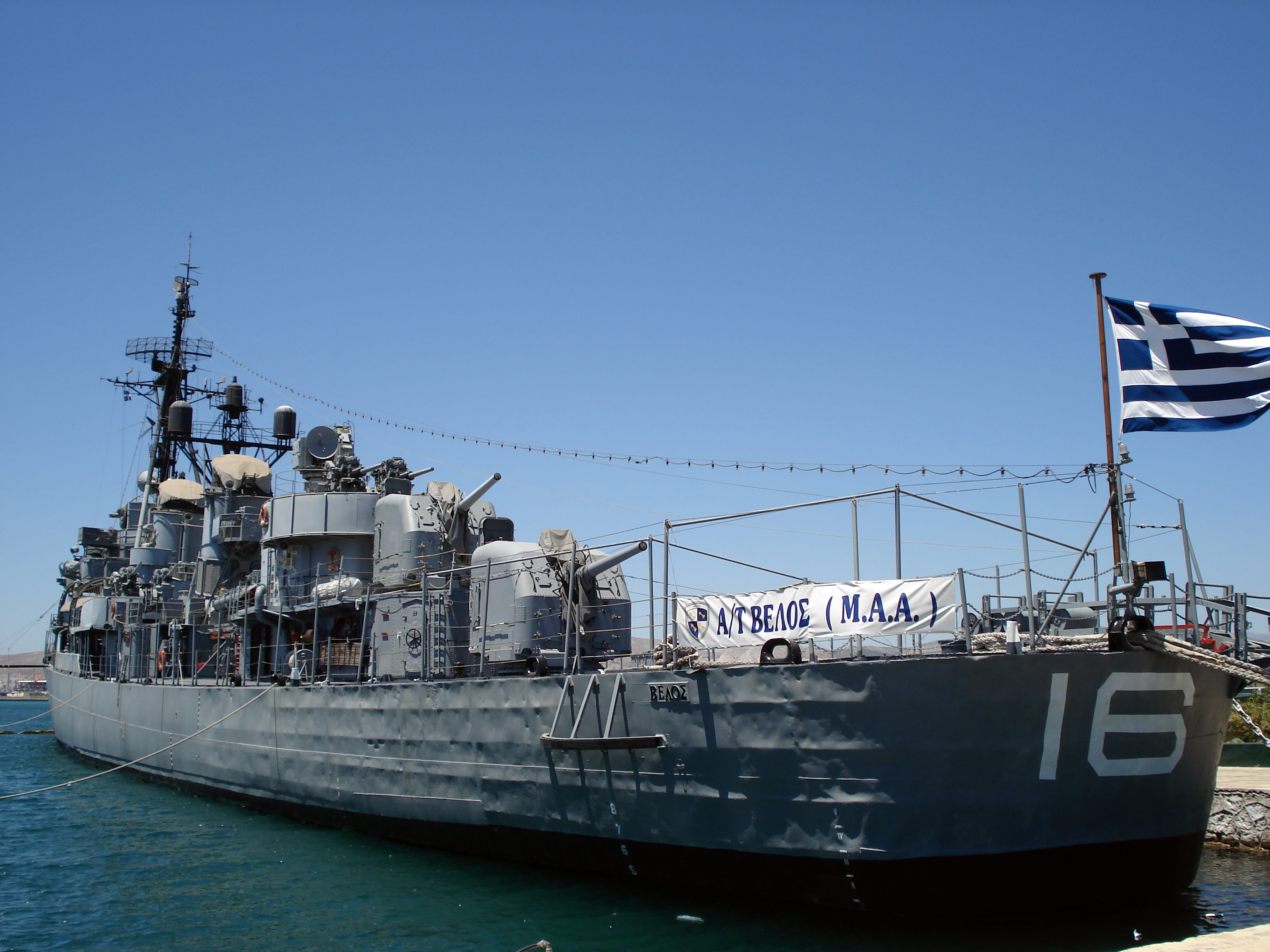
Velos (D16) as a naval museum in the Gulf of Faliro in Athens, 3 June 2006, 64 years after her launch

The ship was accepted by Commander G. Moralis, RHN, on 16 July 1959 in Long Beach, California, and arrived in Greece on 15 October 1959. It served in the Hellenic Navy as Velos (D16) (Greek: Βέλος, "Arrow"). Velos took part in almost every Greek and NATO exercise and actively participated in the crises with Turkey of the years 1964, 1967, 1974 (Cyprus crisis), and 1987.

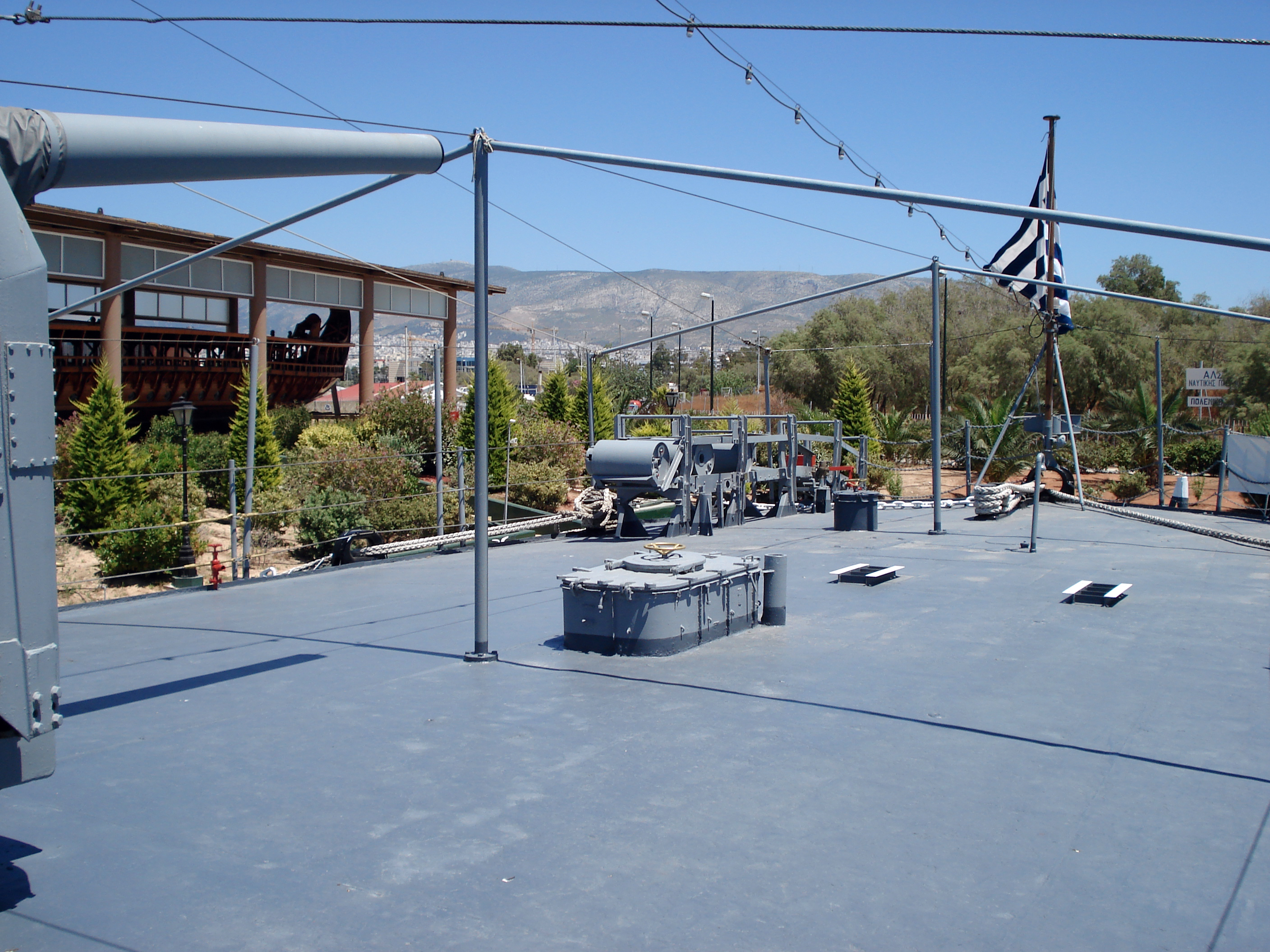
Velos on 3 June 2006, view to stern: The aft 127 mm (5 in) gun and depth charge track can be seen. There, Commander Pappas declared his allegiance to democracy, in the background the reconstructed Olympias trireme.

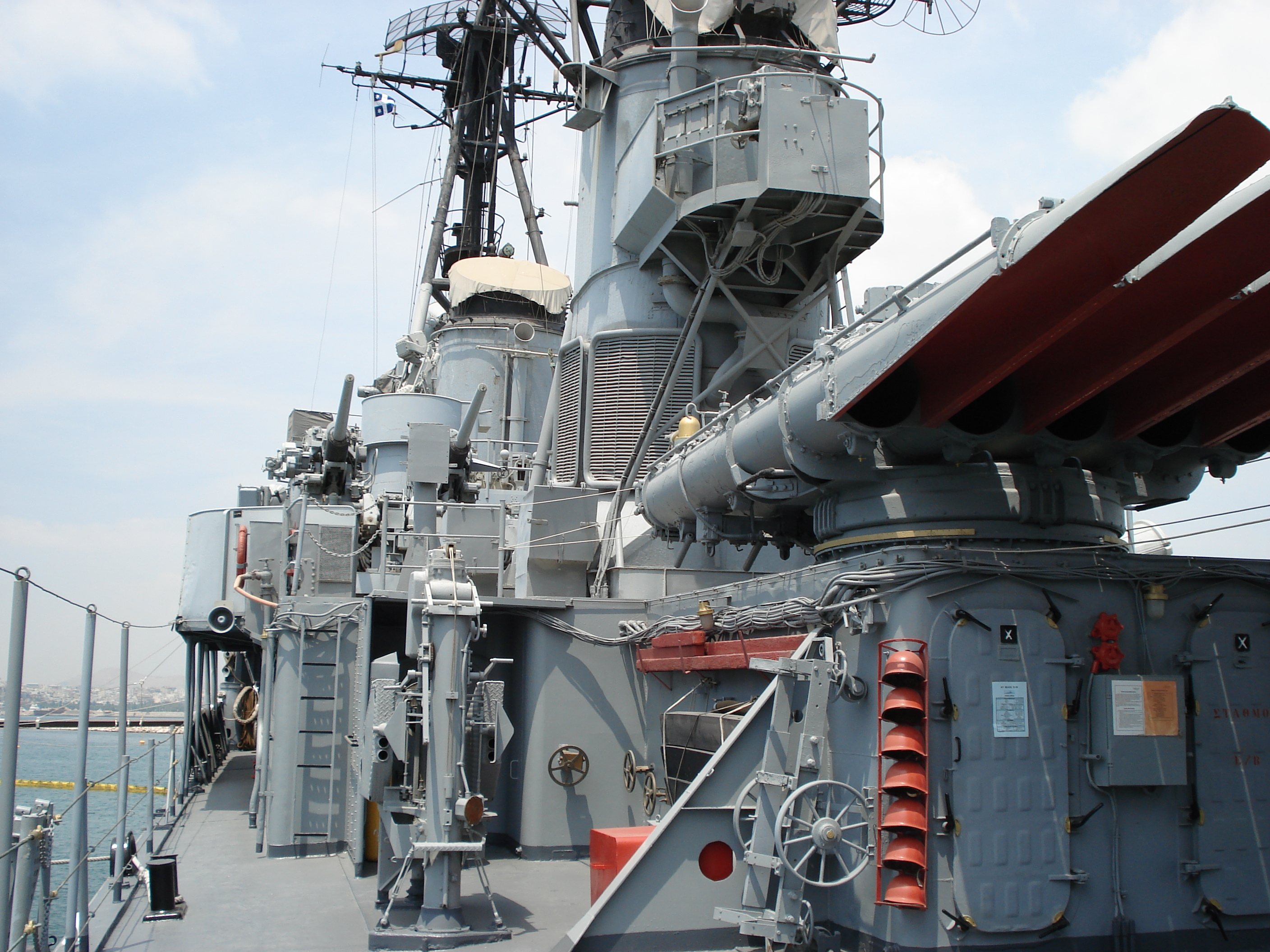
Velos on 20 May 2006: Amidships view to bow and bridge, the 533 mm (21 in) torpedo tubes and 76 mm (3 in) AA guns can be seen. Note the rank flag flown at the foremast displacing downward the commissioning pennant revealing that the ship is regarded as in commission.

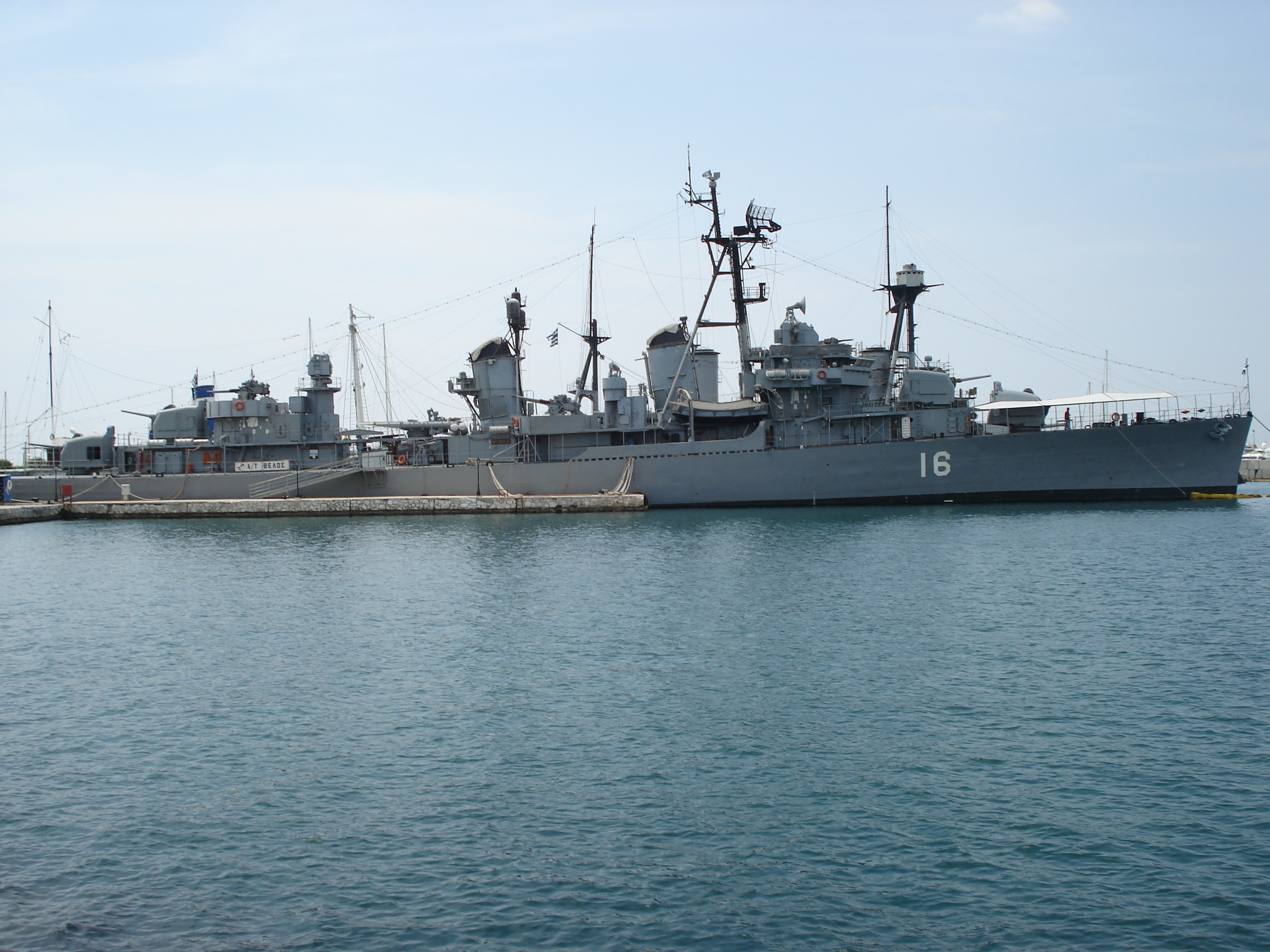
Velos as a museum in the Gulf of Faliro in Athens, 20 May 2006

==== Mutiny ====
On 25 May 1973, Velos, under the command of Nikolaos Pappas, while participating in a NATO exercise and to protest against the dictatorship in Greece, anchored at Fiumicino, Italy, and refused to return to Greece.

When in patrol with other NATO vessels between Italy and Sardinia (85 nautical miles (157 km) southwest of Rome) at midday on 25 May 1973, the captain and the officers had learned by radio that naval officers had been arrested and tortured in Greece. Commander Pappas was in a group of democratic officers who were loyal to their oath to obey the Constitution and planned to act against the junta. Pappas knew the arrested officers opposed the junta and realized no further hope existed for a movement inside Greece. He decided to act alone to motivate global public opinion.

Pappas mustered the crew on the stern and announced his decision, which was received with enthusiasm. Pappas signaled his intentions to the commander of the squadron and NATO Headquarters, quoting the preamble of the North Atlantic Treaty (founding treaty for NATO), which declares, "all governments ... are determined to safeguard the freedom, common heritage, and civilization of their peoples, founded on the principles of democracy, individual liberty, and the rule of law." Leaving formation, he sailed for Rome.

That afternoon, the ship anchored about 3.5 nautical miles (6.5 km) off the coast at Fiumicino, and three officers (Ensigns K. Gortzis, K. Matarangas, and G. Stratos) went ashore in a whaleboat. From Fiumicino Airport, they telephoned the international press agencies to inform them of the situation in Greece and the presence of the destroyer. They arranged for a press conference to be held the next day by Commander Pappas. This action sparked international interest in the situation in Greece. The captain, six officers, and 25 petty officers requested asylum and remained in Italy as political refugees. Initially, the entire crew wished to follow their captain (170 men signed a request), but they were advised (and some ordered) by their officers to remain on board because of the fear of retaliation by the regime against their families. The men were told to return to Greece and to inform their families and friends about what had happened. Velos returned to Greece a month later with a replacement crew. After the fall of the junta on (24 July 1974), some of the officers returned to the navy. Commander Pappas reached the rank of vice admiral and served as the chief of the Hellenic Navy General Staff from 1982 to 1986.

Velos was decommissioned on 26 February 1991, having sailed 362,622 nautical miles (671,576 km; 417,298 mi) in her 48-year career.

=== Preservation ===
In 1994, the Hellenic Navy General Staff declared her a Museum of the Struggle against the Dictatorship (Greek: Μουσείο Αντιδικτατορικού Αγώνα). The ship, then anchored at Poros Naval Base, was transferred on 14 December 2000 to Salamis Naval Base for maintenance and restoration work to be converted into a visitable naval museum. From 26 June 2002 until 9 September 2019, she was anchored in the Naval Tradition Park at Palaio Faliro, Athens. Since 9 September 2019, Velos has been anchored on the waterfront of Thessaloniki, close to the city's Concert Hall, and is available to visit. Velos is regarded as still in commission.

On 19 November 2023, strong winds and waves caused damage to Velos' stern at her moorings. She was towed to the city's harbor later the same day.

== Awards ==
Charrette received 13 battle stars for her World War II service.

== In popular culture ==
The ship is featured in the video game World of Warships published by Wargaming. She is depicted in her condition during the 1973 mutiny. She was the 5th Fletcher-class destroyer introduced into the game, after Fletcher, Erben (as Chung Mu), Kidd, and Black.
