= USS Fair =

Evarts-class destroyer escort of the United States Navy

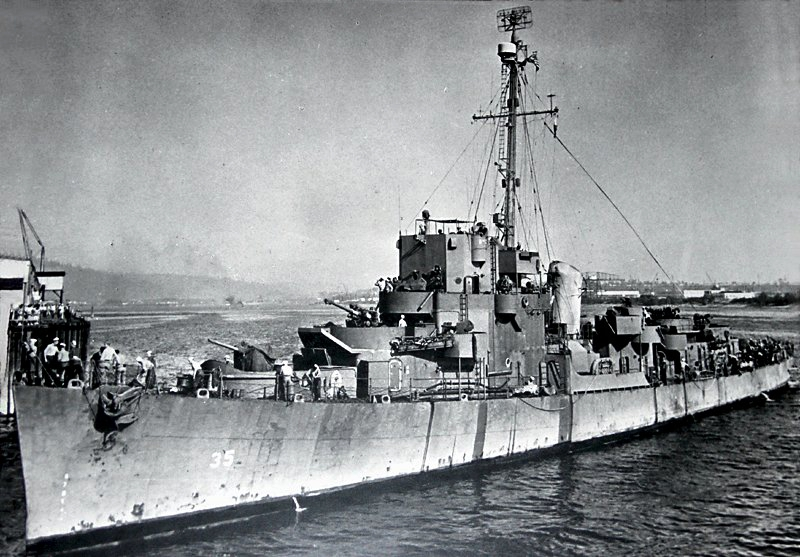
- Fair c. 1944

History

United States
- Name: Fair
- Builder: Mare Island Navy Yard
- Laid down: 24 February 1943
- Launched: 27 July 1943
- Commissioned: 23 October 1943
- Decommissioned: 17 November 1945
- Stricken: 28 November 1945
- Fate: Transferred to the Army on 20 May 1947 for loan to Canada, returned to USN in 1948 and scrapped in 1949

General characteristics
- Class & type: Evarts class destroyer escort
- Displacement: 1,140 (standard), 1,430 tons (full)
- Length: 283 ft 6 in (86.41 m) (waterline), 289 ft 5 in (88.21 m) (overall))
- Beam: 35 ft 2 in (10.72 m)
- Draft: 11 ft 0 in (3.35 m) (max)
- Propulsion: 4 General Motors Model 16-278A diesel engines with electric drive; 6000 shp; 2 screws
- Speed: 21 kn (39 km/h)
- Range: 4,150 nm
- Complement: 15 officers, 183 enlisted
- Armament: 3 × 3 in (76 mm) cal Mk 22 (1×3) dual-purpose guns, 4 × 1.1-inch/75-caliber gun(4×1), 9 × Oerlikon 20 mm Mk 4 AA cannons, 1 × Hedgehog Projector Mk 10 (144 rounds), 8 × Mk 6 depth charge projectors, 2 × Mk 9 depth charge tracks

USS Fair (DE-35) was an Evarts-class destroyer escort of the United States Navy.

== Design ==
The Evarts-class destroyer escorts were 289 ft 5 in (88.21 m) long overall, and they had a beam of 35 ft 2 in (10.72 m). They had an average draft of 10 ft 1 in (3.07 m) at their full load displacement of 1,416 long tons (1,439 t). Each ship had a normal crew numbered 156 officers and sailors.

Fair was propelled by a pair of diesel motors manufactured by General Motors, which drove a pair of screw propellers. Her propulsion system was rated to produce 6,000 brake horsepower (4,500 kW) for a top speed of 19.5 knots (36.1 km/h; 22.4 mph). Oil storage amounted to between 131 and 197 long tons (133 and 200 t), which allowed a cruising radius of up to 6,000 nautical miles (11,000 km; 6,900 mi) at an economical pace of 10 knots (19 km/h; 12 mph).

The ship's armament consisted of a main battery of three 3-inch (76 mm) /50-caliber guns in individual pivot mounts, which could be used against air or surface targets. These were supported by a light anti-aircraft battery that initially consisted of four 1.1 in (28 mm) /75-caliber guns in a quadruple mount and nine 20 mm (0.79 in) Oerlikon guns. For attacks against submarines, the ship was equipped with a Hedgehog mortar, eight depth charge throwers, and two depth charge racks.

== Service history ==
Fair was named for Victor Fair, a naval officer killed aboard USS Gregory on 5 September 1942 during the Guadalcanal campaign. The ship was launched on 27 July 1943 by Mare Island Navy Yard and was sponsored by the widow of the namesake. The ship was commissioned on 23 October 1943.

Fair escorted a convoy from San Francisco to Pearl Harbor, where she arrived on 9 January 1944. She put to sea nine days later to conduct an antisubmarine patrol off Tarawa, and late on 4 February, joined Charrette to develop a contact previously made by the destroyer. Attacks by both ships led to the sinking of what was probably Japanese submarine I-175 the next morning. Fair returned to Pearl Harbor on 17 February, and sailed on 25 February for Majuro, where from 5 March – 12 June, she patrolled the entrance to the lagoon, and escorted ships to and from ocean rendezvous and Roi Namur. On 14 June, she arrived at Eniwetok with three oilers, and for the next 2 weeks, screened them in the fueling area off the Mariana Islands as they fueled ships serving in the assault and capture of Saipan.

The escort vessel served on patrol out of Eniwetok from 1–14 July, then returned to screen the logistics group during the assaults on Tinian and Guam. She returned to Pearl Harbor on 31 August for a brief overhaul and to take part in training operations. On 13 October, Fair was back at Eniwetok for duty escorting convoys to Ulithi until 19 January 1945. She continued her escort duty from Eniwetok to Manus, Guam, and Guadalcanal until 24 March, when she arrived at Ulithi to stage for the assault on Okinawa.

Guarding a convoy composed primarily of LSTs, Fair put out from Ulithi on 27 March, and after the initial assault on 1 April, put into Kerama Retto. On 6 April, before getting underway for Saipan with unladen transports, she fired on the massive wave of kamikazes which attacked shipping off the island, splashing one. After her voyage to Saipan, Fair patrolled off Chimu Wan, Okinawa until 12 May, then screened the transport area, firing on attacking aircraft and suicide boats for 10 days. Her next assignment was a convoy escort voyage to Saipan and Guam, returning to Okinawa on 10 June for local escort duty and patrol.

Fair cleared Okinawa on 5 July 1945 for a West Coast overhaul. She was decommissioned at Portland, Oregon on 17 November, and transferred to the United States Army on 20 May 1947.

== Awards ==
- Combat Action Ribbon (retroactive)
- American Campaign Medal
- Asiatic–Pacific Campaign Medal (with five service stars)
- World War II Victory Medal
