= Osborn Deignan =

Osborn Warren Deignan
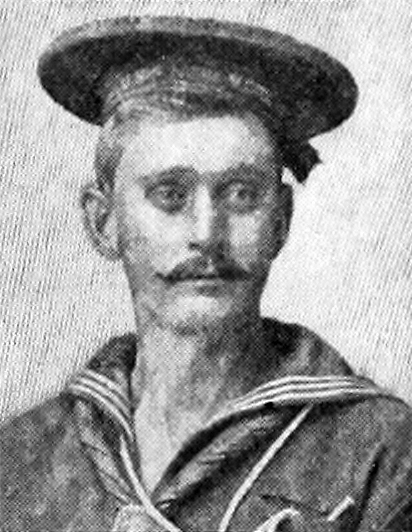
- Coxswain Osborn W. Deignan
- Born: February 24, 1877; Stuart, Iowa, U.S.
- Died: April 16, 1916 (aged 39); Cañon City, Colorado, U.S.
- Burial place: Forest Lawn Memorial Park, Glendale, California, U.S.
- Military career
- Allegiance: United States of America
- Branch: United States Navy
- Service years: 1894–1906
- Rank: Boatswain
- Unit: USS Merrimac
- Conflicts: Spanish–American War: Sinking of the Merrimac
- Awards: Medal of Honor

Osborn Warren Deignan (February 24, 1877 – April 16, 1916) was an enlisted sailor and later a Warrant Officer in the United States Navy. He received his country's highest military decoration—the Medal of Honor—for actions in the Spanish–American War. Born in Iowa, he joined the Navy in 1894 and participated in the Battle of Santiago de Cuba, the largest naval engagement of the Spanish–American War. Deignan and seven others attempted to block the entrance to Santiago Harbor, Cuba but the Spanish destroyed their ship before they could accomplish their mission, and took them prisoner. The men were later released and Deignan received the Medal of Honor for his actions. He went on to become an officer and served in various posts and ships throughout the Navy until retiring in 1906. He died in Colorado in 1916, and was buried in California.

== Early life ==
Deignan was born February 24, 1877, near Stuart, Iowa, to John Deignan and his wife. His father had also been a sailor, serving in the Navy during the American Civil War, and afterwards went to work for the Rock Island Railway as a conductor. When Osborn was five years old, a tornado struck his father's train in Grinnell, Iowa, killing him and leaving Osborn, his mother, his brother, and his sister, to survive on their own. His mother remarried and the family, along with two additional children from his new stepfather, moved to North Tremont Street in Stuart. In 1887 he left school and went to sea, serving on ships in the Atlantic, the Arctic and the Caribbean.

== Military career ==
Deignan enlisted in the United States Navy from his home state of Iowa, originally on December 7, 1894. He served on numerous USN vessels between 1894 and 1896 and, having deserted from the USS Newark on May 6, 1896 (as per naval records maintained by the Military Record Center) then re-enlistment in 1898 (as per naval records maintained by the Military Record Center.) He was assigned as a Coxswain to the USS Merrimac (1898) during the Spanish–American War. The Merrimac had frequent problems with the steering and engines, and Deignan referred to it as "cranky". After a short time on the ship, he garnered a reputation as an able helmsman and was preferred when delivering coal to the other ships in the fleet, a task that could be difficult in a ship that was already hard to control.

When Rear Admiral William T. Sampson requested volunteers for an extremely dangerous mission, there were more than enough volunteers, but he chose Osborn as the helmsman. The mission was to sink Merrimac at the entrance to Santiago Harbor, Cuba in an effort to block it and pen the Spanish Navy in the harbor. Seven other members of the crew were also chosen for the assignment. While the crew was attempting to fulfill its mission, Spanish forces fired on the ship and, in the process, disabled the Merrimac's steering controls before the crew could complete their task.

The ship sank without obstructing navigation, but the crew was able to escape the ship before she went under. They were rescued by the Spanish and were taken as prisoners-of-war. A month later the Spanish fleet was destroyed at the Battle of Santiago de Cuba and the crewman were released. For his "extraordinary heroism" during the operation, Deignan was awarded the Medal of Honor.

On April 9, 1900, Deignan was promoted to the Warrant Officer rank of Boatswain. As an officer, his initial assignments were in the Philippines, first at Manila, then at the Naval Station, Cavite. After meeting her at a party in 1898, he married Maud Huntoon on May 14, 1902, and together they had a daughter. In June 1902, he reported for duty on the USS Oregon (BB-3) and later that year transferred to the receiving ship USS Independence (1814), at the Mare Island Naval Shipyard, California. He was stationed at Navy Yard, Pensacola, Florida, from 1903–04, and then was assigned to the receiving ship USS Franklin (1864), at Norfolk, Virginia. He remained there for less than a year before reporting for his last tour of duty on the monitor USS Amphitrite (BM-2) in April 1905. He retired on April 21, 1906, and moved to the Los Angeles area.

== Death and legacy ==
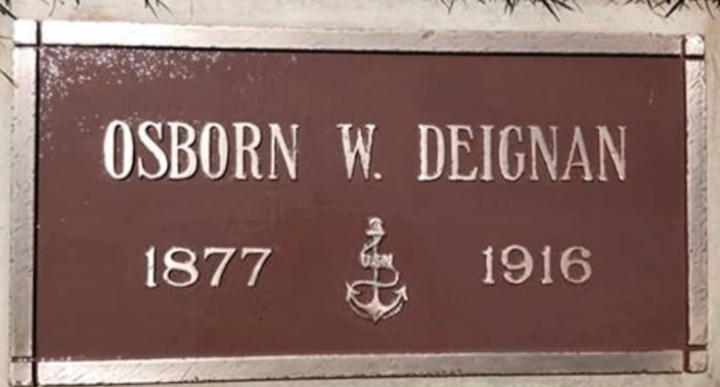

Deignan died on April 16, 1916, in Cañon City at the age of 39 and was buried with full military honors at Forest Lawn Memorial Park, Glendale, California.

Post #1842 of the Veterans of Foreign Wars was named in his honor.

== Awards ==
- Medal of Honor
- Sampson Medal
- Spanish Campaign Medal
- Philippine Campaign Medal

=== Medal of Honor citation ===
Rank and organization: Coxswain, U.S. Navy. Born: February 24, 1873, Stuart, Iowa. Accredited to: Iowa. G.O. No.: 529, November 2, 1899.

Citation:

In connection with the sinking of the U.S.S. Merrimac at the entrance to the harbor of Santiago de Cuba, 2 June 1898. Despite heavy fire from the Spanish batteries, Deignan displayed extraordinary heroism throughout this operation.

== See also ==
- List of Medal of Honor recipients for the Spanish–American War
