= USS Greiner =

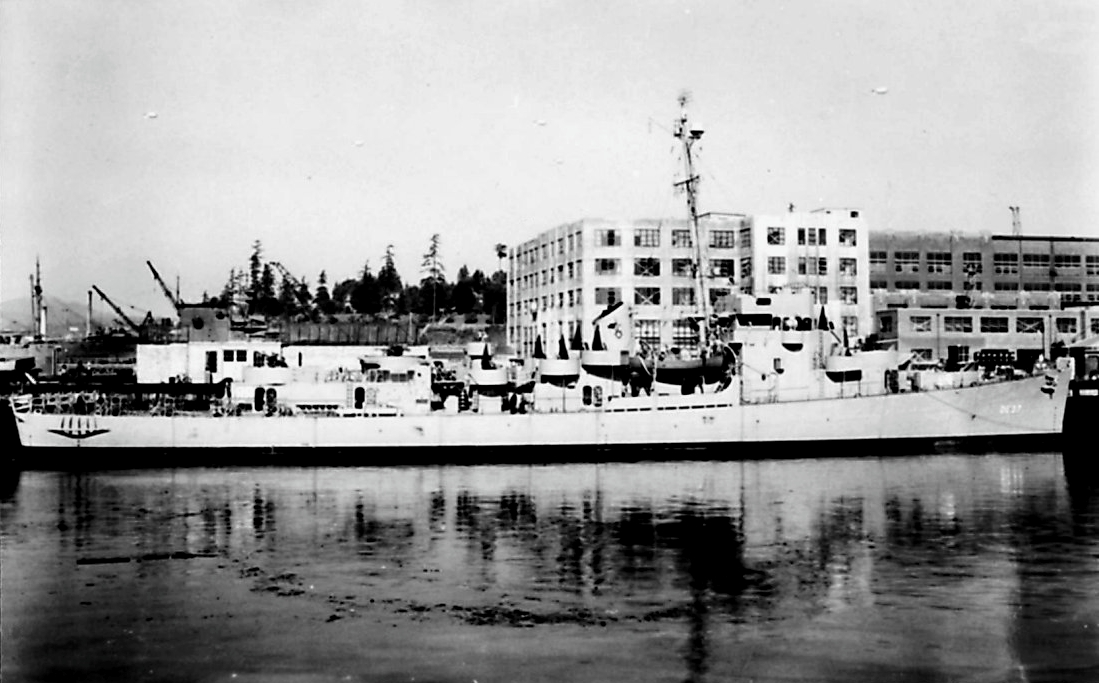
- Greiner on 15 August 1943

History

United States
- Name: USS Greiner (DE-37)
- Builder: Puget Sound Navy Yard, Bremerton, Washington
- Laid down: 7 September 1942
- Launched: 20 May 1943 as BDE-37
- Commissioned: 18 August 1943 as USS Greiner (DE-37)
- Decommissioned: 19 November 1945
- Stricken: 5 December 1945
- Fate: Sold for scrap on 10 February 1946

General characteristics
- Class & type: Evarts class destroyer escort
- Displacement: 1,140 (standard), 1,430 tons (full)
- Length: 283 ft 6 in (86.41 m) (waterline), 289 ft 5 in (88.21 m) (overall))
- Beam: 35 ft 2 in (10.72 m)
- Draft: 11 ft 0 in (3.35 m) (max)
- Propulsion: 4 General Motors Model 16-278A diesel engines with electric drive; 6,000 shp; 2 screws
- Speed: 19 kn (35 km/h)
- Range: 4,150 nm
- Complement: 15 officers, 183 enlisted
- Armament: 3 × 3 in (76 mm) cal Mk 22 dual purpose guns (1×3), 4 × 1.1"/75 caliber guns (1×4), 9 × Oerlikon 20 mm Mk 4 AA cannons, 1 × Hedgehog Projector Mk 10 (144 rounds), 8 × Mk 6 depth charge projectors, 2 × Mk 9 depth charge tracks

USS Greiner (DE-37) was an Evarts-class destroyer escort constructed for the United States Navy during World War II. She was promptly sent off into the Pacific Ocean to protect convoys and other ships from Japanese submarines and fighter aircraft. She performed dangerous work in numerous battle areas, and was awarded three battle stars.

== Design ==
The Evarts-class destroyer escorts were 289 ft 5 in (88.21 m) long overall, and they had a beam of 35 ft 2 in (10.72 m). They had an average draft of 10 ft 1 in (3.07 m) at their full load displacement of 1,416 long tons (1,439 t). Each ship had a normal crew numbered 156 officers and sailors.

Greiner was propelled by a pair of diesel motors manufactured by General Motors, which drove a pair of screw propellers. Her propulsion system was rated to produce 6,000 brake horsepower (4,500 kW) for a top speed of 19.5 knots (36.1 km/h; 22.4 mph). Oil storage amounted to between 131 and 197 long tons (133 and 200 t), which allowed a cruising radius of up to 6,000 nautical miles (11,000 km; 6,900 mi) at an economical pace of 10 knots (19 km/h; 12 mph).

The ship's armament consisted of a main battery of three 3-inch (76 mm) /50-caliber guns in individual pivot mounts, which could be used against air or surface targets. These were supported by a light anti-aircraft battery that initially consisted of four 1.1 in (28 mm) /75-caliber guns in a quadruple mount and nine 20 mm (0.79 in) Oerlikon guns. For attacks against submarines, the ship was equipped with a Hedgehog mortar, eight depth charge throwers, and two depth charge racks.

== Service history ==
She was originally intended for Great Britain under lend-lease, was launched as BDE-37 on 20 May 1943 by the Puget Sound Navy Yard, Bremerton, Washington and reallocated to the US Navy. She was renamed Greiner after Kenneth Greiner, a naval officer killed during the Battle of Dutch Harbor. The ship was commissioned on 18 August 1943.

Following shakedown and training exercise along the California-Washington coast, Greiner sailed for Pearl Harbor, reaching there on 31 October 1943. A series of training and patrol operations kept her in the Hawaiian area until 23 December, when she sailed for recently won Tarawa as flagship of Escort Squadron 28 (EscSquad 28). Greiner spent virtually a year in the Gilbert Islands-Marshall Islands area, as the great American island offensive swept westward toward Japan. The ship performed a variety of tasks, including the most important job of escorting transport vessels to the assault areas. She rescued 13 men from a downed PBM Mariner on 26 January 1944, and shelled Kusaie in the Caroline Islands, in reply to a salvo from Japanese batteries, on 1 June.

Greiner spent 3 months at Pearl Harbor for repairs and operations from July–October, and after antisubmarine exercises in Hawaiian waters spent December patrolling around Wotje, Mili, Jaluit, and Maloelap, "leapfrogged" earlier in the war. She spent the remainder of the war in the Gilberts and Marshalls plane-guarding and screening escort carrier forces, except for a short voyage to Okinawa 29 June-3 July 1945.

Greiner steamed back to the United States from Kerama Retto on 3 July, and arrived San Francisco, California on 28 July.

She decommissioned at Oakland, California on 19 November 1945 and was stricken from the Naval Vessel Register on 5 December. The ship was subsequently sold to J. G. Berkwit & Co. on 10 February 1945, and resold in 1947.

== Awards ==
- Combat Action Ribbon (retroactive)
- American Campaign Medal
- Asiatic-Pacific Campaign Medal (with three service stars)
- World War II Victory Medal
