= Japanese submarine Ro-111 =

Ro-100-class submarine

History

Japan
- Name: Submarine No. 402
- Builder: Kawasaki, Kobe, Japan
- Laid down: 20 August 1942
- Renamed: Ro-111
- Launched: 26 January 1943
- Completed: 19 July 1943
- Commissioned: 19 July 1943
- Fate: Sunk 10 June 1944
- Stricken: 10 August 1944

General characteristics
- Class & type: Ro-100-class submarine
- Displacement: 611 tonnes (601 long tons) surfaced; 795 tonnes (782 long tons) submerged
- Length: 60.90 m (199 ft 10 in) overall
- Beam: 6.00 m (19 ft 8 in)
- Draft: 3.51 m (11 ft 6 in)
- Installed power: 1,000 bhp (750 kW) (diesel); 760 hp (570 kW) (electric motor)
- Propulsion: Diesel-electric; 1 × diesel engine; 1 × electric motor
- Speed: 14.2 knots (26.3 km/h; 16.3 mph) surfaced; 8 knots (15 km/h; 9.2 mph) submerged
- Range: 3,500 nmi (6,500 km; 4,000 mi) at 12 knots (22 km/h; 14 mph) surfaced; 60 nmi (110 km; 69 mi) at 3 knots (5.6 km/h; 3.5 mph) submerged
- Test depth: 75 m (246 ft)
- Crew: 38
- Armament: 4 × bow 533 mm (21 in) torpedo tubes; 2 × 25 mm (1 in) Type 96 anti-aircraft guns or 1 × 76.2 mm (3.00 in) L/40 AA gun

Ro-111 was an Imperial Japanese Navy Ro-100-class submarine. Completed and commissioned in July 1943, she served in World War II, operating in the Indian Ocean — where she sank a cargo ship and a troopship — and off the Admiralty Islands in the Pacific Ocean. She was sunk in June 1944 during her fifth war patrol.

== Design and description ==
The Ro-100 class was a medium-sized, coastal submarine derived from the preceding Kaichū type. They displaced 611 tonnes (601 long tons) surfaced and 795 tonnes (782 long tons) submerged. The submarines were 60.9 meters (199 ft 10 in) long, had a beam of 6 meters (19 ft 8 in) and a draft of 3.51 meters (11 ft 6 in). They had a double hull and a diving depth of 75 meters (246 ft).

For surface running, the boats were powered by two 500-brake-horsepower (373 kW) diesel engines, each driving one propeller shaft. When submerged each propeller was driven by a 380-horsepower (283 kW) electric motor. They could reach 14.2 knots (26.3 km/h; 16.3 mph) on the surface and 8 knots (15 km/h; 9.2 mph) underwater. On the surface, the Ro-100s had a range of 3,500 nautical miles (6,500 km; 4,000 mi) at 12 knots (22 km/h; 14 mph); submerged, they had a range of 60 nmi (110 km; 69 mi) at 3 knots (5.6 km/h; 3.5 mph).

The boats were armed with four internal bow 53.3 cm (21.0 in) torpedo tubes and carried a total of eight torpedoes. They were also armed with two single mounts for 25 mm (1 in) Type 96 anti-aircraft guns or a single 76.2 mm (3.00 in) L/40 AA gun.

== Construction and commissioning ==
Ro-111 was laid down as Submarine No. 402 on 20 August 1942 by Kawasaki at Kobe, Japan. She had been renamed Ro-111 by the time she was launched on 26 January 1943. She was completed and commissioned on 19 July 1943.

== Service history ==
=== July–November 1943 ===
Upon commissioning, Ro-111 was attached to the Sasebo Naval District and assigned to Submarine Squadron 11 for workups. She was reassigned to Submarine Squadron 7 in the 8th Fleet on 20 July 1944. On 31 October 1943, she was reassigned to Submarine Division 30 in Submarine Squadron 8 in the Southwest Area Fleet, and she departed Kure, Japan, that day bound for Penang in Japanese-occupied British Malaya. After stopping briefly at Singapore on 16 November 1943, she got back underway the same day and reached Penang on 23 November 1943.

=== First war patrol ===
On 6 December 1943, Ro-111 departed Penang to begin her first war patrol, tasked with raiding Allied shipping in the Bay of Bengal. She attacked a British 12-ship convoy — Convoy JC.30, bound from Swansea, Wales, to Calcutta, India — in the Indian Ocean southeast of Madras, India, on 23 December 1943. One of her torpedoes struck the British 7,934-gross register ton armed cargo ship Peshawur, which was carrying 150 tons of explosives and 1,983 tons of general cargo. Peshawur′s crew — some of whom mistakenly believed an acoustic homing torpedo had hit their ship rather the wakeless Type 95 torpedo Ro-111 actually had fired — abandoned ship, and she sank two hours later. The Royal Australian Navy corvette HMAS Ipswich rescued all 134 men on board Peshawur, including her entire crew of 125 and all nine of her embarked gunners. Ro-111 returned to Penang on 29 December 1943.

=== Second war patrol ===
Ro-111 put to sea on 7 January 1944 to conduct her second war patrol, tasked with laying mines off Ceylon and then attacking Allied shipping east of Ceylon. She laid ten Type 3 mines off Elephant Rock, Ceylon, on 10 January 1944, but otherwise her patrol was uneventful, and she returned to Penang in late January 1944.

=== Third war patrol ===
Ro-111 again left Penang on 1 February 1944 to begin her third war patrol. She again operated off Ceylon, laying more mines and patrolling Ceylonese waters without finding any targets. She returned to Penang on 23 February 1944.

=== Fourth war patrol ===
At 09:00 on 7 March 1944, Ro-111 put to sea from Penang to begin her fourth war patrol, briefly escorted by the torpedo boats T-451 and T-455 as she departed. Her patrol area was in the vicinity of Calcutta. In the Bay of Bengal on 16 March 1944, she attacked Convoy HC.44, which was on a voyage from Calcutta to Chittagong, India. One of her torpedoes hit the Indian armed troopship El Madina, which was serving as the flagship of the convoy vice-commodore, at 20°54′N 089°36′E. El Madina broke in two, and her stern section sank a few minutes after the torpedo hit. While the rest of the convoy and all of its escorts left the area, the Norwegian steamer Lovstad stopped her engines and rescued El Madina′s 814 survivors. The other 380 men aboard El Madina lost their lives.

Ro-111 arrived at Penang on 25 March 1944, the same day that Submarine Division 30 was disbanded and she was reassigned to Submarine Division 51 in Submarine Squadron 7 in the Southwest Area Fleet. On 28 March 1944 she departed Penang and set course for Sasebo, Japan, which she reached in April 1944 for a refit and an overhaul.

=== Fifth war patrol ===
After completion of the work, Ro-111 departed Sasebo on 22 May 1944 bound for Truk, which she reached on 31 May 1944. She got underway from Truk on 4 June 1944 for her fifth war patrol, headed for a patrol area north of the Admiralty Islands. On 7 June 1944, she transmitted a routine situation report while operating as part of a submarine patrol line south of Truk. The Japanese never heard from her again.

=== Loss ===
On 10 June 1944, an FM-2 Wildcat fighter from the United States Navy escort aircraft carrier USS Hoggatt Bay (CVE-75) sighted an oil slick on the surface north of the Admiralty Islands which betrayed the presence of Ro-111. The destroyer USS Taylor (DD-468), operating as part of a hunter-killer group centered around Hoggatt Bay, left Hoggatt Bay′s screen to investigate. Taylor made sonar contact on Ro-111 and dropped two patterns of depth charges, but her crew observed no sign that they had damaged the submarine. After Taylor stopped to improve her sonar contact, Ro-111 surfaced about 2,500 yards (2,300 m) ahead of her at 15:41. Taylor opened fire on Ro-111 with her 5-inch (127 mm) guns and 40 mm antiaircraft guns, scoring at least ten 5-inch (127 mm) and numerous 40 mm hits on her conning tower. Ro-111 sank by the stern at 15:46 at 00°26′N 149°16′E, leaving behind an oil slick. Taylor then passed through the oil slick and dropped a pattern of depth charges, and at 15:58 her crew heard two large underwater explosions which marked the end of Ro-111.

On 13 June 1944, Ro-111 was ordered to proceed to a new patrol area south of Guam at flank speed, and on 22 June 1944 Submarine Division 51 headquarters ordered her to return to Truk, but she acknowledged neither order. On 12 July 1944, the Imperial Japanese Navy declared Ro-111 to be presumed lost with all 54 men on board. The Japanese struck her from the Navy list on 10 August 1944.
