= Irving Wiltsie =

US Navy Captain, Recipient of the Navy Cross

Irving Day Wiltsie
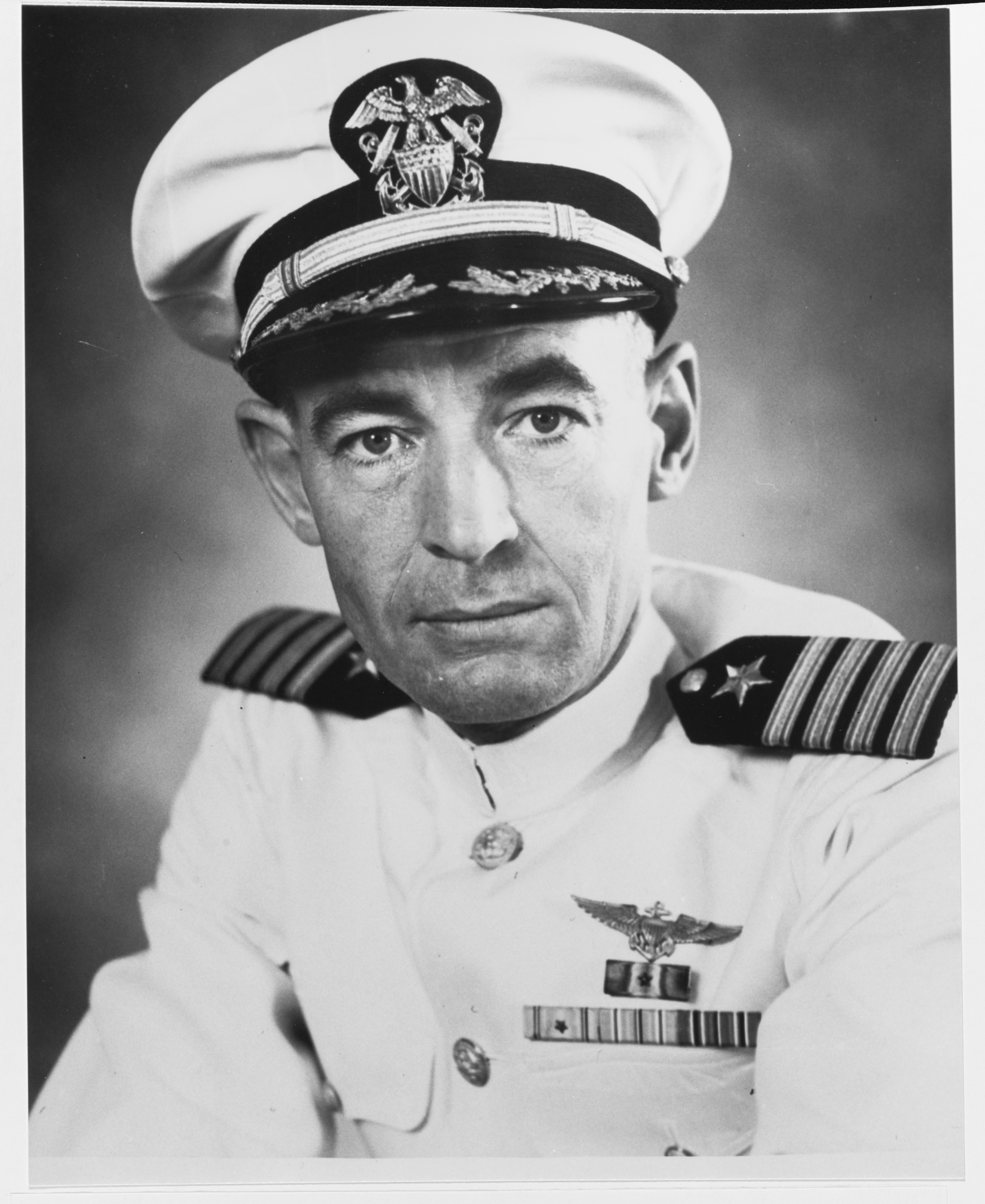
- Captain Irving Day Wiltsie
- Born: November 14, 1898; Hartford, Connecticut
- Died: November 24, 1943 (aged 45); At sea aboard Liscome Bay off Makin, Gilbert Islands
- Military career
- Allegiance: United States of America
- Branch: United States Navy
- Service years: 1921-1943
- Rank: Captain
- Commands: USS Liscome Bay (CVE-56)
- Conflicts: World War II: Battle of Midway; Battle of Makin †
- Awards: Navy Cross (posthumous); Silver Star; Purple Heart

Irving Day Wiltsie (14 November 1898 – 24 November 1943) was a United States Navy captain who was killed in action in 1943 while commanding an escort carrier in the Gilbert Islands location, in the Central Pacific during World War II. He was awarded the Navy Cross posthumously, the second highest combat decoration for valor after the Medal of Honor.

== Biography ==
Born in Hartford, Connecticut, Wiltsie graduated in the United States Naval Academy class of 1921. He then served at sea in a succession of ships, including Arizona (BB-39), Wyoming (BB-32), Raleigh (CL-7), and Cleveland (CL-21). Next he underwent flight instruction at NAS Pensacola, Florida, from 1925 to 1927 and was designated as a Naval Aviator. He subsequently served in seaplane aviation units embarked aboard Milwaukee (CL-5), Memphis (CL-13), and Texas (BB-35) before he returned to NAS Pensacola as an instructor. After another tour of sea duty—in Louisville (CA-28)—Wiltsie commanded the Naval Reserve Aviation Base at Minneapolis, Minnesota, from 29 June 1935 to 4 June 1937. He later commanded the bombing squadrons attached to Saratoga (CV-3) from June 1937 to June 1939, before he served at the Naval Air Station San Diego, California. He subsequently joined Yorktown (CV-5) as navigator on 27 June 1941 and received a promotion to commander on 1 July.

Wiltsie remained in Yorktown until her loss at the pivotal Battle of Midway from 4 to 6 June 1942. During the early stages of the action, Wiltsie displayed "outstanding professional ability" as he provided complete and accurate navigational information to air plot, thus enabling the carrier's air group to pinpoint their targets.

During the Japanese torpedo attacks on 4 June, when "Kates" from the carrier Hiryū located Yorktown and carried out a successful attack against her, Wiltsie, on instructions from the captain, conned the ship from his battle station in the conning tower and was later deemed directly responsible for the ship's evading a pair of torpedoes. When injuries sustained during the attack incapacitated the carrier's executive officer, Commander Wiltsie assumed these duties and directed the organization of a salvage party which fought valiantly to save the ship.

When Yorktown eventually succumbed to her damage and the coup de grace administered by Japanese submarine I-168, Wiltsie directed the salvage party and the wounded to rescuing vessels alongside the doomed carrier.

Wiltsie was promoted to captain in September 1942 and commanded the seaplane tender Albemarle (AV-5) from 6 October 1942 to 12 June 1943. After this tour, he supervised the fitting-out of escort carrier Glacier (CVE-33) at the Seattle-Tacoma Shipbuilding Company and went on to supervise the same kind of activities of Liscome Bay (CVE-56). Captain Wiltsie would command this escort carrier from August 1943 until the ship's loss off Makin, in the Gilbert Islands, the following November.

In the predawn darkness of 24 November, Japanese submarine I-175 torpedoed Liscome Bay—the flagship of Rear Admiral Henry M. Mullinnix—which caused a mass detonation of aircraft bombs and ammunition and started fires fed by aviation gasoline. The flames spread rapidly, and the carrier rocked with explosions. Wiltsie immediately left the bridge and proceeded along the starboard gallery deck level to ascertain the damage to his ship, as communications had been severed early on. Despite the tremendous structural damage and raging fires, the captain headed aft to determine the full extent of the damage. Damage control efforts failed, however, and the carrier sank in less than 30 minutes thereafter, carrying down with it Captain Wiltsie, Admiral Mullinix, and 644 officers and men, including Third Class Cook Dorie Miller, who was awarded a Navy Cross for extraordinary heroism on a battleship during the Japanese attack on Pearl Harbor.

The citation for Captain Wiltsie's posthumous Navy Cross noted his "calm, courageous action and valiant devotion to duty" which inspired the surviving members of the crew.

== Namesake ==
USS Wiltsie (DD-716) was named for him.
