= USS Liscome Bay =

Casablanca-class escort carrier of the US Navy

Coordinates: 2°48′N 172°36′E

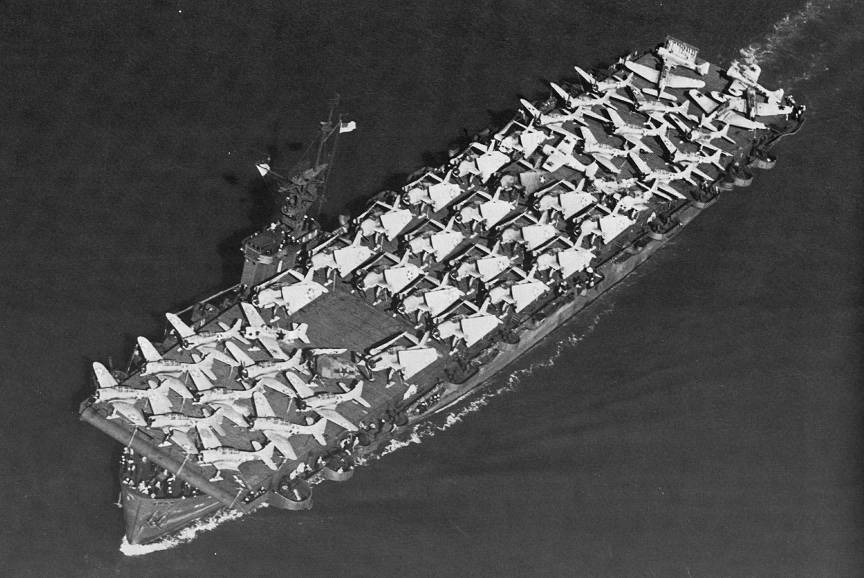
- USS Liscome Bay (CVE-56), ferrying aircraft to San Diego, 20 September 1943

History

United States
- Name: Liscome Bay
- Namesake: Liscome Bay, Alaska
- Ordered: as a Type S4-S2-BB3 hull
- Awarded: 18 June 1942
- Builder: Kaiser Shipbuilding Company, Vancouver, Washington
- Cost: $10,420,959
- Yard number: 302
- Laid down: 12 December 1942
- Launched: 19 April 1943
- Sponsored by: Mrs. Ben Moreell
- Commissioned: 7 August 1943
- Reclassified: CVE, 15 July 1943
- Identification: Hull symbol: ACV-56; CVE-56
- Honors and awards: 1 Battle star
- Fate: Torpedoed and sunk by I-175, 24 November 1943

General characteristics
- Class & type: Casablanca-class escort carrier
- Displacement: 8,188 long tons (8,319 t) (standard); 10,902 long tons (11,077 t) (full load)
- Length: 512 ft 3 in (156.13 m) (oa); 490 ft (150 m) (wl); 474 ft (144 m) (fd)
- Beam: 65 ft 2 in (19.86 m); 108 ft (33 m) (extreme width)
- Draft: 20 ft 9 in (6.32 m) (max)
- Installed power: 4 × Babcock & Wilcox boilers; 9,000 shp (6,700 kW)
- Propulsion: 2 × Skinner Unaflow reciprocating steam engines; 2 × screws
- Speed: 19 knots (35 km/h; 22 mph)
- Range: 10,240 nmi (18,960 km; 11,780 mi) at 15 knots (28 km/h; 17 mph)
- Complement: Total: 910–916 officers and sailors; Embarked Squadron: 50–56; Ship's Crew: 860
- Armament: 1 × 5 in (127 mm)/38 cal dual-purpose gun; 4 × twin 40 mm (1.57 in) Bofors anti-aircraft guns; 12 × 20 mm (0.79 in) Oerlikon anti-aircraft cannons
- Aircraft carried: 27 aircraft
- Aviation facilities: 1 × catapult; 2 × elevators

Service record
- Part of: United States Pacific Fleet (1943)
- Commanders: Captain I.D. Wiltsie
- Operations: Gilbert Islands operation; Makin Island (20–23 November 1943)

USS Liscome Bay (ACV/CVE-56) was the second of fifty Casablanca-class escort carriers built to serve the United States Navy during World War II. Launched in April 1943 and commissioned the following August, she was named for Liscome Bay in Dall Island in the Alexander Archipelago of Alaska. On 24 November 1943, her munitions were catastrophically detonated by a torpedo attack by the Japanese submarine I-175 while she was acting as the flagship of Carrier Division 24, which was supporting operations on Makin. She quickly sank with the loss of 702 officers and sailors, including Doris Miller, the first black recipient of the Navy Cross and the namesake of Doris Miller, a Gerald R. Ford-class aircraft carrier. Her loss is the deadliest sinking of a carrier in the history of the United States Navy. (Note: The bomb strike on the fleet carrier Franklin was deadlier, with 807 killed, but she did not sink, and was later repaired.)

== Design and description ==
A side profile of the design of Thetis Bay.

Liscome Bay was a Casablanca-class escort carrier, the most numerous type of aircraft carriers ever built. Built to stem heavy losses during the Battle of the Atlantic, they came into service in late 1943, by which time the U-boat threat was already in retreat. Although some did see service in the Atlantic, the majority were utilized in the Pacific, ferrying aircraft, providing logistics support, and conducting close air support for the island-hopping campaigns. The Casablanca-class carriers were built on the standardized Type S4-S2-BB3 hull, a lengthened variant of the Doyen-class hull, and specifically designed to be mass-produced using welded prefabricated sections. This allowed them to be produced at unprecedented speeds: the final ship of her class, Munda, was delivered to the Navy just 101 days after the laying of her keel.

Liscome Bay was 512 ft 3 in (156.13 m) long overall (490 ft (150 m) at the waterline) and had a beam of 65 ft 2 in (19.86 m) and a draft of 20 ft 9 in (6.32 m). She displaced 8,188 long tons (8,319 t) standard, which increased to 10,902 long tons (11,077 t) with a full load. To carry out flight operations, the ship had a 257 ft (78 m) hangar deck and a 474 ft (144 m) flight deck. Her compact size necessitated the installation of an aircraft catapult at her bow, and there were two aircraft elevators to facilitate movement of aircraft between the flight and hangar deck: one each fore and aft.

She was powered by four Babcock & Wilcox Express D boilers that raised 285 psi (1,970 kPa) of steam at 577 °F (303 °C). The steam generated by these boilers fed two Skinner Unaflow reciprocating steam engines, delivering 9,000 hp (6,700 kW) to two propeller shafts. This allowed her to reach speeds of 19 kn (35 km/h; 22 mph), with a cruising range of 10,240 nmi (18,960 km; 11,780 mi) at 15 kn (28 km/h; 17 mph). For armament, one 5 in (127 mm)/38 caliber dual-purpose gun was mounted on the stern. Additional anti-aircraft defense was provided by eight Bofors 40 mm (1.57 in) anti-aircraft guns in single mounts and twelve Oerlikon 20 mm (0.79 in) cannons mounted around the perimeter of the deck. Sensors onboard consisted of a SG surface-search radar and a SK air-search radar.

Although Casablanca-class escort carriers were intended to function with a crew of 860 and an embarked squadron of 50 to 56, the exigencies of wartime often necessitated the inflation of the crew count. They were designed to operate with 27 aircraft, but the hangar deck could accommodate much more during transport or training missions. During her only combat deployment, Operation Kourbash, she carried 11 FM-1 and five F4F-4 fighters, as well as nine TBM-1 and three TBM-1C torpedo bombers, for a total of 28 aircraft.

== Construction ==
She was laid down on 12 December 1942, under a Maritime Commission contract, MCE hull 1137, by Kaiser Shipbuilding Company, Vancouver, Washington. She was launched on 19 April 1943; sponsored by Mrs. Clara Klinksick, wife of Rear Admiral Ben Moreell, the chief of the Navy's Bureau of Yards and Docks. Originally, she was intended to be sent to the British Royal Navy under the name HMS Ameer. However, a change in plans resulted in the Bogue-class escort carrier USS Baffins being redesignated as Ameer in Liscome Bay's place. She was named Liscome Bay on 28 June 1943, as part of tradition that named escort carriers after bays or sounds in Alaska. The vessel was assigned the hull classification symbol CVE-56 on 15 July 1943, and was commissioned on 7 August 1943. Captain Irving D. Wiltsie was the ship's first commander, and her crew was derived from the Bogue-class escort carrier USS Glacier, which had been ordered in July 1942, but was sent to the Royal Navy as part of the Lend-Lease program.

== Service history ==
After being commissioned, Liscome Bay proceeded southwards towards San Diego, California, picking up and ferrying 60 aircraft from San Francisco on the way, arriving on 22 September 1943. For the next month, she engaged in training operations off the Southern California coast. On 11 October, she was designated as the flagship of Carrier Division 24, under the command of Rear Admiral Henry M. Mullinnix. On 14 October, she received her aircraft contingent, and on 21 October, she departed for Pearl Harbor, arriving a week later, on 27 October. She then conducted additional drills and training exercises off of Hawaii until early November, when she was assigned to the invasion fleet assembling for Operation Kourbash. As a member of Carrier Division 24, she departed from Pearl Harbor on 10 November as part of Task Force 52 commanded by Rear Admiral Richmond K. Turner, bound for the invasion of the Gilbert Islands. It was to be her first and last mission.

Liscome Bay was assigned to the naval forces supporting the invasion of Makin. The invasion bombardment announcing the first major U.S. naval thrust into the central Pacific began on 20 November at 05:00. Just 76 hours later, Tarawa and Makin Islands were both captured. Liscome Bay's aircraft had played a vital role in the capture of Makin, providing close air support and bombing Japanese positions. In total, 2,278 sorties were conducted by the carrier task group in support of Operation Galvanic, which neutralized enemy airbases, supported U.S. Army landings and ground operations with bombing and strafing missions, and intercepted enemy aircraft. With the islands secured, U.S. naval forces began retiring. However, Liscome Bay stayed with the rest of her task force as the 27th Infantry Division mopped up resistance on Makin.

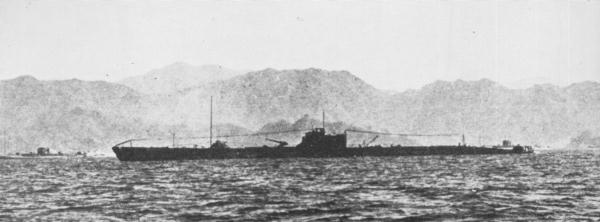
I-175 in October 1941

=== Sinking ===
The invasion of the Gilbert Islands had caught the Japanese command by surprise. Admiral Mineichi Koga, in desperation, issued orders to recall four Japanese submarines southwest of Hawaii and five submarines near Truk and Rabaul to converge on the Gilberts. Of the nine Japanese submarines sent to sortie against the U.S. forces in the Gilberts, six were lost.

On 23 November, however, the submarine I-175, commanded by Lieutenant Commander Sunao Tabata, arrived off Makin. The U.S. task group, built around Rear Admiral Henry M. Mullinnix's three escort carriers, was steaming 20 mi (32 km) southwest of Butaritari Island at 15 knots. The task group was traveling in a circular formation, with seven destroyers, the heavy cruiser Baltimore, the battleships Pennsylvania, New Mexico, and Mississippi, and Liscome Bay's two sister ships, Corregidor and Coral Sea, surrounding her. Liscome Bay, as the guide for the group, was located dead center between the other ships. As collisions were deemed to be a greater risk to the ships than a potential submarine attack, the ships were not zig-zagging.

At 04:30 on 24 November, reveille was sounded in Liscome Bay. At 04:34, the destroyer Franks left to investigate a signal beacon, likely dropped from a Japanese plane. This resulted in a gap within Liscome Bay's screen. At 04:36, the radar operators on New Mexico spotted a short-lived blip, which may have represented I-175 diving into position. Flight quarters was sounded at 04:50. The crew went to routine general quarters at 05:05, when flight crews prepared their planes for dawn launching. Thirteen planes, including one forward on the catapult, had been readied on the flight deck. These had all been fueled and armed. An additional seven planes in the hangar were not fueled or armed. She had a large amount of munitions on board, stored below-decks. Meanwhile, the task group executed a turn to the northeast, which brought Liscome Bay to a course presenting her side to I-175. The Japanese submarine fired a spread of at least three Type 95 torpedoes towards the task force.

Around 05:10, a lookout on the starboard (right) side of Liscome Bay reported seeing a torpedo headed for the ship. The torpedo struck behind the aft engine room, as Liscome Bay was conducting its turn, and detonated the bomb magazine, causing a devastating explosion that engulfed the ship and sent shrapnel flying as far as 5,000 yards (4,600 m) away. Considerable debris fell on the battleship New Mexico about 1,500 yards (1,400 m) off, while a sailor on board the escort carrier Coral Sea was reportedly hit by a fire extinguisher from Liscome Bay. The entire task force was rocked by the explosion, but no other ships were significantly damaged. A mushroom cloud erupted, rising thousands of feet above the wreck of Liscome Bay.

The detonation sheared off nearly the entire stern of the carrier, killing everyone behind the forward bulkhead of the aft engine room. Seawater quickly rushed into the gap, mixing with oil released from the hull. Both the hangar and flight decks were heavily damaged. Parts of the superstructure, including the radar antenna, collapsed onto the deck. The forward part of the hangar was immediately engulfed in flames, igniting the few remaining planes on the flight deck. Planes fell off the carrier's deck. Steam, compressed air, and fire-main pressure were lost throughout the ship. Fires on the flight deck caused ammunition within the burning aircraft and antiaircraft guns to detonate, further complicating matters. The gasoline coated water surrounding Liscome Bay caught fire, hampering efforts by survivors to escape.

It didn't look like a ship at all, we thought it was an ammunition dump... She just went whoom – an orange ball of flame.

— Lieutenant John Dix, communications officer on the destroyer Hoel

At 05:33, only 23 minutes after the explosion, Liscome Bay listed to starboard and sank; 12 Grumman TBM Avenger torpedo bombers, seven Grumman FM-1 Wildcat fighters, and four Grumman F4F Wildcat fighters went down with Liscome Bay.

=== Rescue ===
When Liscome Bay detonated, the rest of the task group immediately conducted evasive maneuvers, scattering from her wreck. At 05:40, destroyers Morris, Hughes, and Hull arrived at the oil slick to rescue survivors, but many of the sailors hauled up were dead or dying. At 06:10, destroyer Maury spotted two torpedo wakes, one just 15 yards (14 m) from the destroyer's hull. A radar operator on New Mexico detected an echo, and Hull was recalled to join Gridley in dropping depth charges. Macdonough took Hull's place in picking up survivors. At 08:00, the search operation was concluded. Of the 916 (Note: The crew figures for Liscome Bay vary widely, owing to transferred crew and the ship's status as the flagship for Carrier Division 24. In the ship's official navy history, the crew count is listed as 911, while in Lieutenant Commander Oliver Ames's action report, the crew count is listed as 948. For the purposes of this article, the crew count is listed as 916, in correspondence with DANFS.) crewmen aboard Liscome Bay, 644 went down with the ship, while 272 survived. Many of the survivors died of wounds soon afterwards, resulting in a final total of 702 fatalities from Liscome Bay. Including those lost on Liscome Bay, U.S. casualties in the assault on Makin Island exceeded the strength of the entire Japanese garrison.

== Aftermath ==
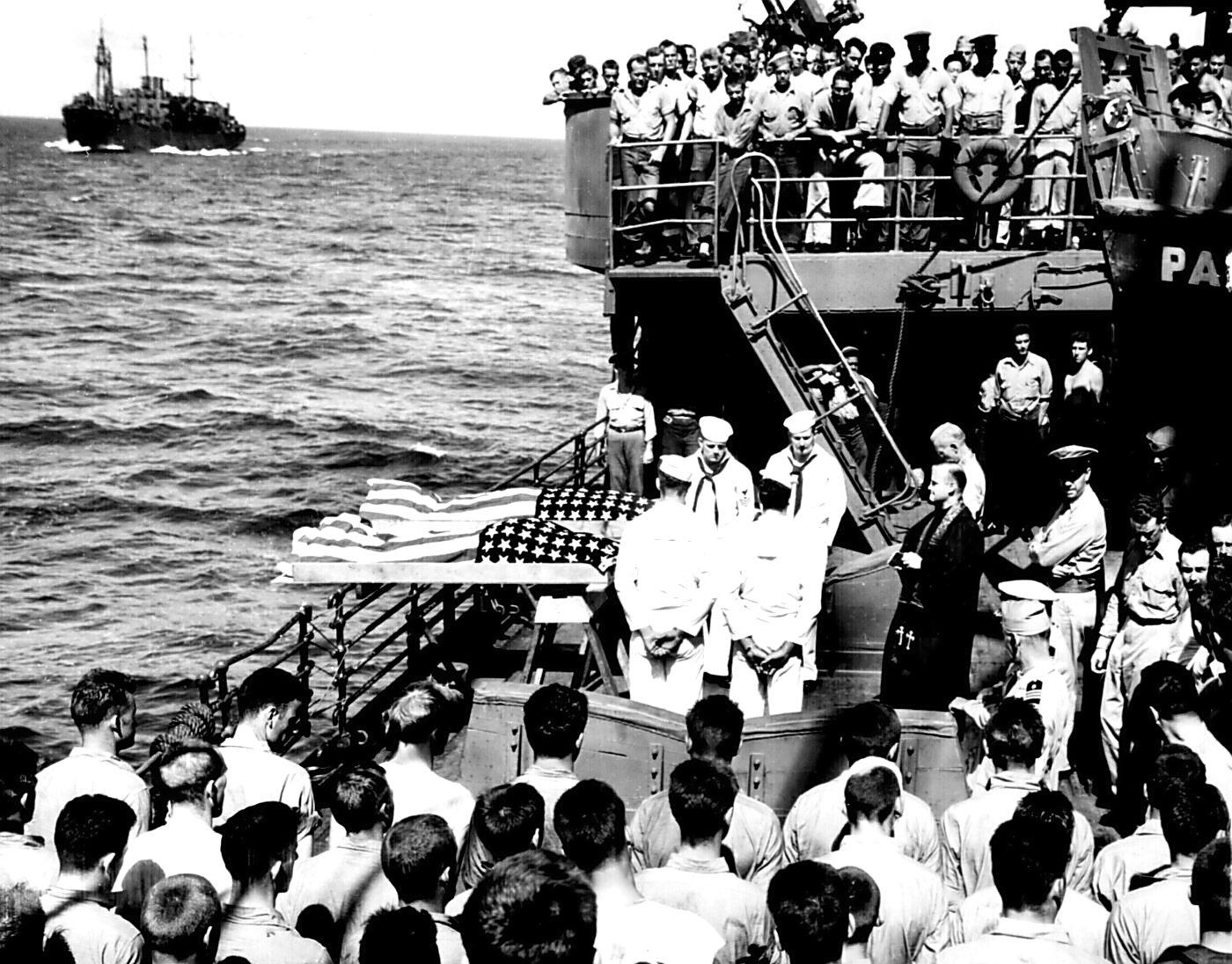
Burial at sea aboard troopship Leonard Wood of two Liscome Bay sailors, victims of the submarine attack by I-175: In the foreground facing the ceremony are survivors of Liscome Bay.

The survivors were transferred at Makin Lagoon from the destroyers onto the attack transports Leonard Wood and Neville. On Thanksgiving night, two of the survivors died, and were buried at sea. On 2 December, the navy announced that Liscome Bay had been sunk off Makin Island.

Over two months later, on 4 February 1944, I-175 was detected and sunk by the destroyer Charrette and the destroyer escort Fair, using their Hedgehog antisubmarine mortar.

=== Legacy ===
In the Chapel of St. Cornelius, located within Valley Forge Military College's Wayne, Pennsylvania, campus, are two painted-glass windows that serve as a memorial to Liscome Bay. The windows were presented by Lieutenant (J.G.) Samuel S. Rickley, V4 Division Officer, and his son, George R. Rickley, VFMA Class of 1965.

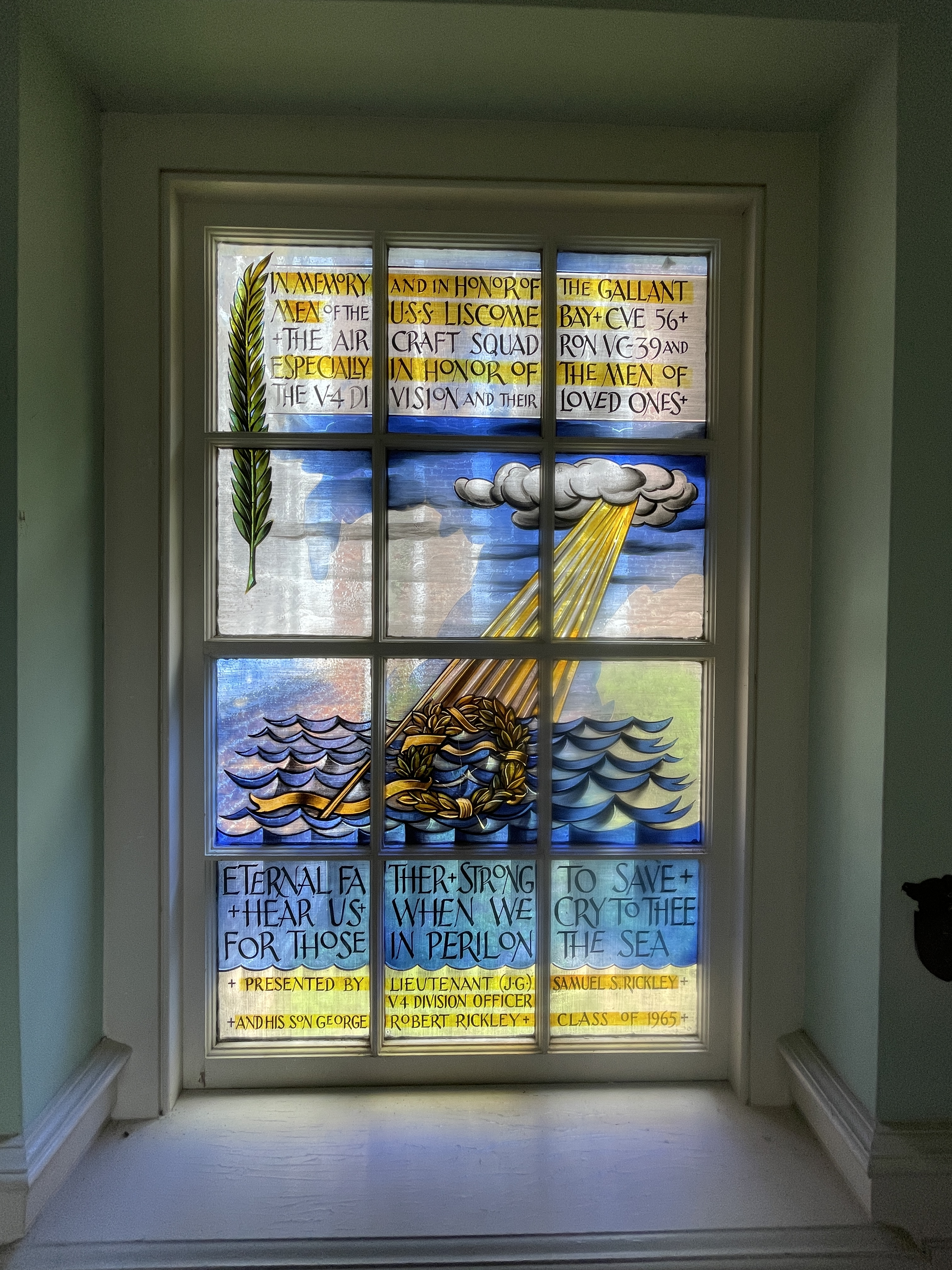
Painted-glass windows which act as a memorial to Liscome Bay at Valley Forge Military College

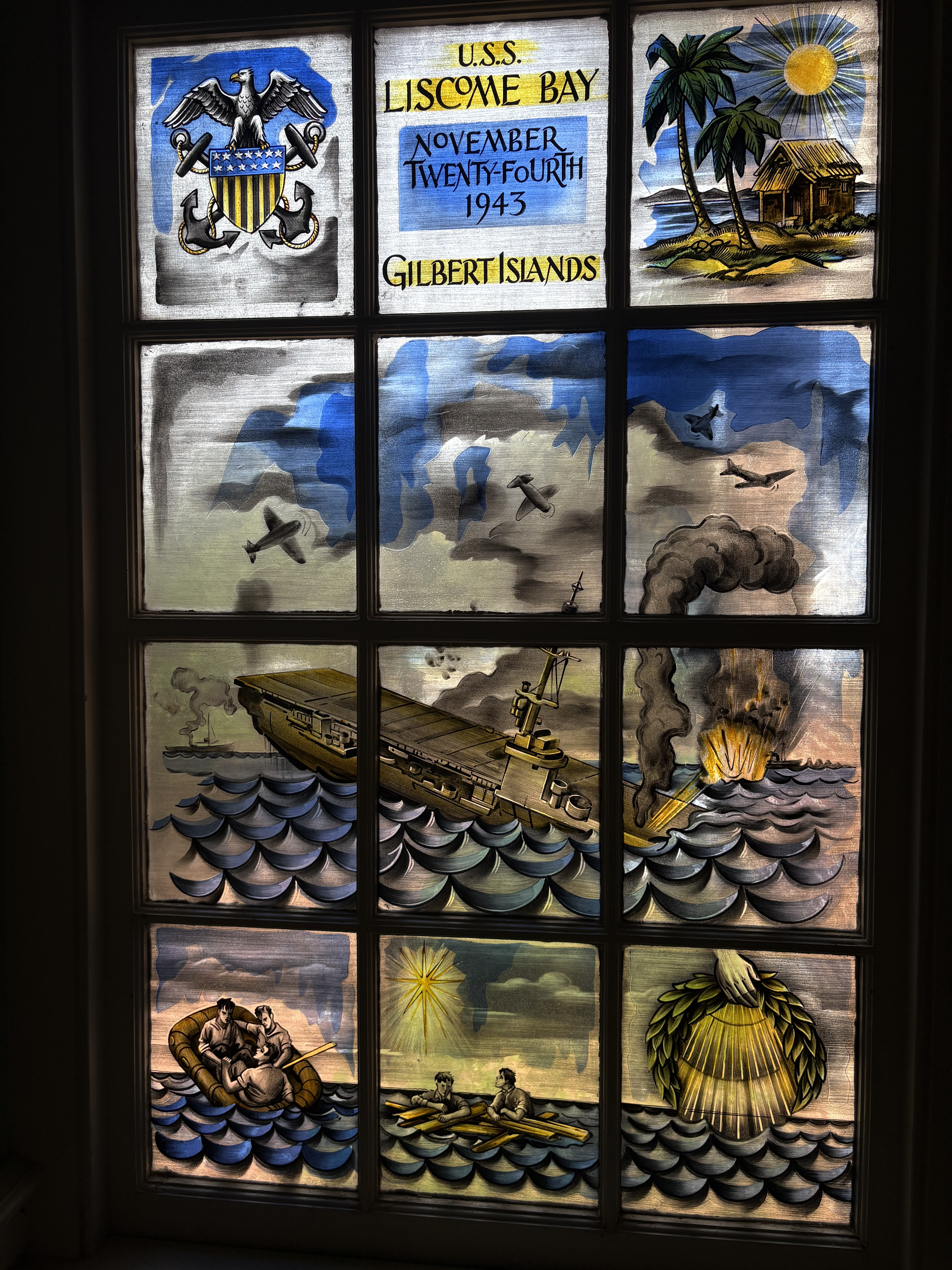
Painted-glass windows which act as a memorial to Liscome Bay at Valley Forge Military College

On the museum ship Yorktown, a memorial plaque was installed in 1990 to the ship.

== Notable crew ==
- John G. Crommelin: Chief of Staff of Carrier Division 24, politician
- †William H. Hollister & Richard J. Hollister: two of the three brothers who served in the U.S. Navy and who all died in 1943; namesake of destroyer USS Hollister (DD-788)
- Robert Keeton: Future legal scholar, United States District Judge
- †Doris Miller: First African-American to receive the Navy Cross, namesake of frigate USS Miller (FF-1091), and of USS Doris Miller (CVN-81), a Gerald R. Ford-class aircraft carrier scheduled to be laid down in 2026 and launched in 2029.
- †Henry M. Mullinnix: Admiral of Carrier Division 24, namesake of destroyer USS Mullinnix (DD-944)
- †Irving D. Wiltsie: Captain of Liscome Bay, namesake of destroyer USS Wiltsie (DD-716)
- William J. Woodward Jr., banker and Thoroughbred horse-breeder

== See also ==
- List of United States Navy losses in World War II

== General sources ==
=== Online sources ===
- "COST OF WAR-BUILT VESSELS FROM INCEPTION, FROM OCTOBER 25, 1936 to JUNE 30, 1946" (PDF). United States Maritime Commission.
- "Liscome Bay". Dictionary of American Naval Fighting Ships. Naval History and Heritage Command. 29 July 2015.
- "Kaiser Vancouver, Vancouver WA". www.ShipbuildingHistory.com. 27 November 2010. Archived from the original on 16 June 2019.
- "USS Liscome Bay (CVE-56)". NavSource. 30 September 2018.
- Hevesi, Dennis (4 August 2007). ""Robert E. Keeton, 87, Author of Influential Law Treatises, Is Dead."". The New York Times. Archived from the original on 24 November 2018.
- "World Aircraft Carriers List: US Escort Carriers, S4 Hulls". Hazegray.org. 14 December 1998. Archived from the original on 19 November 2021.
- LaGrone, Sam (18 January 2020). "Next Ford-class Carrier to be Named After Pearl Harbor Hero Doris Miller". USNI News. Archived from the original on 16 December 2021.
- "U.S.S. Liscome Bay (CVE56) Loss in Action". Naval History And Heritage Command. 24 November 1943. This article incorporates text from this source, which is in the public domain.

=== Bibliography ===
- Adcock, Al (1996), Escort Carriers in Action - Warships No. 9, Carrollton, Texas: Squadron/Signal Publications, ISBN 9780897473569
- Chesneau, Robert; Gardiner, Robert (1980), Conway's All the World's Fighting Ships 1922–1946, London, England: Naval Institute Press, ISBN 9780870219139
- Friedman, Norman (1983), U.S. Aircraft Carriers: An Illustrated Design History, Annapolis, Maryland: Naval Institute Press, ISBN 9780870217395
- Hornfischer, J.D. The Last Stand of the Tin Can Sailors. p. 67.
- War Damage Report No. 45. U.S. Hydrographic Office. 10 March 1944. Archived from the original on 30 April 2017.
- Noles, James (2010), Twenty-Three Minutes to Eternity: The Final Voyage of the Escort Carrier USS Liscome Bay, Tuscaloosa, Alabama: University of Alabama Press, ISBN 978-0817356033
- Ross, Al (1993), The Escort Carrier Gambier Bay, Anatomy of the Ship, London, England: Conway Maritime Press, ISBN 9781557502353
- Y'Blood, William (2012), The Little Giants: U.S. Escort Carriers Against Japan, Annapolis, Maryland: Naval Institute Press, ISBN 9781612512471
