= Doris Miller =

Navy Cross recipient (1919–1943)

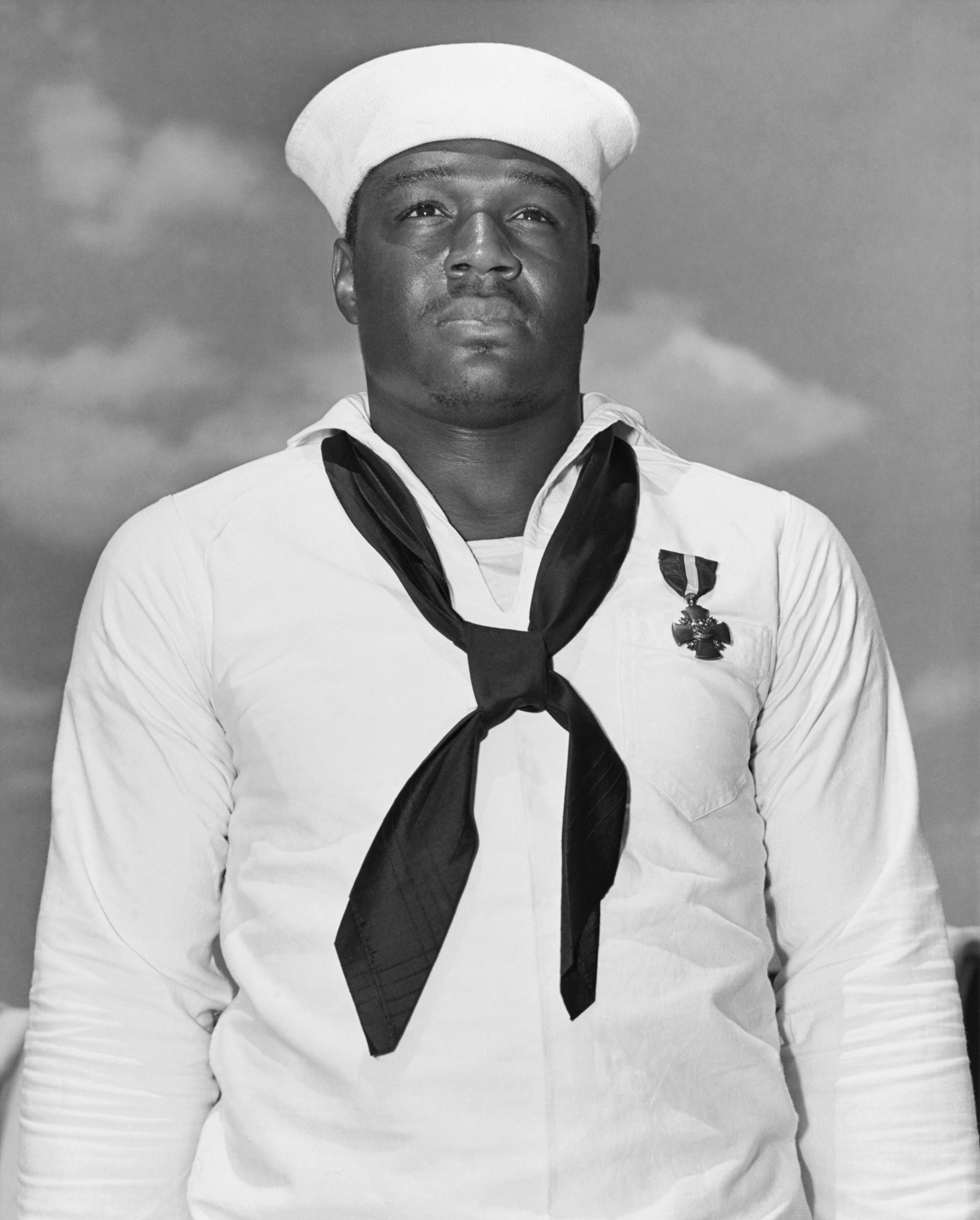
- Miller wearing his Navy Cross in May 1942
- Born: October 12, 1919; Waco, Texas, U.S.
- Died: November 24, 1943 (aged 24); USS Liscome Bay, off Makin Atoll, Gilbert and Ellice Islands
- Military career
- Allegiance: United States of America
- Branch: United States Navy
- Service years: 1939–1943
- Rank: Cook Petty Officer First Class
- Nickname: "Dorie"
- Service number: 356-12-35
- Units: USS Pyro; USS West Virginia; USS Indianapolis; USS Liscome Bay
- Conflicts: World War II; Pacific War; Attack on Pearl Harbor; Battle of Makin †
- Awards: Navy Cross; Purple Heart; Combat Action Ribbon

Doris "Dorie" Miller (October 12, 1919 – November 24, 1943) was a U.S. Navy sailor who was the first Black recipient of the Navy Cross and a nominee for the Medal of Honor. As a mess attendant second class aboard the battleship USS West Virginia, Miller helped carry wounded sailors to safety during the attack on Pearl Harbor. He then operated an anti-aircraft gun and, despite no prior training in gunnery, officially shot down one plane (according to Navy Department records), but Miller and other eyewitnesses claimed a range of four to six.

Miller received the Navy Cross from Admiral Chester Nimitz on May 27, 1942, but many sailors and naval officers believed that Miller's heroism deserved a Medal of Honor. Miller was nominated for a Medal of Honor by a congressman from Michigan and a senator from New York, and the Black press enthusiastically campaigned for Miller to receive this decoration. Secretary of the Navy Frank Knox, who opposed Black sailors serving the United States in any combat role, recommended against Miller receiving the Medal of Honor. No Black sailor, soldier, or Marine was awarded the Medal of Honor between 1941 and 1945, and in 1996 Vernon J. Baker was the only Black veteran of World War II to be awarded the decoration while still alive.

In June 1943, Miller was promoted to cook petty officer, third class. In November 1943, Miller was killed in action when his ship, the escort carrier Liscome Bay, was torpedoed by a Japanese submarine during the Battle of Makin in the Gilbert Islands, with the loss of 702 officers and sailors – the deadliest sinking of a carrier in the history of the United States Navy.

A Knox-class frigate, USS Miller (FF-1091) was named in Miller's honor prior to its commissioning on June 30, 1973.

On January 20, 2020, acting Secretary of the Navy Thomas B. Modly named a future Gerald R. Ford-class aircraft carrier the USS Doris Miller (CVN-81) in a naming ceremony at Pearl Harbor, Hawaii. It will be the first aircraft carrier named for an African American, and it will also be the first aircraft carrier named in honor of an American Sailor for actions while serving in the enlisted ranks. The ship is scheduled to be laid down in 2026 and launched in 2029.

== Early life and education ==
Miller was born in Waco, Texas, on October 12, 1919, to Conery and Henrietta Miller. He was named Doris, as the midwife who assisted his mother was convinced before his birth that the baby would be a girl. He was the third of four sons and helped around the house, cooked meals and did laundry, as well as worked on the family farm. He was a fullback on the football team at Waco's Alexander James Moore High School. He began attending the eighth grade on January 25, 1937, at age 17; he repeated the grade the following year because of poor performance, so he decided to drop out of school. He filled his time squirrel hunting with a .22 rifle and completed a correspondence course in taxidermy. He applied to join the Civilian Conservation Corps but was not accepted. At that time, he was 6 feet 3 inches (1.91 m) tall and weighed more than 200 pounds (91 kg). Miller worked on his father's farm until shortly before his 20th birthday.

Miller's nickname "Dorie" may have originated from a typographical error. He was nominated for recognition for his actions on December 7, 1941, and the Pittsburgh Courier released a story on March 14, 1942, which gave his name as "Dorie Miller". Since then, some writers have suggested that it was a "nickname to shipmates and friends".

== Naval career ==
Miller enlisted in the U.S. Navy as a mess attendant third class at the Naval Recruiting Station in Dallas, Texas, for six years on September 16, 1939. Mess attendant was one of the few ratings open at the time to Black sailors. He was transferred to the Naval Training Center, Naval Operating Base, Norfolk, Virginia, arriving on September 19. After training school, he was assigned to the ammunition ship Pyro (AE-1) and then transferred on January 2, 1940, to the Colorado-class battleship West Virginia (BB-48). It was on West Virginia where he started competition boxing, becoming the ship's heavyweight champion. In July, he was on temporary duty aboard Nevada (BB-36) at Secondary Battery Gunnery School. He returned to West Virginia on August 3. He advanced in rating to mess attendant second class on February 16, 1941.

=== Attack on Pearl Harbor ===
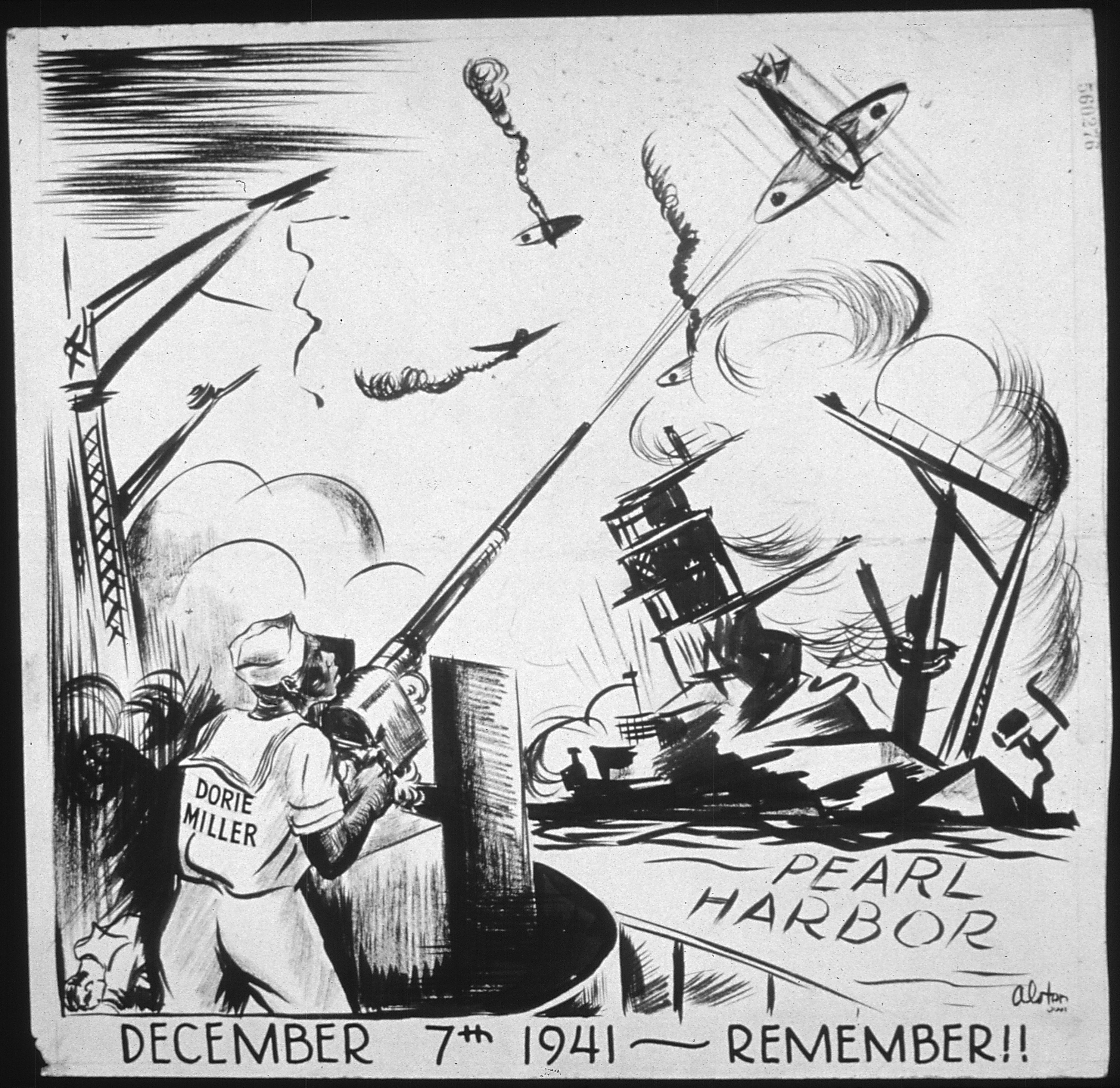
Illustration of Miller defending the fleet at Pearl Harbor (Charles Alston, Office of War Information and Public Relations)

Miller woke up at 6 a.m. on December 7, 1941, aboard West Virginia. He served breakfast mess and was collecting laundry at 7:57 a.m. when planes from the Japanese aircraft carrier Akagi fired the first of seven torpedoes that hit West Virginia. The "battle stations" alarm went off; Miller headed for his battle station, an anti-aircraft battery magazine amidships, only to discover that a torpedo had destroyed it.

He then went to "Times Square" on deck, a central spot aboard the ship where the fore-to-aft and port-to-starboard passageways crossed, reporting himself available for other duty and was assigned to help carry wounded sailors to places of greater safety. Lieutenant Commander Doir C. Johnson, the ship's communications officer, spotted Miller and saw his physical prowess, so he ordered him to accompany him to the conning tower on the flag bridge to assist in moving the ship's captain, Mervyn Bennion, who had a gaping wound in his abdomen where he had apparently been hit by shrapnel after the first Japanese attack. Miller and another sailor lifted the skipper but were unable to remove him from the bridge, so they carried him on a cot from his exposed position on the damaged bridge to a sheltered spot on the deck behind the conning tower where he remained during the second Japanese attack. Captain Bennion refused to leave his post, questioned his officers and men about the condition of the ship, and gave orders and instructions to crew members to defend the ship and fight. Unable to go to the deck below because of smoke and flames, he was carried up a ladder to the navigation bridge, where he died from blood loss despite the aid from a pharmacist mate. He was posthumously awarded the Medal of Honor.

Lieutenant Frederic H. White had ordered Miller to help him and Ensign Victor Delano load the unmanned number 1 and number 2 Browning .50 caliber anti-aircraft machine guns aft of the conning tower. Miller was not familiar with the weapon, but White and Delano instructed him on how to operate it. Delano expected Miller to feed ammunition to one machine gun, but his attention was diverted and, when he looked again, Miller was firing one of the machine guns. White then loaded ammunition into both machine guns and assigned Miller the starboard machine gun.

Miller fired the machine gun until he ran out of ammunition, whereupon he was ordered by Lieutenant Claude V. Ricketts to help carry the captain up to the navigation bridge out of the thick oily smoke generated by the many fires on and around the ship; Miller was officially credited with downing at least two hostile planes. "I think I got one of those Jap planes. They were diving pretty close to us," he said later. Japanese aircraft eventually dropped two armor-piercing bombs through the deck of the battleship and launched five 18-inch (460 mm) torpedoes into her port side. When the attack finally lessened, Miller helped move injured sailors through oil and water to the quarterdeck, thereby "unquestionably saving the lives of a number of people who might otherwise have been lost".

The ship was heavily damaged by bombs, torpedoes, and resulting explosions and fires, but the crew prevented her from capsizing by counter-flooding compartments. Instead, West Virginia sank to the harbor bottom in shallow water as her surviving crew abandoned ship, including Miller; the ship was later raised and restored for continued service in the war. On West Virginia, 132 men were killed and 52 were wounded from the Japanese attack. On December 13, Miller reported to the heavy cruiser Indianapolis (CA-35).

==== Commendation ====
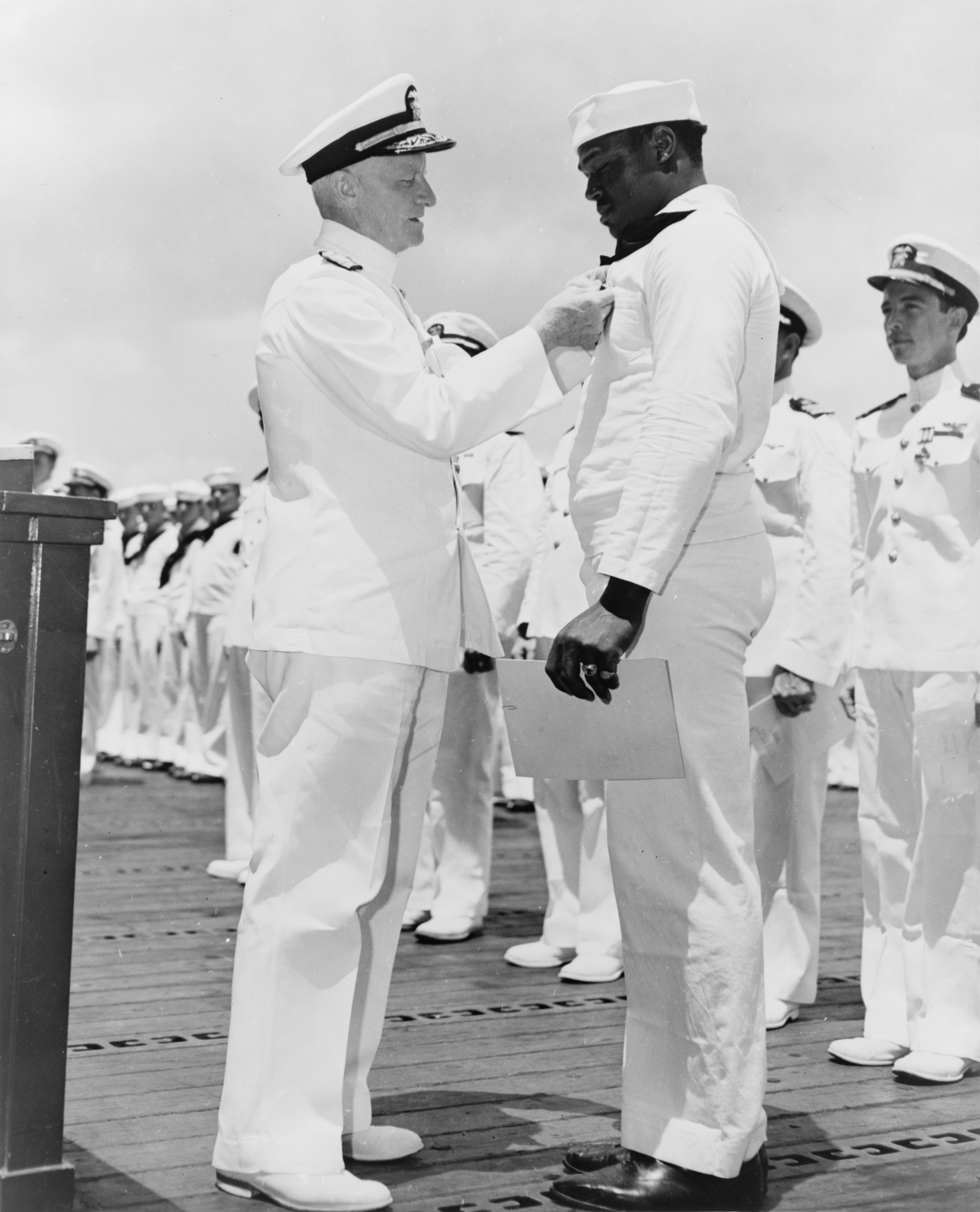
Admiral Chester W. Nimitz pins a Navy Cross on Mess Attendant Second Class Miller during a ceremony aboard the USS Enterprise (CV-6) at Pearl Harbor, on May 27, 1942.

On January 1, 1942, the Navy released a list of commendations for actions on December 7. Among them was a single commendation for an unnamed Black man. The National Association for the Advancement of Colored People (NAACP) had asked President Franklin D. Roosevelt to award the Distinguished Service Cross to the unknown Black sailor. The Navy Board of Awards received a recommendation that the sailor be considered for recognition. On March 12, an Associated Press story named the sailor as Dorie Miller, citing the African-American newspaper Pittsburgh Courier. Additional news reports credited Lawrence D. Reddick with learning the name through correspondence with the Navy Department, with these news reports giving the Double V campaign greater legitimacy and momentum. In the following days, Senator James M. Mead introduced a Senate bill [S.Res. 2392] to award Miller the Medal of Honor, and Representative John Dingell Sr. introduced a matching House bill [H.R. 6800].

Miller was regarded as one of the first U.S. heroes of World War II. He was commended in a letter signed by Secretary of the Navy Frank Knox on April 1, and the next day CBS Radio broadcast an episode of the series They Live Forever that dramatized Miller's actions. Black organizations began a campaign to honor Miller with additional recognition. On April 4, the Pittsburgh Courier urged readers to write to members of the congressional Naval Affairs Committee in support of awarding the Medal of Honor to Miller. The All-Southern Negro Youth Conference launched a signature campaign on April 17–19. On May 10, the National Negro Congress denounced Knox's recommendation against awarding Miller the Medal of Honor. On May 11 President Roosevelt approved the Navy Cross for Miller. (Note: At the time, the Navy Cross was the third-highest Navy award for gallantry during combat, after the Medal of Honor and the Navy Distinguished Service Medal. On August 7, 1942, Congress revised the order of precedence, placing the Navy Cross above the Distinguished Service Medal in precedence.)

On May 27 Miller was one of nine officers and men personally recognized by Admiral Chester W. Nimitz, Commander in Chief, Pacific Fleet, aboard the aircraft carrier Enterprise (CV-6) at anchor in Pearl Harbor. Nimitz presented Miller with the Navy Cross and stated, "This marks the first time in this conflict that such high tribute has been made in the Pacific Fleet to a member of his race and I'm sure that the future will see others similarly honored for brave acts."

===== Later Medal of Honor efforts =====
Efforts to award Miller the Medal of Honor have continued for decades. Members of Congress first called for Miller to receive the Medal of Honor in 1942, following public recognition of his actions during the attack on Pearl Harbor. Subsequent congressional efforts have sought reconsideration or authorization of a posthumous award, including legislation introduced in 2017 and 2025. In August 2026, ABC News reported that Miller was under consideration for an upgrade of his Navy Cross to the Medal of Honor and that, according to one source familiar with the discussions, Secretary of Defense Pete Hegseth had sent a memorandum to Congress recommending the award. As of 1 September 2026, no Medal of Honor had been formally announced.

=== Return to United States and the war ===
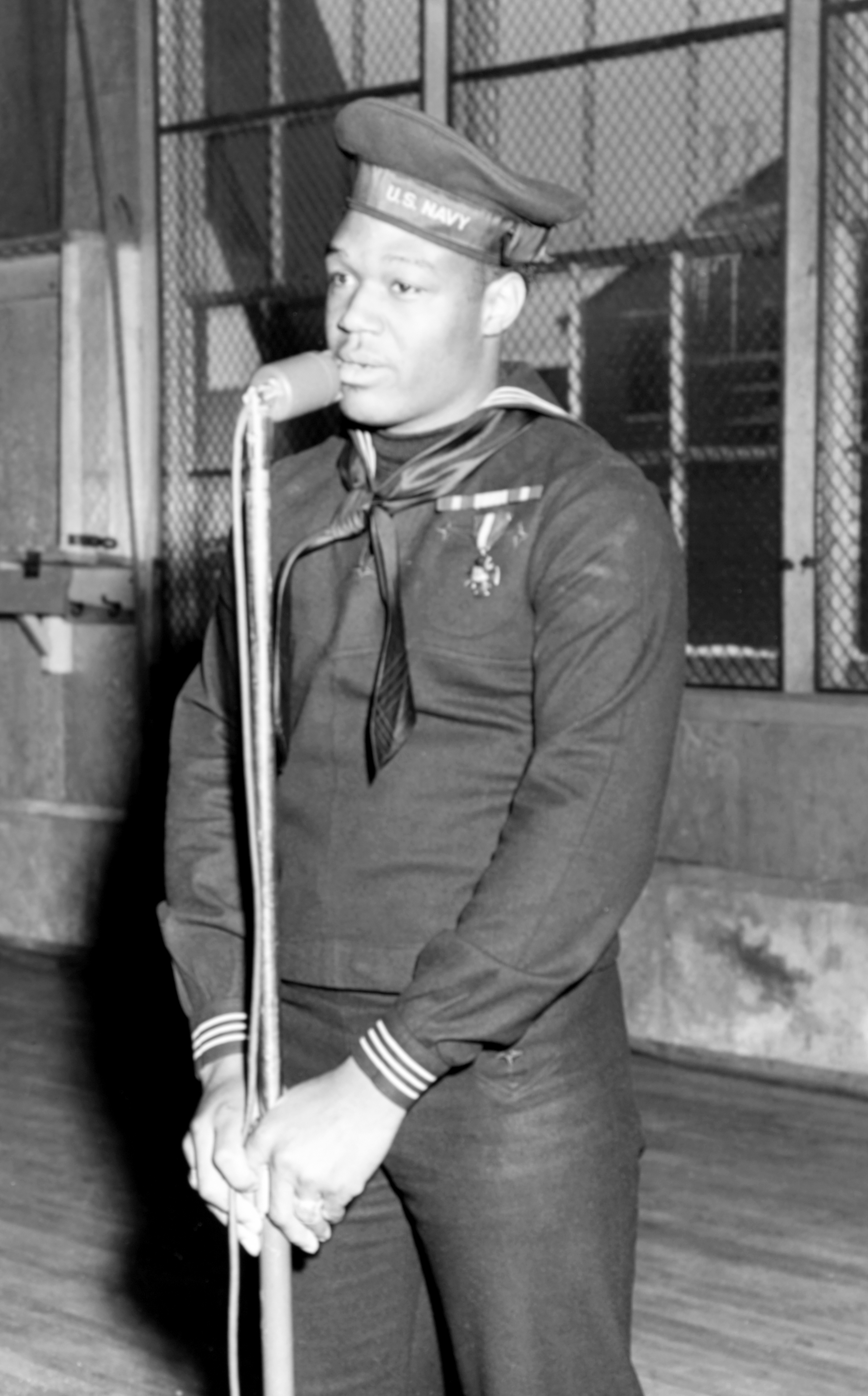
Miller speaking at Great Lakes Naval Training Station (January 7, 1943)

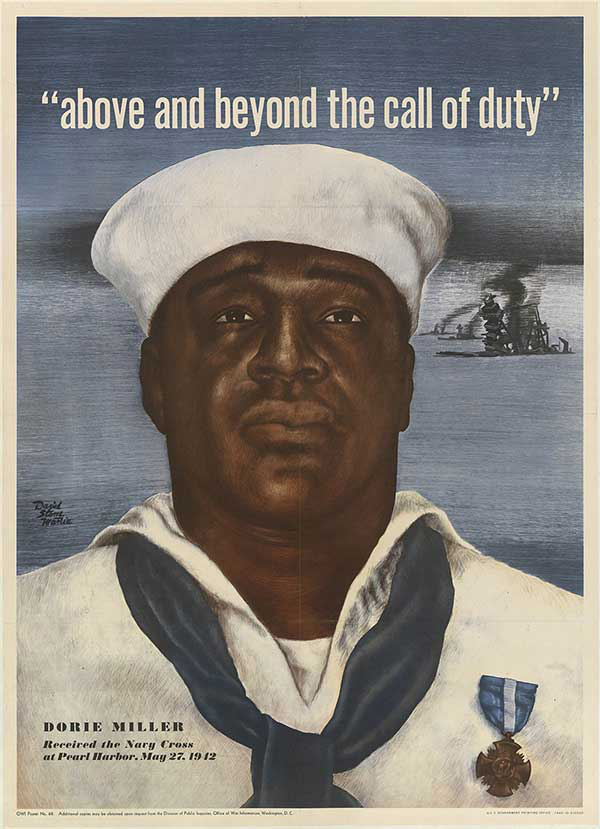
1943 U.S. Navy recruiting poster featuring Miller and his Navy Cross

Miller advanced in rating to Mess Attendant First Class on June 1, 1942. On June 27 the Pittsburgh Courier called for him to be allowed to return home for a war bond tour along with white war heroes. On July 25 the Pittsburgh Courier ran a photo of Miller with the caption, "He Fought ... Keeps Mop" next to a photo of a white survivor of the Pearl Harbor attack receiving an officer's commission. The photo caption stated that the Navy felt that Miller was "too important waiting tables in the Pacific" for him to return to the United States. On November 23 Miller returned to Pearl Harbor and was ordered on a war bond tour while still attached to the Indianapolis. In December 1942 and January 1943 he gave presentations in Oakland, California, in his hometown of Waco, in Dallas, and to the first graduating class of Black sailors from Great Lakes Naval Training Station.

Miller was featured on the 1943 U.S. Navy recruiting poster Above and Beyond the Call of Duty, designed by David Stone Martin.

In February 1943, the Navy changed the title Mess Attendant to Steward's Mate. On May 15, Miller reported to Puget Sound Navy Yard at Bremerton, Washington, assigned to the newly constructed escort carrier Liscome Bay (CVE-56). He was advanced in rating to Cook Third Class on June 1. The ship had a crew of 960 men, and its primary functions were to serve as a convoy escort, to provide aircraft for close air support during amphibious landing operations, and to ferry aircraft to naval bases and fleet carriers at sea. The Liscome Bay was the flagship for Carrier Division 24 which was under the command of Rear Admiral Henry M. Mullinnix. On October 22, Liscome Bay set sail for Pearl Harbor.

== Death ==
After training in Hawaiian waters, Liscome Bay left Pearl Harbor on November 10, 1943, to join the Northern Task Force, Task Group 52. Miller's carrier took part in the Battle of Makin (invasion of Makin by units of the Army's 165th Regimental Combat Team, 27th Infantry Division) which had begun on November 20. On November 24, the day after Makin was captured by American soldiers and the eve of Thanksgiving (the cooks had broken out the frozen turkeys from Pearl Harbor), Liscome Bay was cruising near Butaritari (Makin Atoll's main island) when it was struck just before dawn in the stern by a torpedo from the Japanese submarine I-175 (which fired four torpedoes at Task Group 5312). The carrier's own torpedoes and aircraft bombs exploded, causing the ship to sink in 23 minutes. There were 272 survivors from the crew of over 900, but Miller was among the two-thirds of the crew listed as "presumed dead". His parents were informed that he was missing in action on December 7, 1943. Liscome Bay was the only ship lost in the Gilbert Islands operation.

A memorial service was held for Miller on April 30, 1944, at the Second Baptist Church in Waco, Texas, sponsored by the Victory Club. On May 28, a granite marker was dedicated at Moore High School in Waco to honor him. Miller was officially declared dead by the Navy on November 25, 1944, a year and a day after the loss of Liscome Bay. One of his brothers also served during World War II.

== Military awards ==
Miller's decorations and awards:

1st Row	Navy Cross		Purple Heart (posthumous)
2nd Row	Combat Action Ribbon (posthumous)	Good Conduct Medal	American Defense Service Medal with "FLEET" clasp (bronze star)
3rd Row	American Campaign Medal	Asiatic-Pacific Campaign Medal with two bronze stars	World War II Victory Medal (posthumous)

=== Navy Cross citation ===
For distinguished devotion to duty, extraordinary courage and disregard for his own personal safety during the attack on the Fleet in Pearl Harbor, Territory of Hawaii, by Japanese forces on December 7, 1941. While at the side of his Captain on the bridge, Miller, despite enemy strafing and bombing and in the face of a serious fire, assisted in moving his Captain, who had been mortally wounded, to a place of greater safety, and later manned and operated a machine gun directed at enemy Japanese attacking aircraft until ordered to leave the bridge.

== Legacy ==
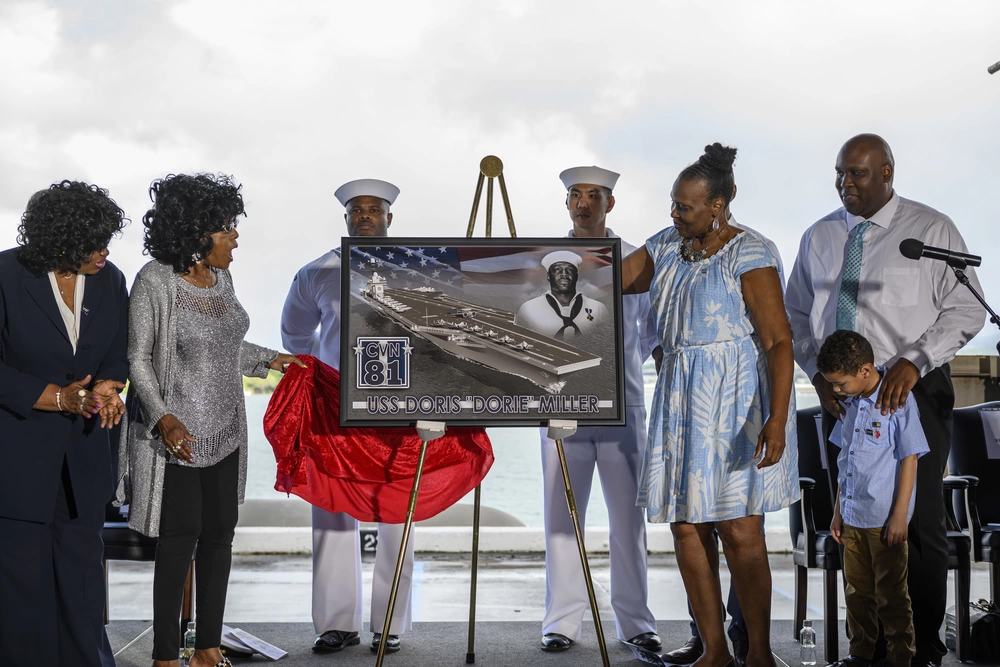
Members of Doris Miller's family and U.S. Navy personnel unveil the design concept for the future aircraft carrier USS Doris Miller (CVN-81) during the ship's naming ceremony in January 2020.

=== USS Doris Miller (CVN-81) ===
On January 20, 2020, acting Secretary of the Navy Thomas B. Modly named a future Gerald R. Ford-class aircraft carrier the USS Doris Miller (CVN-81) in a naming ceremony at Pearl Harbor, Hawaii. It will be the first aircraft carrier named for an African American, and it will also be the first aircraft carrier to be named in honor of a Sailor for actions while serving in the enlisted ranks. The ship is scheduled to be laid down in 2026 and launched in 2029.

In August 2026, CNN reported that the U.S. Navy was considering renaming CVN-81 and naming a different warship in Miller's honor instead. Two sources familiar with the discussions told CNN that naming CVN-81 after President Donald Trump had been considered, although no decision on a new name had been made. The Department of Defense stated that it had "nothing to announce at this time".

=== Memorials ===
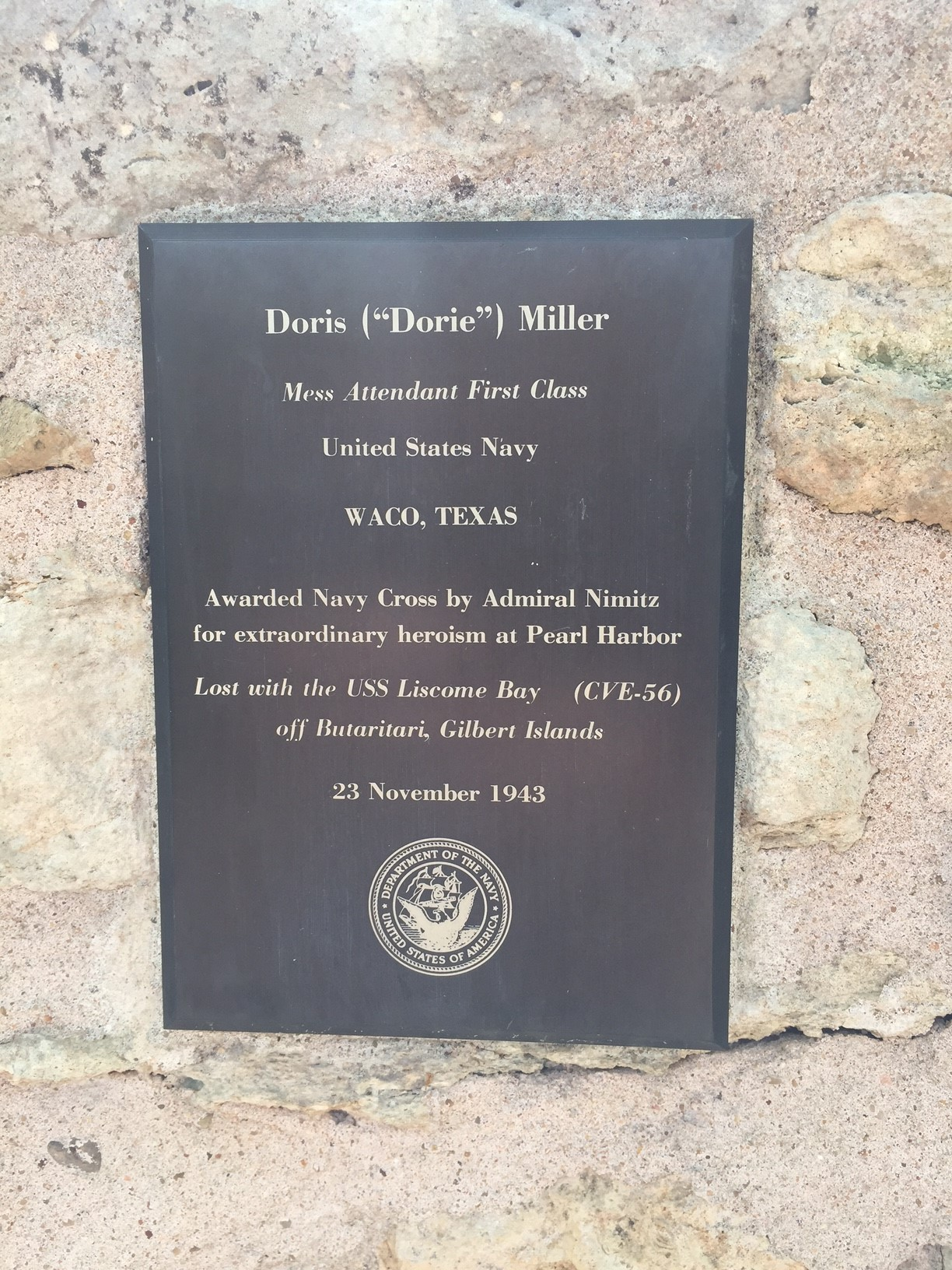
Commemorative plaque at the National Museum of the Pacific War

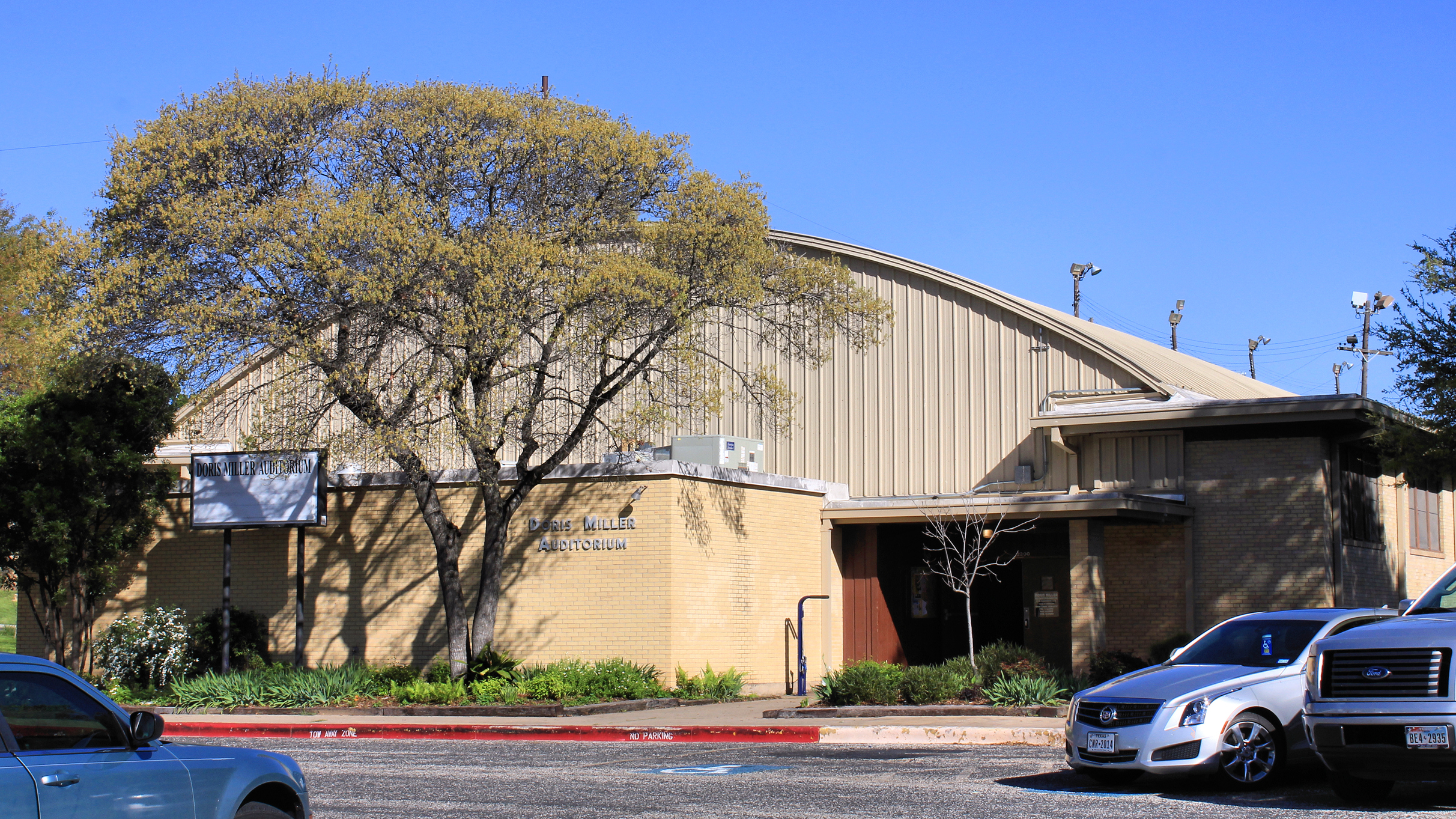
Doris Miller Auditorium in Austin, Texas

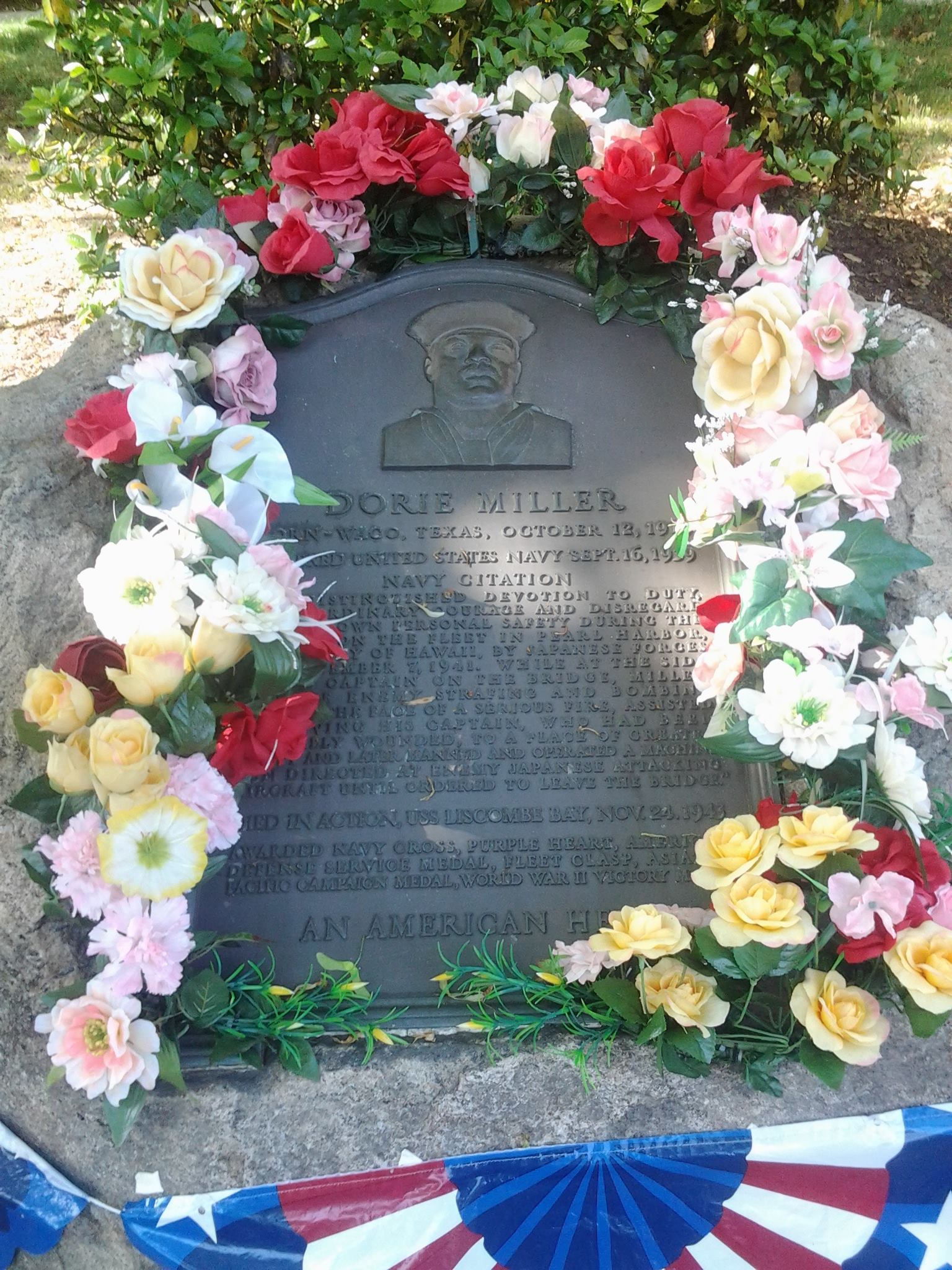
Dorie Miller memorial at the housing cooperative named for him in Corona, Queens

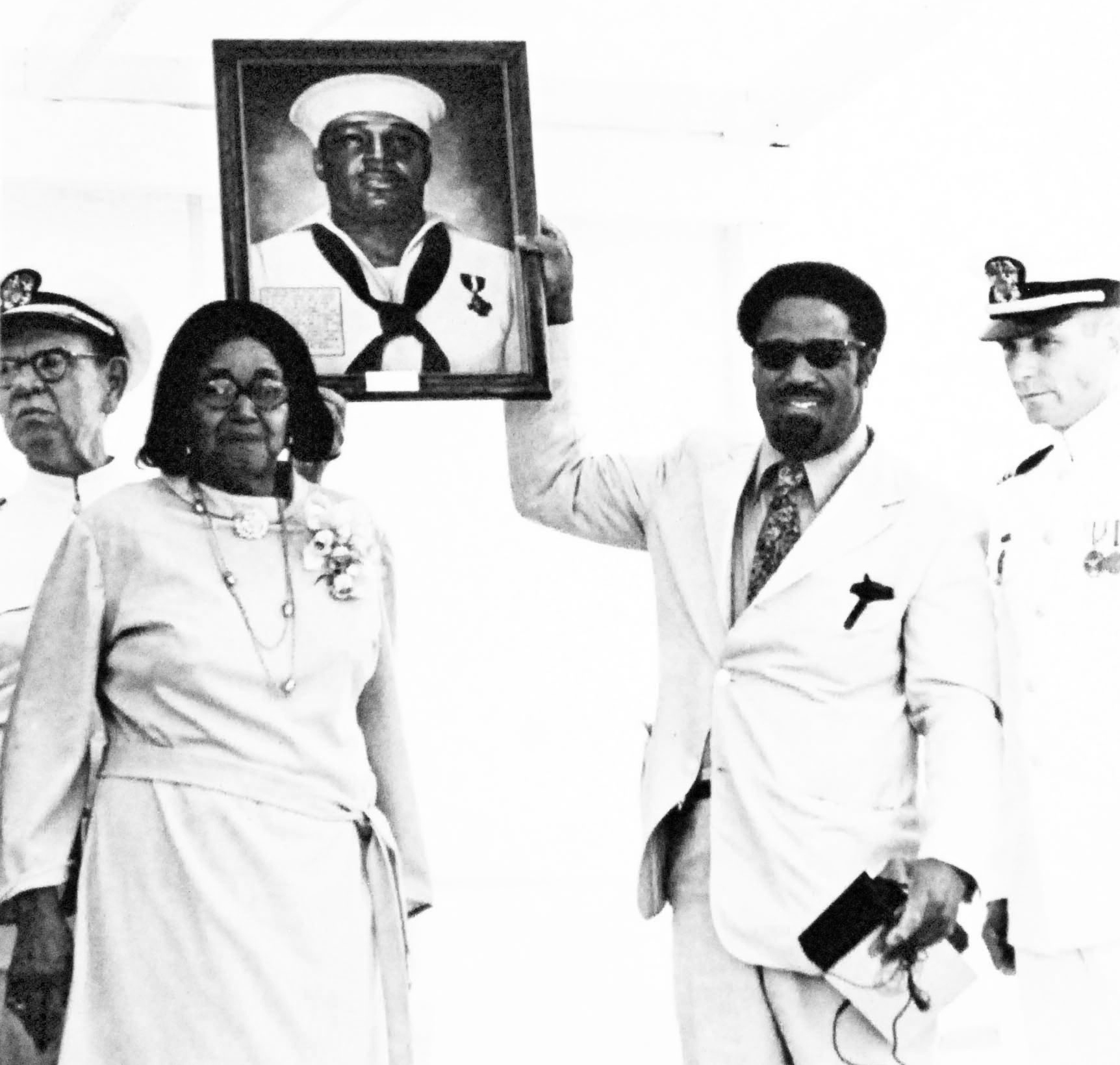
Henrietta Miller, mother of Doris Miller and sponsor for the USS Miller (FF-1091), attending its commissioning ceremony on June 30, 1973

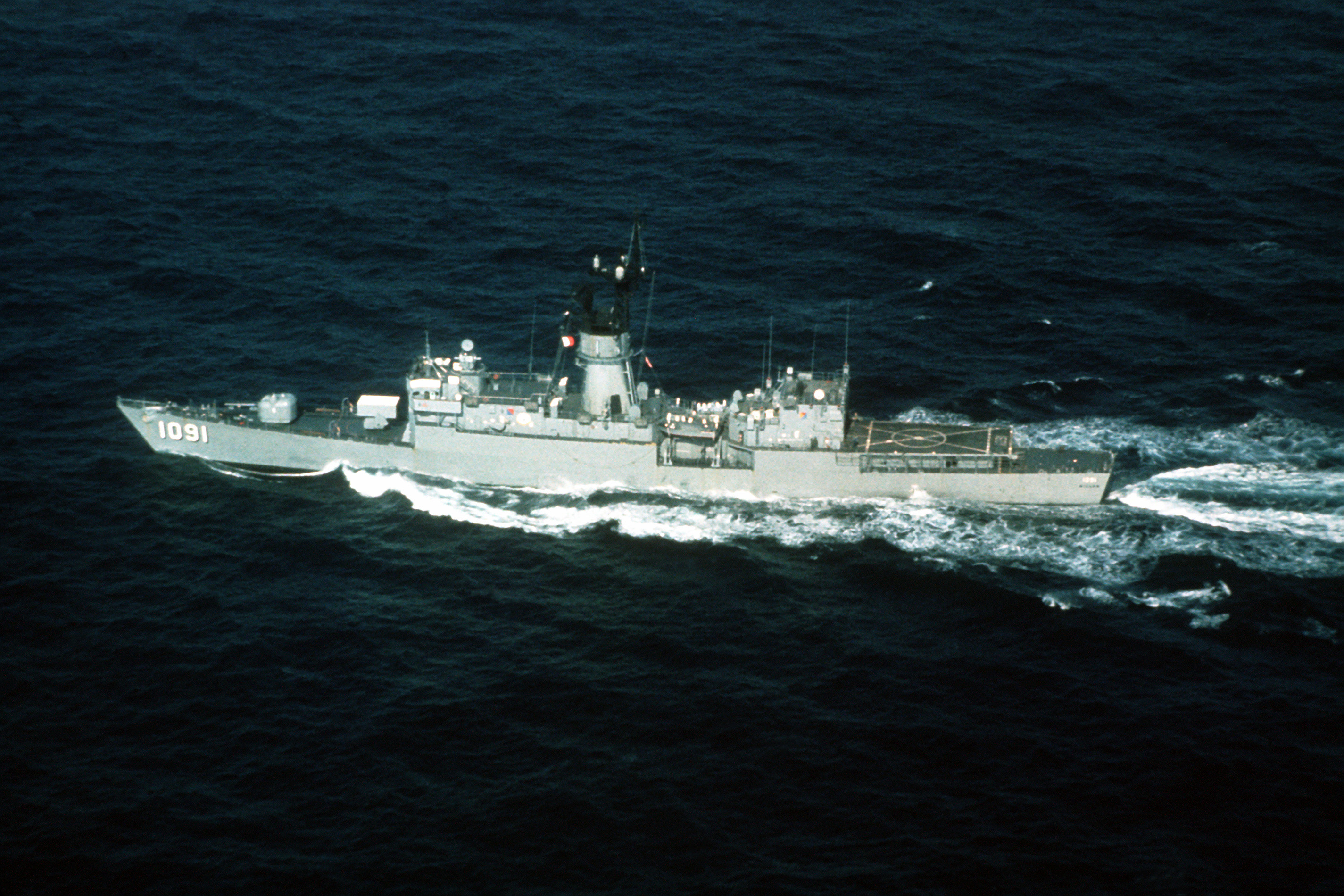
USS Miller (FF-1091), named in honor of Doris Miller, in February 1991

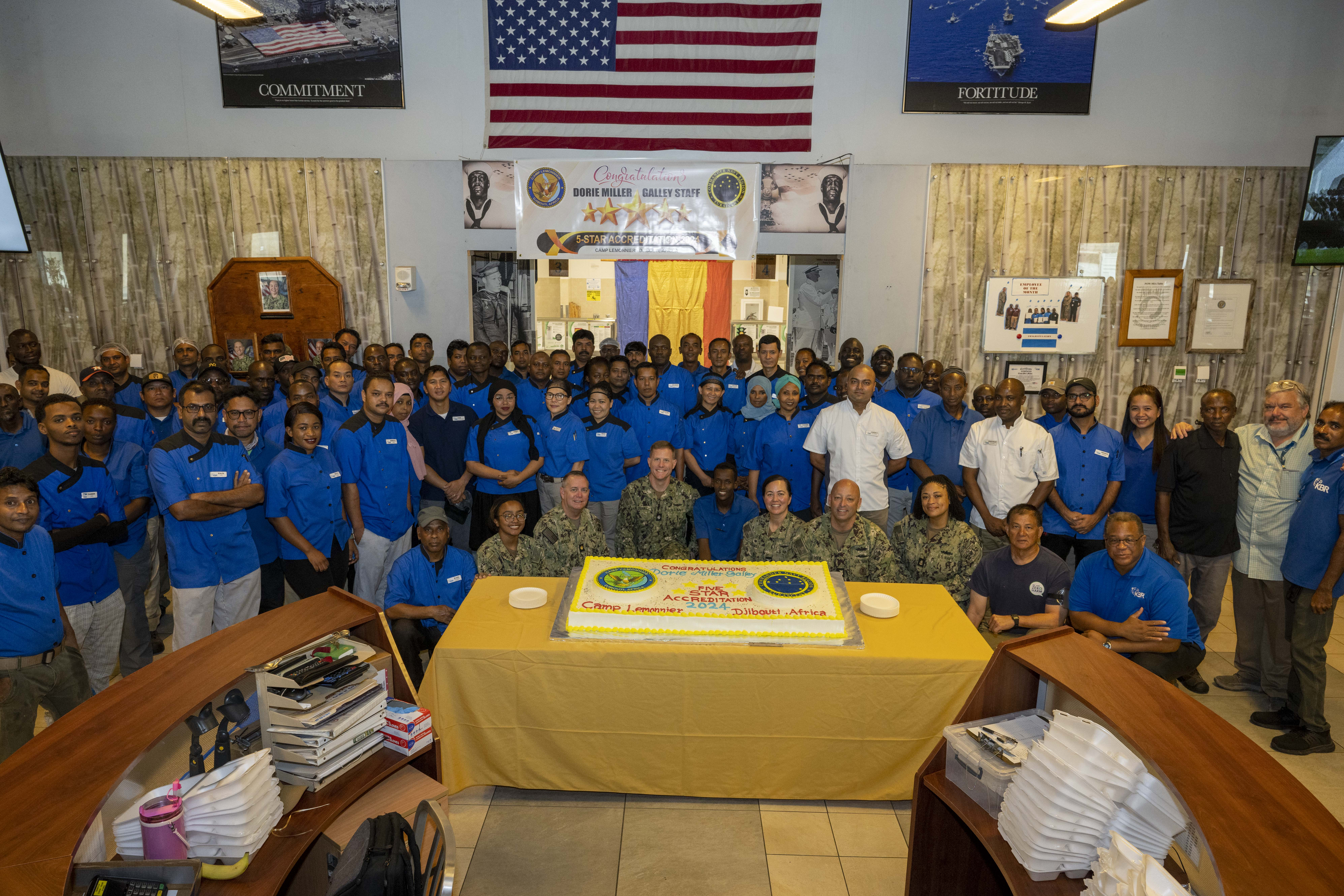
Doris Miller Galley, Camp Lemonnier, Djibouti

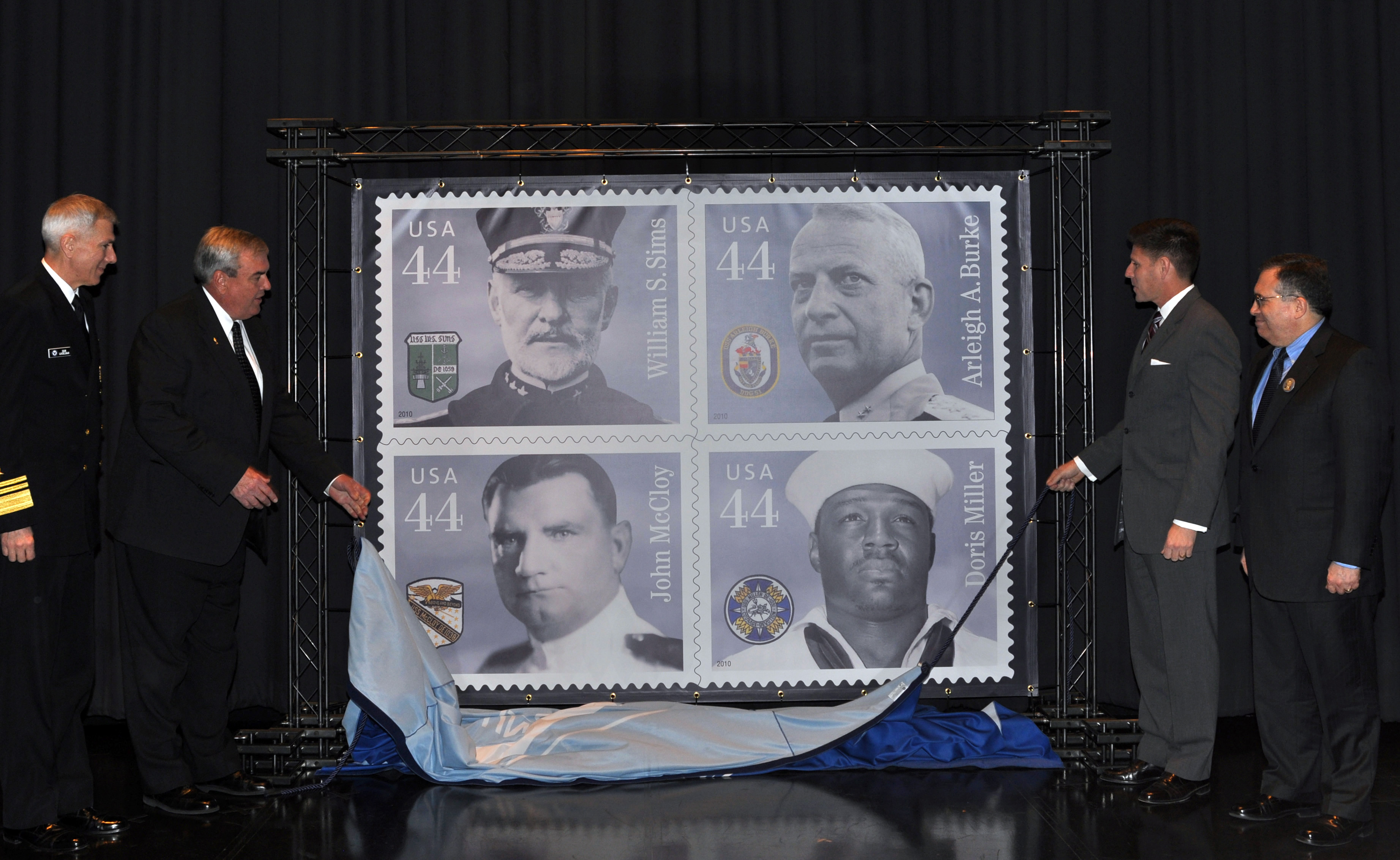
Distinguished Sailors commemorative stamp series ceremony at the United States Navy Memorial (2010), with Miller's stamp at lower right

- Doris Miller Memorial, a public art installation on the banks of the Brazos River in Waco. A nine-foot bronze statue was unveiled on December 7, 2017.
- A bronze commemorative plaque at the Doris Miller Park housing community located near Naval Station Pearl Harbor; organized by the Alpha Kappa Alpha sorority and dedicated on October 12, 1991, which would have been Miller's 72nd birthday.
- Plaque in the Memorial Courtyard at the National Museum of the Pacific War in Fredericksburg, Texas.

=== Schools ===
- Dorie Miller Intermediate School, Ennis, Texas
- Doris Miller Elementary School, San Antonio, Texas (opened 1947)
- Doris Miller Elementary School, San Diego, California (dedicated April 28, 1976)
- Dorie Miller Elementary School, Waco, Texas (closed 2012)
- Doris Miller Middle School, San Marcos, Texas

=== Community-related ===
- Bledsoe–Miller Community Center, recreation facility in Waco, Texas, jointly named for Jules Bledsoe
- Dorie Miller Community Center, recreation facility in San Antonio, Texas
- Dorie Miller Drive, Champaign, Illinois
- Dorie Miller Homes, a housing community in Gary, Indiana
- Dorie Miller Houses, a housing cooperative complex built in 1953 in the Corona neighborhood of Queens, New York
- Dorie Miller Park, Lewisburg, West Virginia
- Doris Miller Auditorium, Rosewood Park, Austin, Texas
- Doris Miller Community Center, Newport News, Virginia
- Doris Miller Family YMCA, Waco, Texas
- Doris Miller Loop, Honolulu, Hawaii, with a monument located at north end of street
- Doris Miller Memorial Park, a cemetery on the border of Waco and Bellmead, Texas
- Dorie Miller Recreation Center, San Antonio, Texas

=== Military-related ===
- USS Miller (FF-1091), a destroyer escort (reclassified as a Knox-class frigate on June 30, 1975) commissioned on June 30, 1973; decommissioned on October 15, 1991, was named after him.
- The Bachelor Enlisted Quarters at Naval Station Great Lakes was dedicated to Miller on December 7, 1971.
- Dorie Miller Galley, the main galley for Camp Lemonnier in Djibouti
- Doris Miller Dining Hall, Naval Air Station Chase Field, Beeville, Texas
- Doris Miller Park, a housing community for military personnel in Honolulu
- USS Doris Miller (CVN-81), a future Gerald R. Ford-class aircraft carrier, announced on January 19, 2020.

=== Veteran-related ===
- Dorie Miller Chapter 14 – Disabled American Veterans chapter in Washington, D.C.
- Dorie Miller Post 546 – American Legion post in Racine, Wisconsin
- Dorie Miller Post 915 – American Legion post in Chicago
- Dorie E. Miller Post 817 – American Legion post in Beaumont, Texas
- Doris Miller Department of Veterans Affairs Medical Center in Waco, Texas; includes monument and a road named Doris Miller Circle.

=== Radio ===
- In 1942, Miller's actions were dramatized on the CBS Radio series They Live Forever.
- The April 25, 1944, episode of the CBS Radio series Columbia Presents Corwin, titled "Dorie Got a Medal", starred Canada Lee and Josh White in Norman Corwin's "jazz-and-jive opera" about Miller.
- On the December 9, 1945, broadcast of his ABC radio series Orson Welles Commentaries, Welles presented a tribute to Doris Miller and spoke with his father, Conery Miller. Broadcast from the U. S. Naval Training and Distribution Center on Treasure Island, San Francisco, the program announced the naming of three theater complexes to honor three World War II heroes killed in action. Theater One was named for Doris Miller; the other two theaters were named for Medal of Honor recipients John Basilone and Edward O'Hare.

=== Film and television ===
- Elven Havard portrays Miller in the 1970 film Tora! Tora! Tora!.
- Cuba Gooding Jr. portrays Miller in the 2001 film Pearl Harbor.
- The presentation of the Navy Cross to Miller is depicted in the 2019 film Midway.
- Abdul Sulaiman portrays Miller in an episode of the National Geographic TV series Erased: WWII Heroes of Colour (2024).

=== Other ===
- Founded in 1943, the Dorie Miller Foundation began giving an annual award in 1947 to an individual or group considered outstanding in the field of race relations. Recipients included Jackie Robinson, Jesse Owens, and Eleanor Roosevelt. The award later became the American Heritage & Freedom Award.
- The Gwendolyn Brooks poem Negro Hero (1945) is narrated from Miller's point of view.
- In 2002, Molefi Kete Asante included Miller on his list of 100 Greatest African Americans.
- Miller was honored by the United States Postal Service as one of four Distinguished Sailors, with a 44-cent commemorative stamp issued on February 4, 2010. Also honored were William Sims, Arleigh Burke, and John McCloy.
