= Henry M. Mullinnix =

United States Navy admiral

Henry Maston Mullinnix
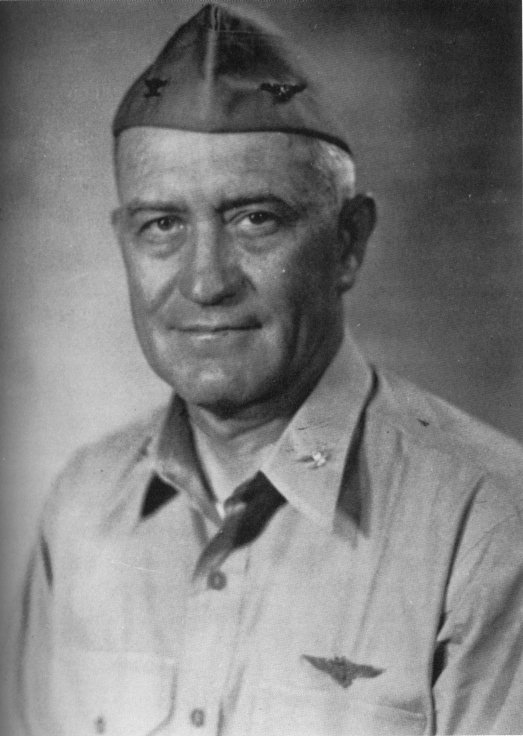
- Born: July 4, 1892; Spencer, Indiana, U.S.
- Died: November 24, 1943 (aged 51) off Makin Island
- Military career
- Allegiance: United States of America
- Branch: United States Navy
- Service years: 1916–1943
- Rank: Rear Admiral
- Commands: USS Albemarle; USS Saratoga; Carrier Division 24; Task Group 52.3
- Conflicts: World War I World War II: Battle of Makin †
- Awards: Legion of Merit w/ Combat "V"; Navy and Marine Corps Commendation Medal; Purple Heart; Combat Action Ribbon

Henry Maston Mullinnix (July 4, 1892 – November 24, 1943) was a United States Navy aviator and admiral who served in World War I and World War II. Mullinnix was killed in action while commanding a Navy escort carrier division and task force group when his flagship, the escort carrier USS Liscome Bay (CVE-56), was sunk by a Japanese submarine near the Gilbert Islands during World War II. He was the fourth of five US Navy admirals killed in battle during WWII, including: Isaac C. Kidd (1941, Attack on Pearl Harbor); Norman Scott and Daniel J. Callaghan (same day, 1942, Naval Battle of Guadalcanal); and Theodore E. Chandler (1945, invasion of Lingayen Gulf).

== Biography ==
Mullinnix was born in Spencer, Indiana in 1892. He was president of his senior class at Attica High School where his father was a Principal, graduating in 1909. He graduated first in his class from the United States Naval Academy in 1916. He served in the destroyer Balch (DD-50), engaged in patrol and escort duty off Ireland during World War I. Following service in Gridley (DD-92) and Brooks (DD-232), he completed work in aeronautical engineering at Annapolis and MIT, receiving an M.S. degree in 1923. After flight training at Naval Air Station Pensacola, Florida, he was designated a naval aviator on January 11, 1924. He was one of those mainly responsible for developing the air-cooled engine for naval aircraft. Besides various shore duty, he served in Saratoga (CV-3), Wright (AV-1), and commanded Albemarle (AV-5), between 1924 and 1941. On November 13, 1942, he was promoted to rear admiral.

Mullinnix commanded Saratoga from April 1943, until August 22, when he was transferred to duty with a carrier division. On November 24, Rear Admiral Mullinnix was on board his flagship Liscome Bay (CVE-56) (under the command of Captain Irving Wiltsie) commanding Carrier Division 24 and Task Group 52.3 (Air Support Group of Northern Attack Force (Makin)-Task Group 52) when the escort carrier/flagship which had just participated in the Battle of Makin was torpedoed by a Japanese submarine and sunk off Makin Island, in the Gilbert Islands. Declared dead a year later, he was posthumously awarded the Legion of Merit:

For exceptional meritorious conduct...as Commander of a Carrier Air Support Group prior to and during the amphibious invasion of Japanese-held Makin Atoll, Gilbert Islands from November 1 to 24, 1943. Displaying outstanding initiative and superior executive ability, Rear Admiral Mullinnix skillfully conducted anti-submarine and air combat patrols supporting our landing operations on this strongly defended island and, through his brilliant leadership, enabled escort carriers to carry out a well coordinated, aggressive attack against the enemy. Rear Admiral Mullinnix's tireless efforts, meticulous attention to detail and loyal devotion to the accomplishment of an extremely difficult and hazardous mission contributed materially to our subsequent capture of this strategic area.

== Namesake ==
In 1957, the destroyer USS Mullinnix (DD-944) was named in his honor.
