= USS Wiltsie =

Gearing-class destroyer

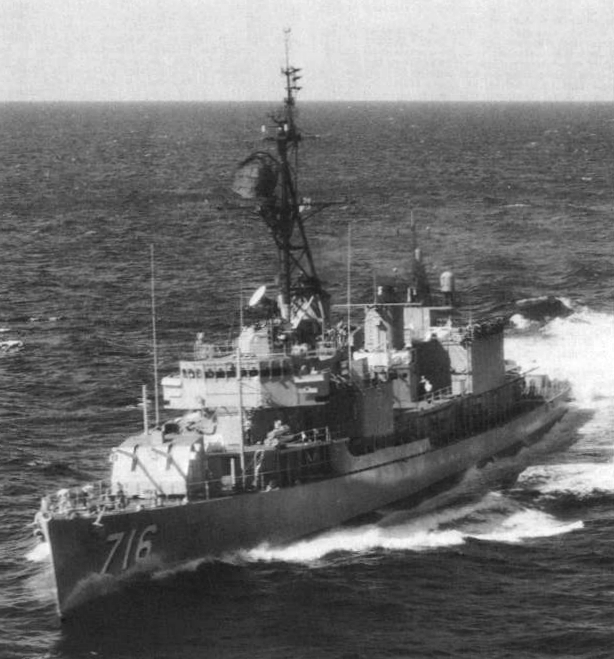
- USS Wiltsie (DD-716) underway at sea, circa 1960s

History

United States
- Name: USS Wiltsie
- Namesake: Irving Wiltsie
- Laid down: 13 March 1945
- Launched: 31 August 1945
- Commissioned: 12 January 1946
- Modernized: September 1962 (FRAM IB)
- Decommissioned: 23 January 1976
- Stricken: 23 January 1976
- Identification: Callsign: NTPC; Hull number: DD-716
- Fate: Sold to Pakistan, 29 April 1977

Pakistan
- Name: PNS Tariq
- Acquired: 1977
- Renamed: Nazim (1990)
- Identification: D165
- Status: Alongside as "at sea" headquarters of Pakistan Maritime Security Agency

General characteristics In US service
- Class & type: Gearing-class destroyer
- Displacement: 2,425 long tons (2,464 t) (standard); 3,460 long tons (3,520 t) (full)
- Length: 390 ft 6 in (119.0 m) (overall)
- Beam: 40 ft 10 in (12.45 m)
- Draft: 14 ft 4 in (4.37 m)
- Propulsion: 2 × geared turbines; 2 × propellers
- Speed: 35 kn (65 km/h; 40 mph)
- Range: 4,500 nmi (8,300 km; 5,200 mi) at 20 kn (37 km/h; 23 mph)
- Complement: 336 officers and enlisted
- Armament: 6 × 5 in (127 mm)/38 caliber guns; 12 × 40 mm (1.6 in) Bofors AA guns; 11 × 20 mm (0.79 in) Oerlikon AA cannons; 10 × 21 in (533 mm) torpedo tubes; 6 × depth charge projectors; 2 × depth charge tracks

USS Wiltsie (DD-716) was a Gearing-class destroyer in the United States Navy. She was named for Irving Wiltsie. The destroyer entered service in 1946 and remained active with the United States Navy until 1977, when Wiltsie was decommissioned and sold to Pakistan in 1977. The vessel entered service with the Pakistan Navy as PNS Tariq (D165) in 1978. In 1990, the ship was renamed PNS Nazim to allow the name Tariq to be given to a newly-acquired Type 21 frigate. The ship was then transferred to the Pakistan Maritime Security Agency and used as an alongside "at sea" headquarters for the agency. Though afloat, the vessel no longer sails.

== Service history ==
Wiltsie was laid down on 13 March 1945 at Port Newark, New Jersey, by the Federal Shipbuilding and Drydock Company. The destroyer was launched on 31 August 1945, sponsored by Mrs. Irving D. Wiltsie, the widow of Captain Wiltsie. The vessel was commissioned on 12 January 1946 at the New York Naval Shipyard, Brooklyn, New York.

=== 1946–1950 ===
Following a shakedown cruise which took the ship to Guantanamo Bay, Cuba, Wiltsie transited the Panama Canal on 8 July 1946 and proceeded to San Diego, California. She spent the fall and winter of 1946 engaged in training exercises before departing the west coast on 6 January 1947, bound for the Far East. She subsequently operated out of Qingdao, China, on exercises and maneuvers while standing by the American community in that port during rising local tensions between the communist and Nationalist Chinese. Wiltsie remained at Qingdao until June 1947, when she shifted to Sasebo, Japan, for occupation duty. Departing Sasebo on 8 March 1948, the destroyer proceeded to Bremerton, Washington, for an overhaul at the Puget Sound Naval Shipyard.

After training off the west coast, Wiltsie sailed once more for the Far East, departing San Diego on 1 October. Late that autumn, she again operated out of Qingdao during the evacuation of Americans from that port to Yokohama because of the Chinese Civil War then raging. During this period, Wiltsie briefly visited Hong Kong and Okinawa before returning to Qingdao.

Chinese Communist forces rolled southward, and Nanking fell in April 1949. Wiltsie arrived at Shanghai on 22 April, to stand by during the evacuation of all foreign nationals from the city. Over the ensuing days, Wiltsie watched a veritable parade of merchant vessels of many nationalities—Chinese, Dutch, Norwegian, French, Danish, British, and American—as well as American, British, and Chinese naval vessels. On 5 May 1949, 20 days before the fall of the city to the communists, Wiltsie departed Chinese waters for the last time, bound for Buckner Bay, Okinawa.

From there, Wiltsie soon headed homeward and made port at San Diego on 4 June 1949. She later moved up the coast; embarked NROTC midshipmen at Treasure Island, near San Francisco, California on 1 August; and departed the following day for a training cruise to Balboa, Panama, and the Galápagos Islands. Returning to San Diego on 31 August, the destroyer soon sailed for Hawaii, where she participated in Operation "Miki", a mock invasion of the Hawaiian Islands in which Army, Navy, and Air Force units all took part. Returning to the west coast soon afterwards, Wiltsie spent the period from December 1949 to April 1950 at the Mare Island Naval Shipyard, Vallejo, California, undergoing an overhaul.

=== 1950–1953 (Korean War) ===
In July 1950, Wiltsie sailed for the Far East to augment the American naval presence in Korean waters.

On the evening of 16 August, USS Helena, with four landing ship tanks (LSTs) and escorting destroyers, closed the coast. Captain J. R. Clark, Commander, Destroyer Division 111, embarked in the recently arrived Wiltsie, assumed direction of the embarkation operation for the Republic of Korea (ROK) troops. He ordered the four LSTs to beach at a pre-arranged site, guided in by jeep headlights from shore. Before sunrise the next day, 327 officers and 3,480 soldiers of the ROK 3rd Division, 1,260 civilians, and 100 vehicles had been loaded.

American forces went ashore at Inchon on 15 September 1950. Wiltsie participated in one phase of this assault, screening the fast aircraft carriers of Task Force 77 (TF 77)— USS Philippine Sea, USS Valley Forge, and USS Boxer—as their aircraft hit enemy ground targets to support the advance of troops ashore. For the remainder of the deployment, Wiltsie supported United Nations troops ashore with call-fire support; screened TF 77 as it conducted air strikes against supply lines and troop concentrations; and patrolled in the Taiwan Strait.

Wiltsie returned to San Diego in March 1951, underwent repairs at Long Beach, California and subsequently departed the west coast for her fourth tour of duty in the Far East. In Korean waters, she resumed her screening, call-fire, and interdiction duties. Highlighting her blockading activities of Wonsan, Wiltsie fired retaliatory gunfire missions against enemy shore batteries.

Wiltsie returned to the west coast late in 1952, but soon found herself back in the Far East for her third Korean War deployment. After leaving the west coast on 2 January 1953, the destroyer patrolled the Formosa Strait for a time and operated off the North Korean coast before shifting to Wonsan. The Navy continued it operations to support UN ground troops, interdicted enemy supply lines by air and by surface gunfire, and blockaded the enemy's coasts.

Eight days after Wiltsie and USS Theodore E. Chandler had destroyed a train near Tanchon on 3 June, enemy shore batteries took Wiltsie under fire off Wonsan, lobbing 45 105-millimeter (4.1 in) shells in her direction, scoring a hit on the destroyer's fantail. The ship suffered no casualties and soon resumed her local patrol operations. On 15 June, Wiltsie evacuated 13 Korean civilians from Yo-do Island to Sokcho-ri.

While preparing to abandon the Wonsan siege in accordance with the armistice stipulations, Wiltsie screened minesweeping operations and joined in the last-minute shelling of enemy ground targets. In company with USS Porter and USS Bremerton, Wiltsie shelled targets at Wonsan until a few minutes before the 2200 deadline. On 27 July 1953, the Korean armistice finally came into effect. However, Wiltsie remained in Korean waters, screening the continuing minesweeping operations between Hungnam and Wonsan until 6 August 1953.

== 1953–1961 ==
Wiltsie conducted seven Western Pacific deployments between 1953 and 1961. During each tour, she carried out training and patrol assignments in Far Eastern waters, operating off the coasts of Japan, Korea, and Okinawa; visiting such ports as Yokosuka, Kobe, and Sasebo, Japan; Hong Kong; and Philippine ports such as Olongapo and Manila. Also during this time, she plane-guarded for fast carrier task forces, patrolled the Taiwan Strait, and undertook antisubmarine warfare and gunnery training exercises.

Between deployments to WestPac and the Far East, Wiltsie underwent regular overhaul and repair periods at the Long Beach Naval Shipyard. In addition, she conducted an NROTC midshipman training cruise; visited Seattle, Washington, and Esquimalt, British Columbia; and visited Melbourne, Australia, in May 1959 to celebrate the anniversary of the Battle of the Coral Sea.

== 1961–1964 ==
In November 1961, Wiltsie began a 10-month scheduled overhaul at the Pearl Harbor Naval Shipyard, Pearl Harbor, in which she underwent Fleet Rehabilitation and Modernization (FRAM) alterations. She received an enclosed bridge; a helicopter hangar and landing platform; triple-mounted Mk. 32 torpedo tubes; an ASROC launcher; and late model radar and sonar. She also received many improvements in accommodations for both officers and enlisted men. Following this "face lift", Wiltsie conducted refresher training and upkeep before becoming flagship of DesDiv 72, home-ported in San Diego.

Following sonar calibrations at Puget Sound, Wiltsie spent one week off southern California, participating in exercises. After the conclusion of this maneuver, Wiltsie departed the west coast for the Far East, leaving San Diego on 18 May 1963. Arriving at Yokosuka on 6 June, via Pearl Harbor and Midway, Wiltsie soon got underway for a 30-day Taiwan Strait mission. During this time, she visited Keelung and Kaohsiung, Formosa. Her scheduled rest period at Hong Kong at the end of the assignment had to be cancelled because of a typhoon.

Returning to Yokosuka for upkeep on 30 July, Wiltsie departed in early August for participation in Exercise "Tire Iron." Wiltsie subsequently operated out of Sasebo and Yokosuka into the fall of 1963; she departed Sasebo on 29 October and operated briefly with TG 77.6 until 10 November, when she was detached to return home. After a stop at Pearl Harbor, the destroyer made port at San Diego on 24 November.

In January 1964, Wiltsie joined USS Ticonderoga, Theodore E. Chandler, and USS Henderson in anti-aircraft warfare exercises off the west coast and served as a plane guard for the carrier. She subsequently moved westward to the middle Pacific with Ticonderoga and arrived at Pearl Harbor on 18 February. After completing her exercises in Hawaiian waters, she returned to the west coast in the spring and participated in anti-submarine and anti-air warfare training with USS Yorktown and USS Coral Sea.

In June, Wiltsie embarked midshipmen for a six-week training program and later underwent ten days of hull repairs at Long Beach. Later in the month, she participated in exercises in support of Marine Corps units engaged in night reconnaissance and in amphibious and paratroop landing training at San Clemente Island and at Camp Del Mar, California.

Drydocked during August and September for hull and sonar dome repair, Wiltsie put to sea soon afterwards for tests and trials of her DASH (drone antisubmarine helicopter) qualification system which ended successfully on 3 November. The destroyer subsequently participated in Operation "Union Square", an extensive fleet exercise, before returning to San Diego to prepare for the ship's 14th WestPac deployment.

=== 1965–1969 ===
Wiltsie sailed for the western Pacific on 5 January 1965, in company with the 16 other ships of Cruiser Destroyer Flotilla 7. Wiltsie was diverted to duty with Coral Sea and USS Hancock during bombing raids on Viet Cong (VC) positions in South Vietnam in February.

The destroyer spent 69 of the next 80 days at sea in Vietnamese waters in a variety of roles, including antisubmarine warfare screening ship, plane guard destroyer, and early warning picket ship. In March, before proceeding to Hong Kong, she shadowed a Russian intelligence ship which was gathering information on American task groups.

Wiltsie again sailed for Vietnam and operated with TG 71.1 on Operation Market Time, engaged in patrolling the South Vietnamese coastline. In May and June, Wiltsie conducted several gunfire support missions against VC supply depots and troop concentrations in South Vietnam. During this deployment, Wiltsie transferred 64.2 short tons (58.2 t) of stores from USS Mars by the vertical replenishment method.

Following a visit to Japan in mid-June, Wiltsie returned to the United States, arriving at San Diego on 2 July. Wiltsie next underwent a period of repairs and refresher training which carried over into 1966. After taking part in training evolutions off the west coast in the spring, Wiltsie again headed for the Orient on 4 June 1966. While at Guam for a refueling stop, the destroyer suffered slight damage on 22 June when a fuel barge collided with the ship, necessitating repairs which delayed her for 15 hours. On 2 July, Wiltsie commenced duty with TU 70.8.9, a naval gunfire support unit.

After a brief period of upkeep, Wiltsie proceeded to the northern search and rescue (SAR) station, approximately 50 miles (80 km) east of the North Vietnamese port of Haiphong, to stand by with Towers ready to recover downed airmen. For two periods—from 31 July to 2 September and from 28 September to 1 November, Wiltsie patrolled the northern search and rescue (SAR) station. In August and again in October, the destroyer participated in rescues from the waters off the North Vietnamese coast, saving a total of nine men. The ship acted as a refueling vessel for units of Helicopter Squadron 6. Upon completion of these SAR duties, Wiltsie prepared for its homeward voyage. The ship called at the port of Hualien, Taiwan, on 4 November, for a five-day visit. Wiltsie departed Nationalist Chinese waters on 10 November, made a fuel stop at Okinawa the next day, and arrived at Yokosuka on 14 November.

Wiltsie joined TG 77.8, based around USS Constellation, and stood out of Yokosuka on 22 November, bound for the west coast. Three days out, the task group ran into bad weather. High winds prevailed for five days, and all ships suffered moderate storm damage. The heavy seas battered open a seam forward in Wiltsie; caused three cracks in the fantail area of the main deck and the loss of two ladders; and ripped two holes in the port bow of the motor whaleboat.

An underway replenishment with USS Sacramento on the evening of 29 November turned out to be a difficult affair. Only after three separate approaches, seven fuel hose separations and seven hours alongside was the fueling completed. The ship remained blackened by oil on parts of its superstructure and hull sides until after she arrived at San Diego on 3 December. Wiltsie moored at San Diego for upkeep which would last into the new year, 1967.

Following operations off the southern California coast, Wiltsie departed San Diego on 19 September 1967. After stopovers at Pearl Harbor and Guam, the destroyer arrived at Subic Bay on 11 October. Shifting to Da Nang, South Vietnam, soon afterwards, Wiltsie moved to the northern SAR station on 21 October and shifted to the southern SAR station five days later. Typhoon Emma forced the ship to sortie from Tonkin Gulf on 5 November, before the storm abated enough to allow the ship to resume operations on 7 November.

During this tour, Wiltsie assisted in the search for two men lost overboard from USS William V. Pratt. USS King and USS Chevalier also took part, but high seas and strong winds hampered search operations and prevented any of the ships from sighting the men.

On 13 November, Wiltsie relieved USS Buck on the northern SAR station, only to be relieved in turn by USS Rogers. After rest and relaxation at Hong Kong, an upkeep alongside USS Klondike, and an in-port period at Subic Bay, Wiltsie returned to the SAR station in Tonkin Gulf, operating in company with King. During this second deployment, Wiltsie participated in six rescues involving 10 men. The first took place at 14:20 on 22 December, when an A-7 Corsair II aircraft from VA-147 went down at a position some 40 miles (64 km) northwest of King. An intensive search failed to locate the downed plane's pilot, and all search aircraft were vectored back to their base. Wiltsie refueled a helicopter during this period when the chopper approached the ship low on fuel. The Christmas cease-fire which went into effect on 25 December resulted in only photo-reconnaissance flights being run against North Vietnam; no SAR opportunities were thus presented to Wiltsie and King until 29 December, when an F-4 Phantom aircraft of VF-161 (Coral Sea) crashed 51 miles (82 km) from the northern SAR station among some islands off the coast near Haiphong. King guided a helicopter to the scene and it picked up both pilots—cold but well—and returned them to their carrier, Coral Sea.

Monsoons limited air action over the last few days of 1967 and the first few days of 1968. Two Oriskany planes went down on 10 January 1968; Wiltsie provided communications relays where necessary and closely plotted aircraft positions, while King assumed air control function and direction. The latter's UH-2 helicopter picked up two pilots from one of the planes while a logistics helicopter plucked the crewman of the second plane from the water. Later in the day, King picked up two more downed pilots, giving her a total of four for the day.

After being relieved by USS De Haven and USS Reeves, King sailed to Subic Bay and Wiltsie to Hong Kong before she, too, headed for Subic Bay, arriving on 23 January. Three days later, while at Subic Bay, Wiltsie received word of the capture of the American intelligence-gathering vessel USS Pueblo. On the following day, Wiltsie and King sailed for SAR station to relieve De Haven and Reeves a day early.

When the SAR station was shifted south, Wiltsie, King, and the PIRAZ station ship USS Belknap conducted joint patrols in the heavy weather hanging over the station. Wiltsie's SAR tour was largely uneventful, as monsoon activity curtailed American air strikes over the north, and no opportunities presented themselves to pick up airmen.

Relieved by USS Southerland on station on 17 February, Wiltsie sailed to Subic Bay where she offloaded part of her ammunition in preparation for the cruise home. Departing there on 22 February in company with Buck and King, Wiltsie made a fuel stop at Darwin and visited Brisbane from 2 to 7 March before proceeding on to the west coast of the United States.

Following stops at Pago Pago, American Samoa and Pearl Harbor, for fuel, Wiltsie moored at San Diego on 23 March and remained there into May. On 22 May, she became school ship for an engineering officers' course and performed this duty until 9 June Assigned plane guard duties for Hancock during that ship's carrier qualification evolution from 10 to 22 June, Wiltsie put her own motor whaleboat in the water on one occasion when one of the carrier's F-8 Crusader aircraft went into the water immediately after takeoff. However, Hancock's rescue helicopter effected the rescue before the destroyer's boat arrived.

On 26 June, Wiltsie sailed for San Francisco Bay to undergo an overhaul at the naval shipyard at Vallejo, California. Emerging from the yard on 6 November, Wiltsie spent the remainder of 1968 in refresher training which continued into the spring of 1969.

Departing San Diego on 16 April 1969, in company with the remainder of DesDiv 72—Buck, USS John W. Thomason, and USS Perkins—Wiltsie participated in type training evolutions with Oriskany before arriving at Pearl Harbor on 24 April. Underway again soon afterwards, bound for the ship's WestPac deployment, Wiltsie refueled at Midway, steamed on picket station ahead of Oriskany, and arrived at Subic Bay on 10 May.

Underway for Yankee Station soon afterwards, Wiltsie arrived there on 16 May and was soon shuffled between three carriers—Oriskany, USS Bon Homme Richard and Ticonderoga—within a 24-hour span, serving successively as plane guard for each. Returning to Subic Bay in company with Ticonderoga on 20 May, Wiltsie underwent a tender upkeep alongside Klondike before being shifted to Sasebo, Japan. At Sasebo from 29 May to 6 June, Wiltsie then deployed to Yankee Station to provide "shotgun" services for USS Benjamin Stoddert. When Wiltsie's evaporators broke down on the 10th, the destroyer was relieved by USS Douglas H. Fox and headed back to Sasebo for repairs.

Wiltsie subsequently operated in the Sea of Japan escorting USS Sterett for three weeks before returning to Sasebo on 13 July. Eleven days later, the destroyer departed Japanese waters, bound for the Vietnam war zone.

Wiltsie provided plane guard services for Bonhomme Richard until detached to join USS Biddle and USS Chicago on the south SAR station. After conducting anti-submarine warfare exercises en route, Wiltsie spent from 7 to 10 August on south SAR before deploying to the PIRAZ station with King on 10, 11, and 12 August. Returning to south SAR the next day, she remained at sea there for the remainder of August.

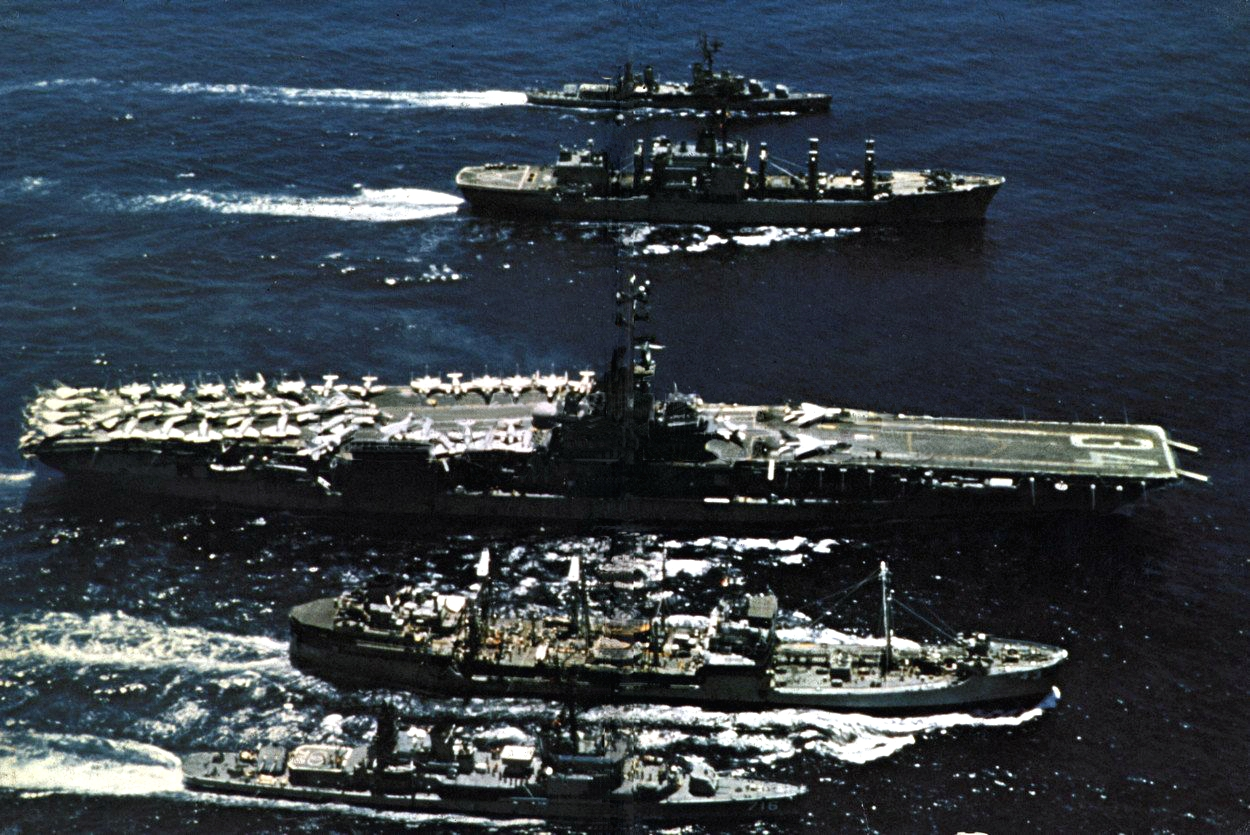
Witsie, foreground, being replenished with USS Oriskany off Vietnam in 1969

After rejoining Bonhomme Richard, Wiltsie escorted the carrier to Sasebo, Japan, from 2 to 4 September. Following a period of upkeep and recreation there, the destroyer visited Hong Kong en route to her final commitment in the Vietnam War zone. Wiltsie was deployed on Yankee Station for the remainder of September, and the destroyer then shifted to Subic Bay. There, she prepared for a gunnery exercise and proceeded to sea on 10 October for operations with USS Craig and USS Cochrane. On that day, Wiltsie participated in sinking the after section of the hull of USS Frank E. Evans, the destroyer that had been cut in two during a collision with Australian aircraft carrier HMAS Melbourne the previous 3 June.

Rendezvousing with Bonhomme Richard soon afterwards, Wiltsie and the carrier steamed to Japan, arriving at Yokosuka on 15 October. Two days later, with ComDesDiv 72 embarked, Wiltsie got underway with the remainder of her division to escort Bonhomme Richard back to the United States and arrived at San Diego at the end of a fortnight's voyage. For the remainder of 1969, the destroyer remained in her home port.

Wiltsie conducted an ASW training operation early in January 1970 and returned to San Diego on 8 January. Between that day and 15 April, Wiltsie remained in port. During this time, she suffered hull damage while moored alongside John W. Thomason. "Exceptionally high winds" buffeted the ships together when a mooring camel between the two ships overturned, opening riveted seams in Wiltsie's hull. On 13 March 1970, Wiltsie was drydocked at the San Diego Marine and Shipbuilding Co. and was under repairs there until 7 April.

=== 1970–1977 ===
After operating locally out of San Diego into the summer, Wiltsie departed her home port on 27 July 1970. Following stops at Pearl Harbor, Midway, and Guam, she arrived at Subic Bay on 18 August. There, she took on additional .50-caliber machine guns and flak jackets before getting underway on 21 August for the Gulf of Tonkin.

Relieving USS Gurke three days later as picket for USS Bainbridge on TF 77's northern SAR/PIRAZ station, Wiltsie operated on station until 9 September. During that assignment, the ship provided in-flight refueling services to ship and shore-based helicopters standing ready to rescue downed aircrews. Although the ship originally headed for Kaohsiung for upkeep, the track of Typhoon Georgia resulted in a re-routing to Subic Bay.

Departing Luzon on 18 September, Wiltsie sailed for South Vietnam to perform 22 days of gunfire support duty to assist operations of the United States 1st Air Cavalry Division; the 1st Australian Task Force; and an ARVN battalion. During the deployment on the "gun line"—her first since 1967—Wiltsie fired 3,365 rounds of 5-inch ammunition before she departed the station on 11 October and headed for Taiwan for rest and recreation at Keelung.

While there, Wiltsie was preparing to move on to Japan when urgent orders arrived on the evening of 19 October to report back to the "gun line." Typhoon Joan had damaged another destroyer severely enough to limit its ability to fight, so Wiltsie was substituted. Arriving at her station in the Gulf of Thailand on the morning of 23 October, Wiltsie supported the ARVN 21st Division with gunfire, shelling communist troop concentrations, gun positions, and supply lines for five days, expending 485 rounds of 5-inch projectiles.

Refueling and rearming from USS Ashtabula on 29 October, Wiltsie headed north, for Japan, avoiding Typhoon Kate en route. Wiltsie reduced speed to 12 knots (22 km/h) in the worsening weather conditions before putting into Buckner Bay, Okinawa, to refuel on 2 November before again setting out for Sasebo. The next morning, while underway and approaching the coast of Kyushu, a sailor was swept over the side. Wiltsie, joined by Richard B. Anderson and the Japanese Maritime Self Defense Force vessels Asagunmo, Makiguma, and Hic-kugo, conducted a day-long search for her missing sailor but came away empty-handed. A few days later, his body was discovered washed up on a nearby island.

Later departing Sasebo on 6 November, she served as screen for King as a Peacetime Aerial Reconnaissance Program (PARPRO) picket in the Sea of Japan from the 8th to the 10th, before returning to Sasebo. Shifting to Korean waters for a port visit to Pusan, South Korea, from 27 to 30 November, and replenishing at Sasebo, Wiltsie served a second tour as PARPRO picket ship for USS Halsey from 30 November to 6 December.

Subsequently, returning again to Sasebo to replenish, Wiltsie refueled at Keelung and spent Christmas at Hong Kong before shifting to the Philippines where it spent the remainder of 1970.

Early in 1971, the destroyer returned to Vietnamese coastal waters to render gunfire support for ARVN units between 4 and 18 January 1971.

Returning to Subic Bay, Wiltsie offloaded the special equipment taken on board for the "gunline" deployments—flak jackets, .50-caliber machine guns (for use against possible sappers or small boats), and "pool radio equipment" and departed the Philippines on 20 January, bound for the United States. After stopping en route at Guam, Midway and Pearl Harbor, Wiltsie arrived at San Diego on 11 February.

During the ensuing year, Wiltsie remained on the coast of southern California, for the most part at San Diego. In March and April, she served plane guard duty for Oriskany and USS Enterprise; and, in June, entered the Long Beach Naval Shipyard for an overhaul which lasted until mid-November 1971.

On 19 February 1972, the destroyer was notified that, effective 1 July, it would be assigned to the Naval Reserve Force and based at San Francisco for training duty. While in the Hunters Point Naval Shipyard preparing for its new role, however, Wiltsie received word on 22 May that—instead of beginning reserve duty in July she would head back to the Far East for its 19th deployment in the western Pacific.

On 25 July, Wiltsie sailed for the orient in company with USS Meyerkord and USS Lang and touched at Pearl Harbor, Midway and Guam before arriving at Subic Bay on 16 August.

Undergoing four days of upkeep and repairs alongside USS Jason, Wiltsie prepared for another "gun line" mission off the Vietnamese coast. The destroyer loaded the extra equipment necessary for her specialized support role. Wiltsie departed Subic Bay on 21 August.

On 23 August, Wiltsie became part of TG 75.9, operating off the Military Region I. While providing gunfire support for Operation Lam Son 72, the destroyer fired some 1,803 rounds of 5-inch shells to support the South Vietnamese 147th Marine Brigade in efforts to destroy enemy forces in their area. Typhoon Elsie, which was approaching near the DMZ, temporarily suspended Wiltsie's gunfire support operations while she avoided the tropical disturbance by moving to safer waters. Resuming operations after three days of typhoon evasion, Wiltsie returned to the "gun line" and supported ARVN operations around Quang Tri City. Ordered to proceed south on 6 September, Wiltsie departed the waters off northern South Vietnam to fire gunnery missions supporting the ARVN 2nd Division in the vicinity of Chu Lai.

Terminating her operations supporting the ARVN 2nd Division to shift to interdiction of waterborne logistics craft and surveillance of merchant ships in the Hon La anchorage in North Vietnam, Wiltsie found diversified operations and hostile fire in store for her. Her 5-inch guns wreaked havoc on storage dumps, coastal defense sites, radar installations, and supply routes. On 14 September, she spotted a crippled A-7 Corsair aircraft plunging into the Gulf of Tonkin and rescued the pilot from the water.

Two days later, she conducted a single-ship raid against a bridge on a major North Vietnamese supply route. During the action, she came under fire from North Vietnamese shore batteries that fired some 70 rounds at the destroyer. This was the only time that the ship came under hostile fire in Vietnam. The next day, Wiltsie and two other ships conducted a "reactive strike" on the coastal defense site, pounding it with 5-inch gunfire. Supply route and waterborne supply interdiction continued thereafter until Wiltsie, relieved by USS Henry W. Tucker, departed the area on 20 September.

Returning to Subic Bay for upkeep the next day, the destroyer remained in port until 27 September when it sailed for the Gulf of Thailand for gunnery support duties off the west coast of Vietnam. Between late September and early November, Wiltsie operated on station in the Gulf of Thailand. During the gunfire operations, she expended 1,940 5-inch rounds into the U Minh forest, supporting the ARVN 21st Division. Gunfire direction was provided by air spotting, but the dense foliage of the U Minh forest often prevented assessment of results.

In addition to gunfire support duties, Wiltsie was given the task of detecting and tracking waterborne supply traffic. Supported in this operation by P-3 Orion patrol planes, Wiltsie discouraged the enemy from attempting supply by sea along the western coastline of South Vietnam. Henry W. Tucker relieved Wiltsie on 2 November.

After a week of upkeep at Singapore, Wiltsie resumed gunfire support operations in Military Region I near the DMZ. She spent a week firing round-the-clock gunfire support missions before joining USS Saratoga with TU 72.0.1, as plane-guard destroyer. Between 21 November and 8 December, she escorted the Saratoga as it launched air strikes against enemy forces ashore. In the predawn hours of 28 November, an A-6 Intruder aircraft crashed upon takeoff; and Wiltsie proceeded to the scene of the accident, pinpointing the location and vectoring rescue helicopters from Saratoga to the point. One of the aircraft's crew was rescued quickly and returned to his carrier, but the other pilot, despite the combined efforts of Bainbridge and helicopters from USS America, was never found.

Wiltsie proceeded to Hong Kong for rest and recreation and to Kaohsiung for an upkeep alongside USS Bryce Canyon. During this availability, all four of her 5-inch guns were rebarreled due to the excessive wear experienced during gunfire support deployments. The ship departed Taiwan on 27 December to return to the "gun line."

Arriving on station two days later, she resumed her operations off Quang Tri City, south of the DMZ, and continued these operations until 22 January 1973, when she was detached from TG 75.9 to proceed to Yokosuka. Prom there, the ship sailed for home, arriving at its new home port, San Francisco, on 16 February.

However, Wiltsie's time on the west coast was comparatively brief for—following a yard period at Willamette Shipyard, Richmond, California she got underway again for WestPac on 16 June 1973. Arriving at Yokosuka, via Adak, Alaska, on 28 June, the destroyer shifted to Kure before conducting ASWEX 7–73 with Japanese Maritime Self Defense Force units from 9 to 12 July. Moving to Kaohsiung on 22 July, the ship participated in Exercise "Sharkhunt II" with Republic of China Navy units before spending an in-port period at Keelung from 28 July to 1 August.

Wiltsie returned home via Pearl Harbor, arriving at San Francisco on 30 August. She participated in COMPTUEX 11–73 in October and served as plane guard for Coral Sea in local operations off the California coast in December. The destroyer continued the routine of local operations out of San Francisco for the remainder of her active service, embarking Naval Reserve units for active duty training on cruises off the west coast and to Hawaii and, on occasion, serving as escort vessel for submarines on their sea trials out of Mare Island.

Wiltsie received nine battle stars for Korean War service and seven for Vietnam. As of 2025, no other ship in the United States Navy has been named Wiltsie.

Decommissioning preparations began at Alameda in November 1975, and Wiltsie was decommissioned there on 23 January 1976. Simultaneously struck from the Navy List, the veteran of Korean War and Vietnam service was transferred, via sale, to Pakistan.

== Pakistan service ==
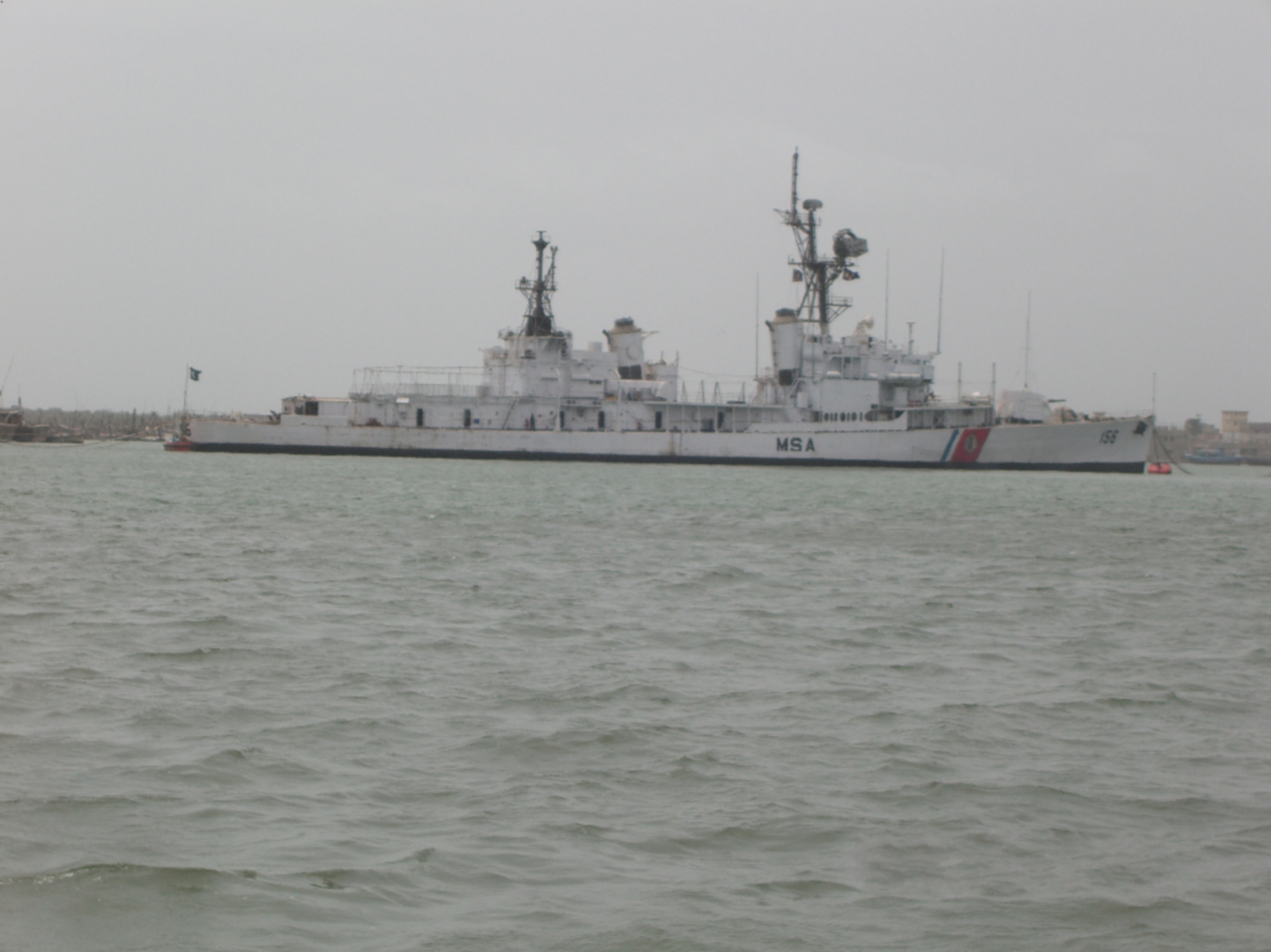
USS Wiltsie as PMSS Nazim as "on-sea headquarters" of the Pakistan Maritime Security Agency (the coast guard) in 1999. The ship is now considered non-operational and has not been moved in years.

On 29 April 1977, the United States Government announced the transfer of Wiltsie from the United States Navy to the Pakistan Navy, following an overhaul in 1977.

After the Pakistan Navy received the destroyer in mid-1978, the vessel was recommissioned in the Pakistan Navy and renamed Tariq (D165). She was renamed Nazim after the Pakistan Navy acquired a former Type 21 frigate and recommissioned it as PNS Tariq on 25 January 1990.

The Pakistan Navy later transferred the ship to its coast guard branch, the Pakistan Maritime Security Agency, which renamed the vessel PMSS Nazim.

In her present condition, she is decommissioned by the Pakistan Maritime Security Agency and used to serve as an "on sea" headquarters. The vessel is moored some kilometers away from Naval Base Karachi and is painted white.

The ship is now considered non-operational and has not been moved in years. In this capacity, she remains the flagship of the Maritime Security Agency (MSA).
