= Attack on Pearl Harbor order of battle =

This is the attack on Pearl Harbor's order of battle for both the Empire of Japan and the United States.

Officers killed in action are indicated thus: †

== Imperial Japanese Navy ==
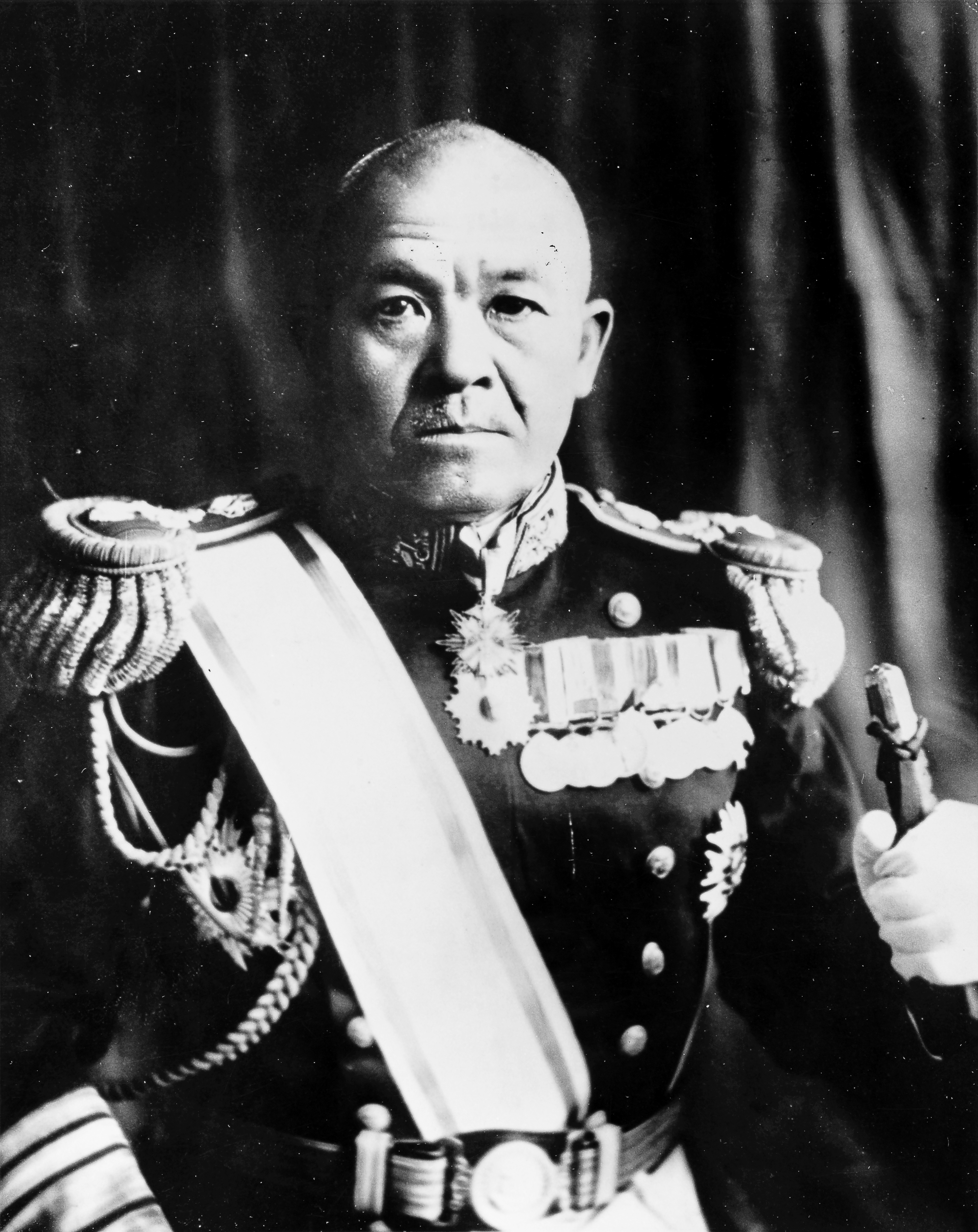
Vice Adm. Chuichi Nagumo

Naval General Staff
Admiral Osami Nagano (Note: Died of a heart attack while on trial for war crimes, 5 January 1947.)

Combined Fleet
Admiral Isoroku Yamamoto (Note: Shot down over Bougainville by US fighters while on a tour of the upper Solomon Islands, 18 April 1943.)

=== First Air Fleet ===
Vice Admiral Chuichi Nagumo (Note: Committed suicide by gunshot on Saipan, 6 July 1944.)

1st Carrier Division
Vice Admiral Nagumo

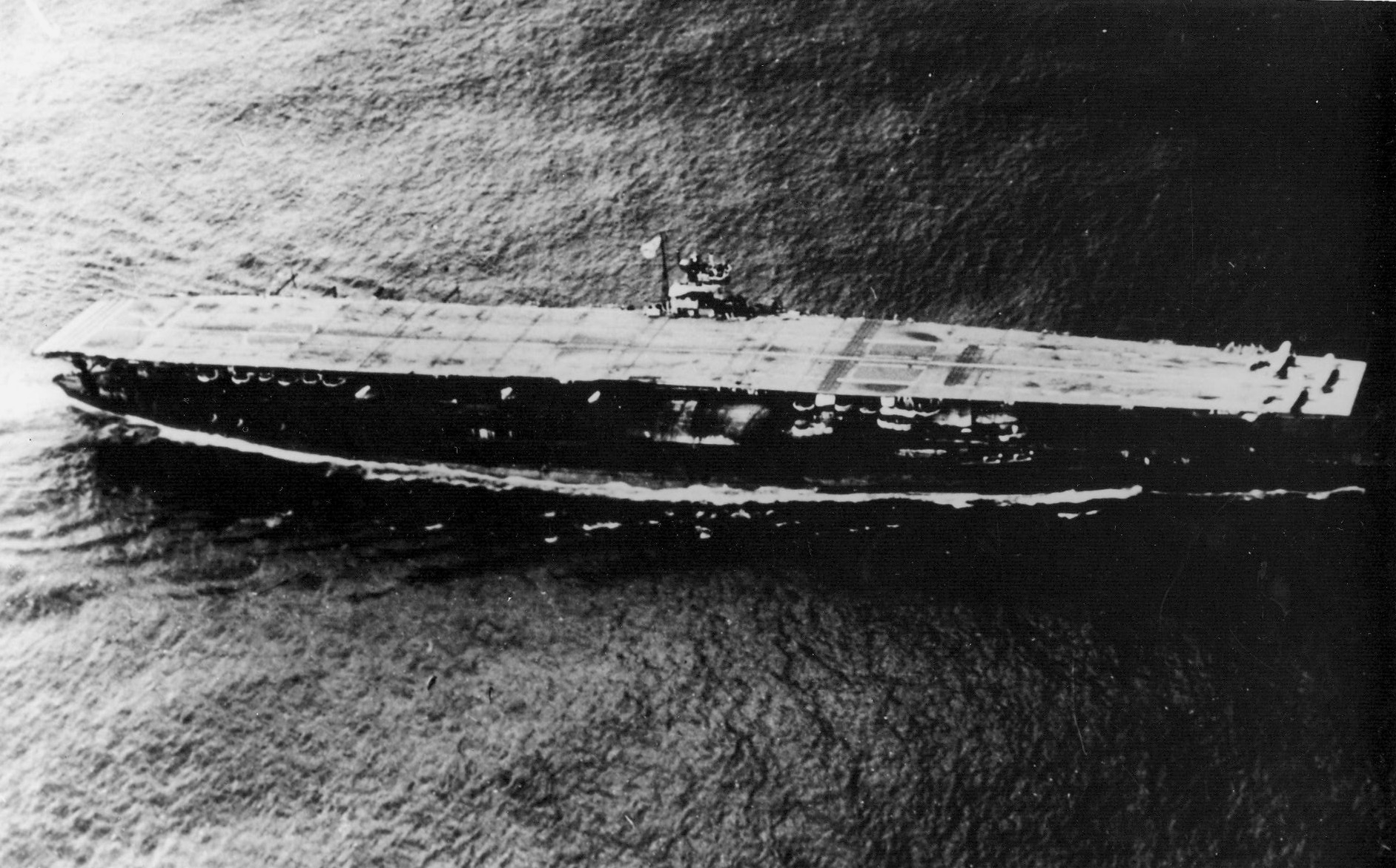
Carrier Akagi

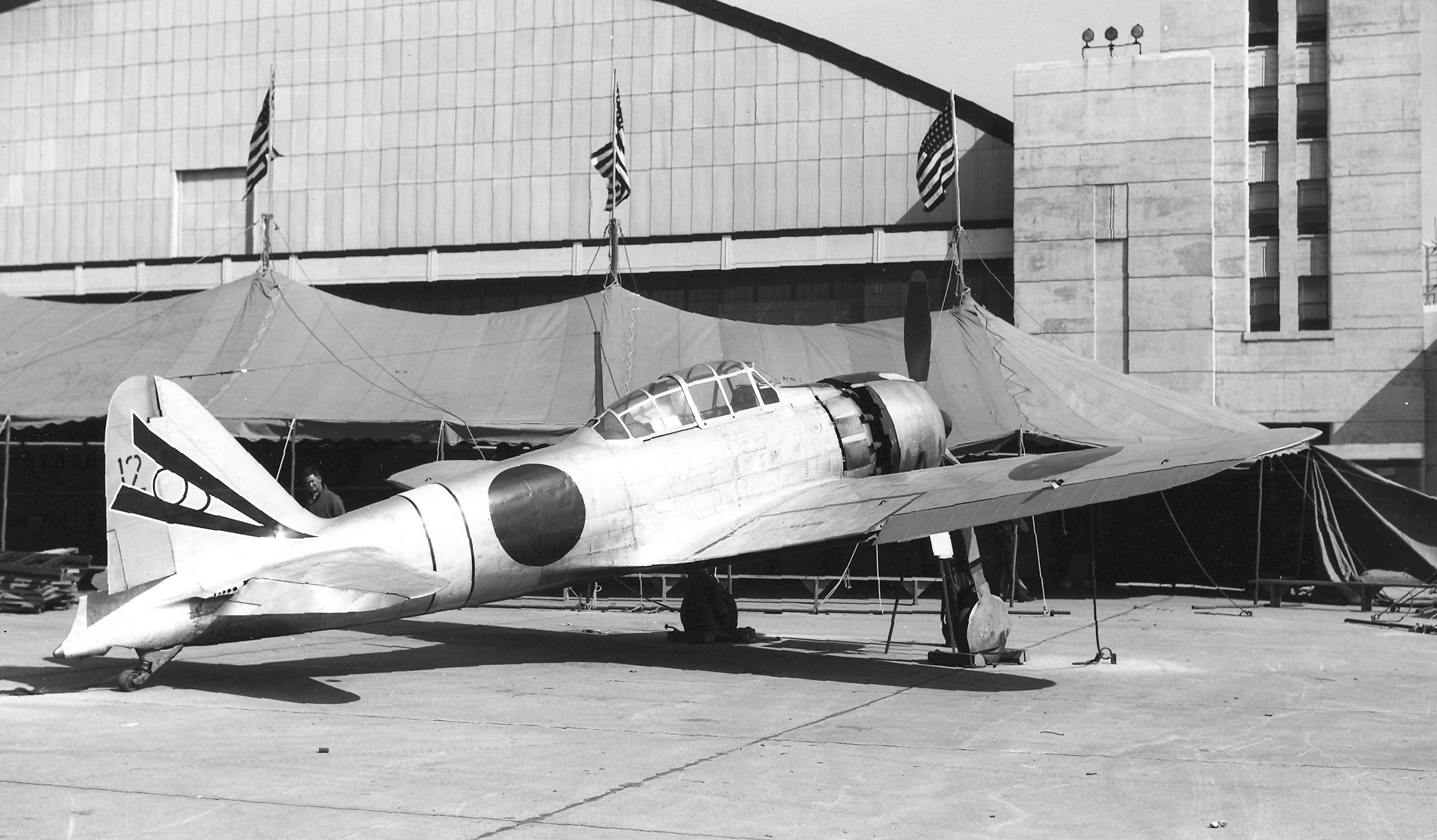
Mitsubishi A6M "Zeke" fighter

Akagi (flag) (Captain Kiichi Hasegawa)

Air Officer (Commander Shogo Masuda)

VF Leader (Lieutenant Commander Shigeru Itaya)

1st FCU Wave 1: 9 × A6M2 "Zero" (Lieutenant Commander Itaya) (one aircraft lost)
1st FCU Wave 2: 9 × A6M (Lieutenant Saburo Shindo)
CAP: (Note: Combat air patrol) 3 × A6M

VB Leader (Lieutenant Takehiko Chihaya)

21st Shotai: 3 × D3A1 "Val" (Lieutenant Chihaya)
22nd Shotai: 3 × D3A
23rd Shotai: 3 × D3A (3 aircraft lost)
25th Shotai: 3 × D3A (Lieutenant Zenji Abe) (one aircraft lost)
26th Shotai: 3 × D3A
27th Shotai: 3 × D3A

VTB Leader (Commander Mitsuo Fuchida)

1st Chutai: 5 × B5N2 "Kate" (Commander Fuchida)
2nd Chutai: 5 × B5N (Lieutenant Goro Iwasaki)
3rd Chutai: 5 × B5N (Lieutenant Izumi Furukawa)

VT Leader (Lieutenant Commander Shigeharu Murata)

1st Shotai: 3 × B5N (Lieutenant Commander Murata)
2nd Shotai: 3 × B5N
3rd Shotai: 3 × B5N (Lieutenant Asao Negishi)
4th Shotai: 3 × B5N

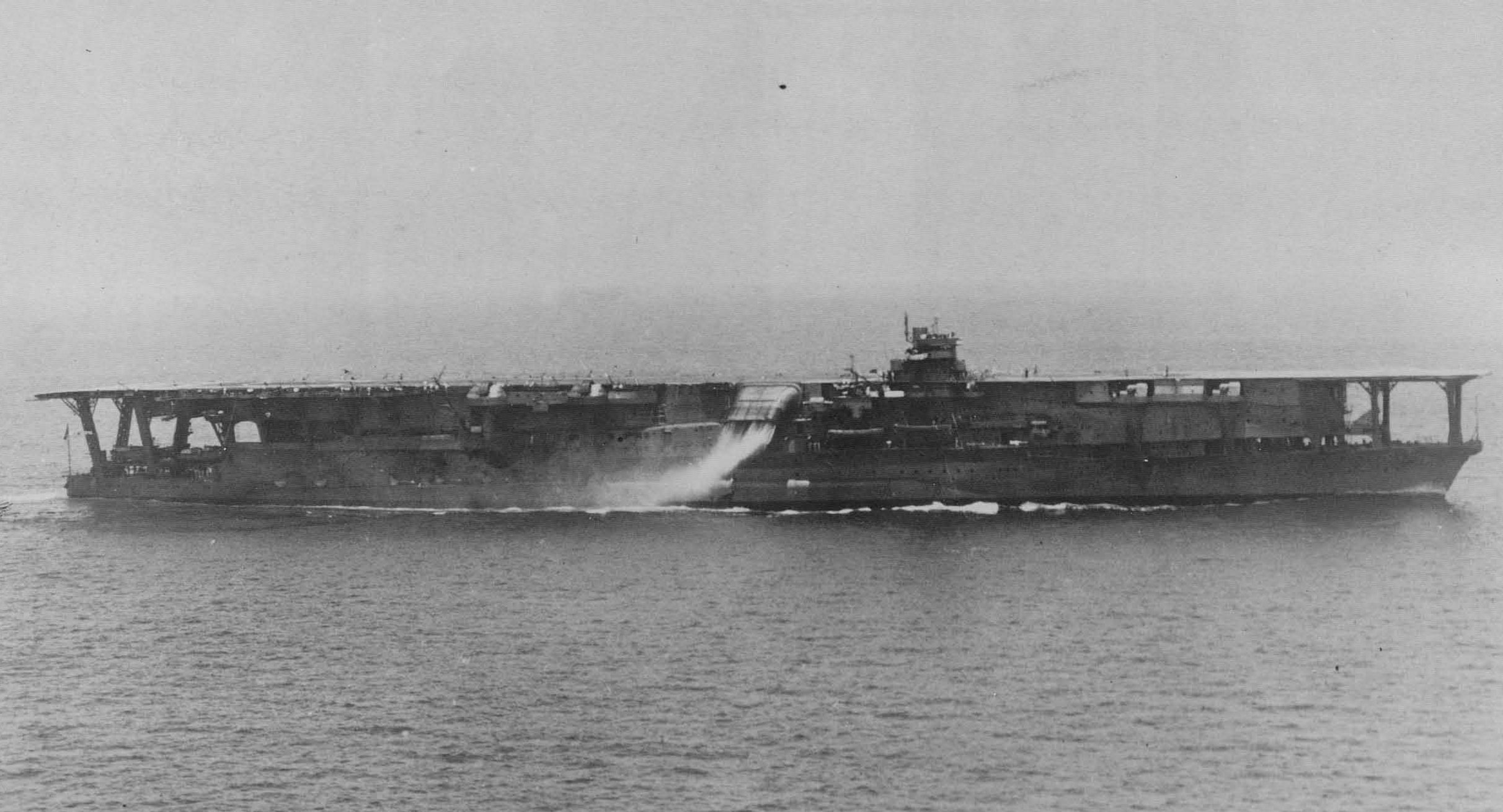
Carrier Kaga

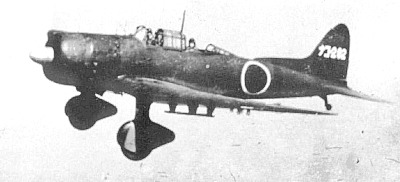
Aichi D3A "Val" dive bomber

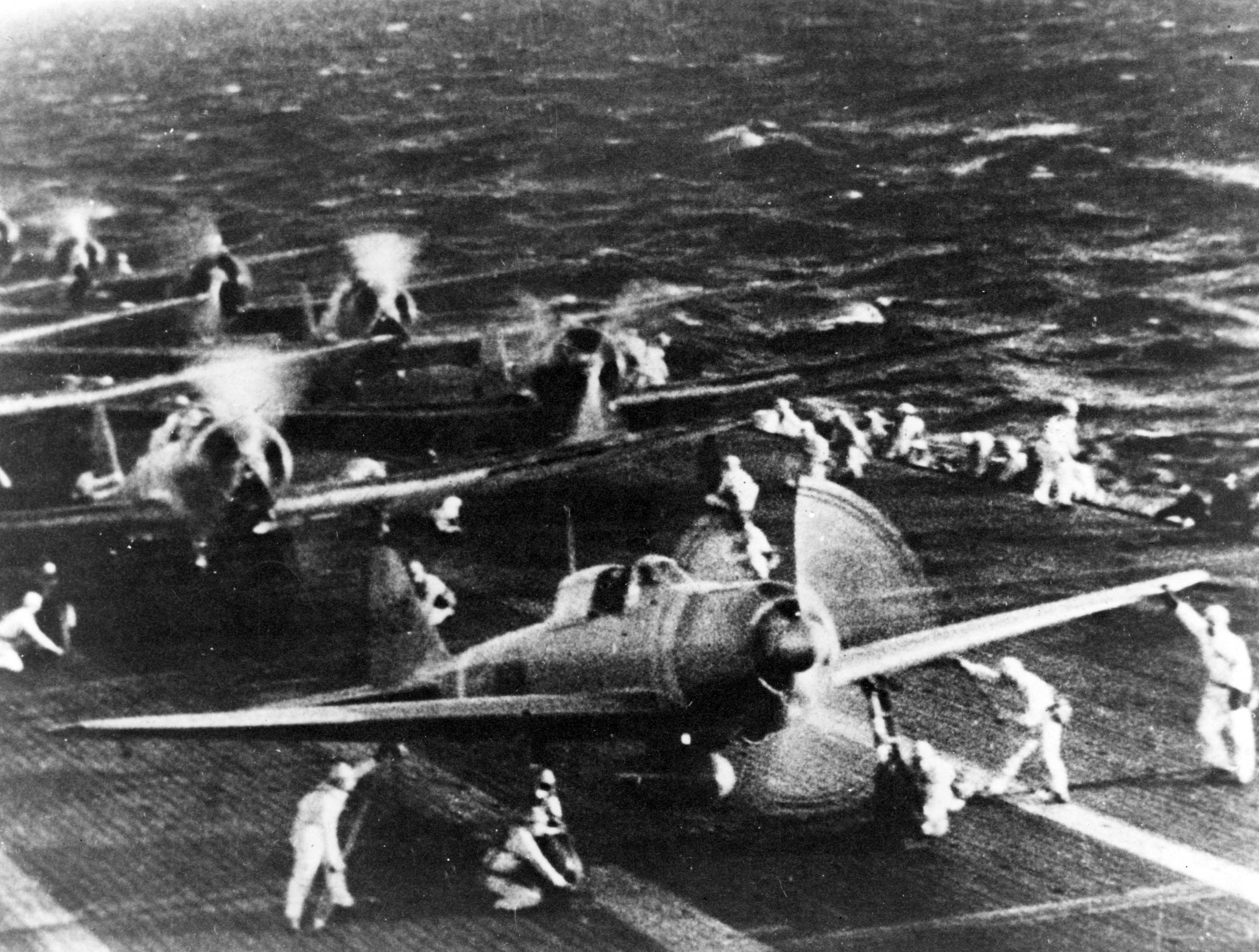
Japanese planes warming up for attack on Pearl Harbor

Kaga (Captain Jisaku Okada (Note: Killed in action at Midway, 4 June 1942.))

Air Officer (Commander Naohito Sato)

VF Leader (Lieutenant Yoshio Shiga)

2nd FCU Wave 1: 9 × A6M2 "Zero" (Lieutenant Shiga) (two aircraft lost)
2nd FCU Wave 2: 9 × A6M (Lieutenant Yasushi Nikaido) (two aircraft lost)
CAP: 3 × A6M

VB Leader (Lieutenant Saburo Makino †)

21st Shotai: 2 × D3A1 "Val" (Lieutenant Makino) (one aircraft lost)
22nd Shotai: 3 × D3A
23rd Shotai: 3 × D3A (one aircraft lost)
24th Shotai: 3 × D3A (Lieutenant Shoichi Ogawa) (two aircraft lost)
25th Shotai: 3 × D3A
26th Shotai: 3 × D3A
27th Shotai: 3 × D3A (Lieutenant Shoichi Ibuki) (one aircraft lost)
28th Shotai: 3 × D3A (one aircraft lost)
29th Shotai: 3 × D3A

VTB Leader (Lieutenant Commander Takashi Hashiguchi)

1st Chutai: 5 × B5N2 "Kate" (Lieutenant Commander Hashiguchi)
2nd Chutai: 5 × B5N (Lieutenant Hideo Maki)
3rd Chutai: 4 × B5N (Lieutenant Yoshitaka Mikami)

VT Leadern (Lieutenant Ichiro Kitajima)

1st Shotai: 3 × B5N (Lieutenant Kitajima) (one aircraft lost)
2nd Shotai: 3 × B5N (one aircraft lost)
3rd Shotai: 3 × B5N (Lieutenant Mimori Suzuki †) (two aircraft lost)
4th Shotai: 3 × B5N (one aircraft lost)

2nd Carrier Division
Rear Admiral Tamon Yamaguchi (Note: Chose to go down with the Hiryu when she was sunk at Midway, 5 June 1942.)

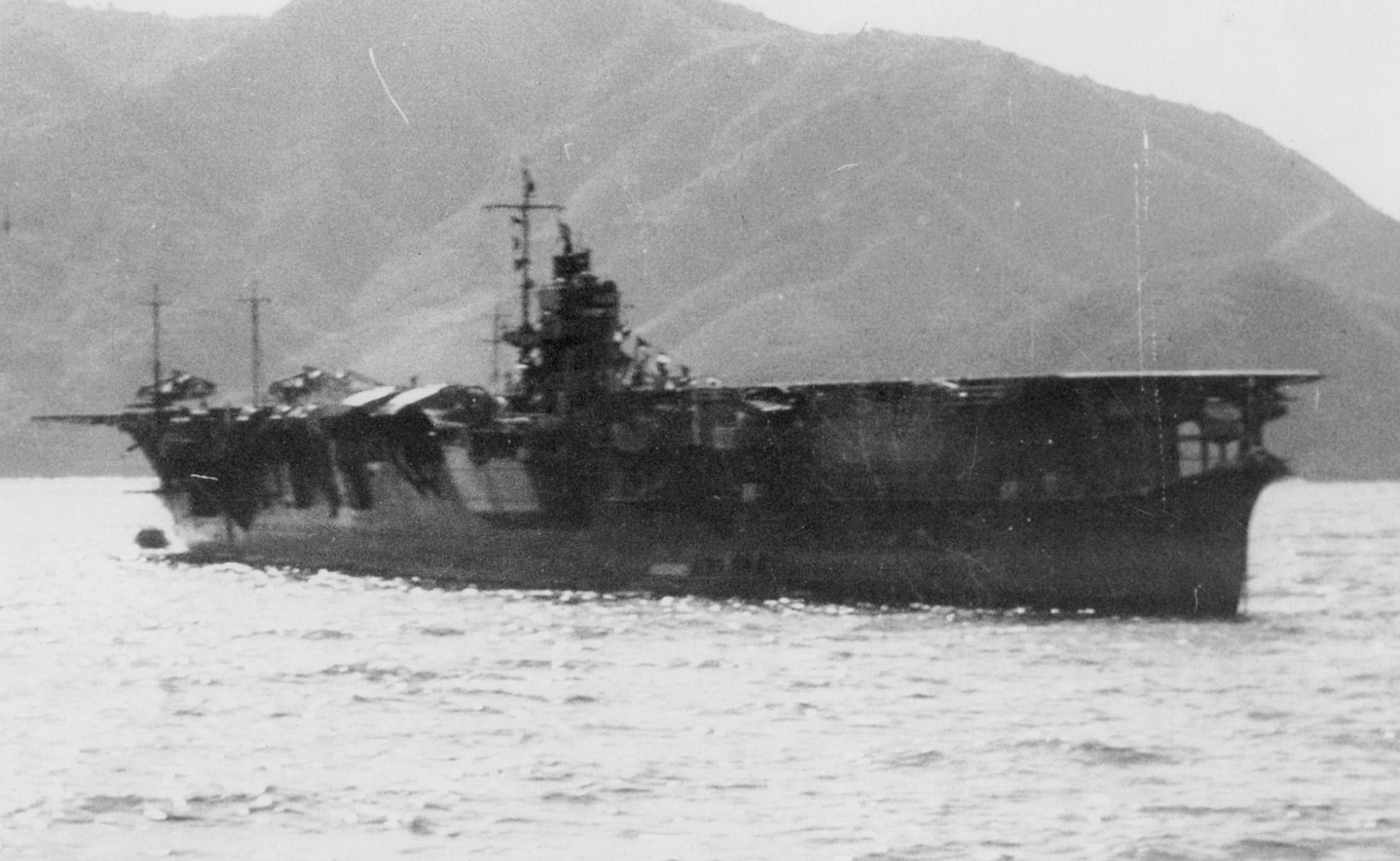
Carrier Soryu

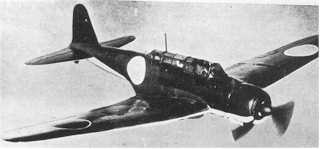
NakajimaB5N "Kate" torpedo bomber

Sōryū (Captain Ryusaku Yanagimoto (Note: Chose to go down with the Soryu when she was sunk at Midway, 5 June 1942.))

Air Officer (Commander Ikuto Kusumoto)

VF Leader (Lieutenant Masaji Suganami)

3rd FCU Wave 1: 8 × A6M2 "Zero" (Lieutenant Suganami)
3rd FCU Wave 2: 9 × A6M (Lieutenant Fusata Iida †) (three aircraft lost)
CAP: 3 × A6M

VB Leader (Lieutenant Commander Takashige Egusa)

21st Shotai: 3 × D3A1 "Val" (Lieutenant Commander Egusa) (one aircraft lost)
22nd Shotai: 3 × D3A (one aircraft lost)
23rd Shotai: 3 × D3A
24th Shotai: 3 × D3A (Lieutenant Masai Ikeda)
25th Shotai: 2 × D3A
26th Shotai: 3 × D3A

VTB Leader (Lieutenant Heijiro Abe)

1st Chutai: 5 × B5N2 "Kate" (Lieutenant Abe)
2nd Chutai: 5 × B5N (Lieutenant Sadao Yamamoto)

VT Leader (Lieutenant Tsuyoshi Nagai)

1st Shotai: 2 × B5N (Lieutenant Nagai)
2nd Shotai: 2 × B5N
3rd Shotai: 2 × B5N (Lieutenant Tatsumi Nakajima)
4th Shotai: 2 × B5N

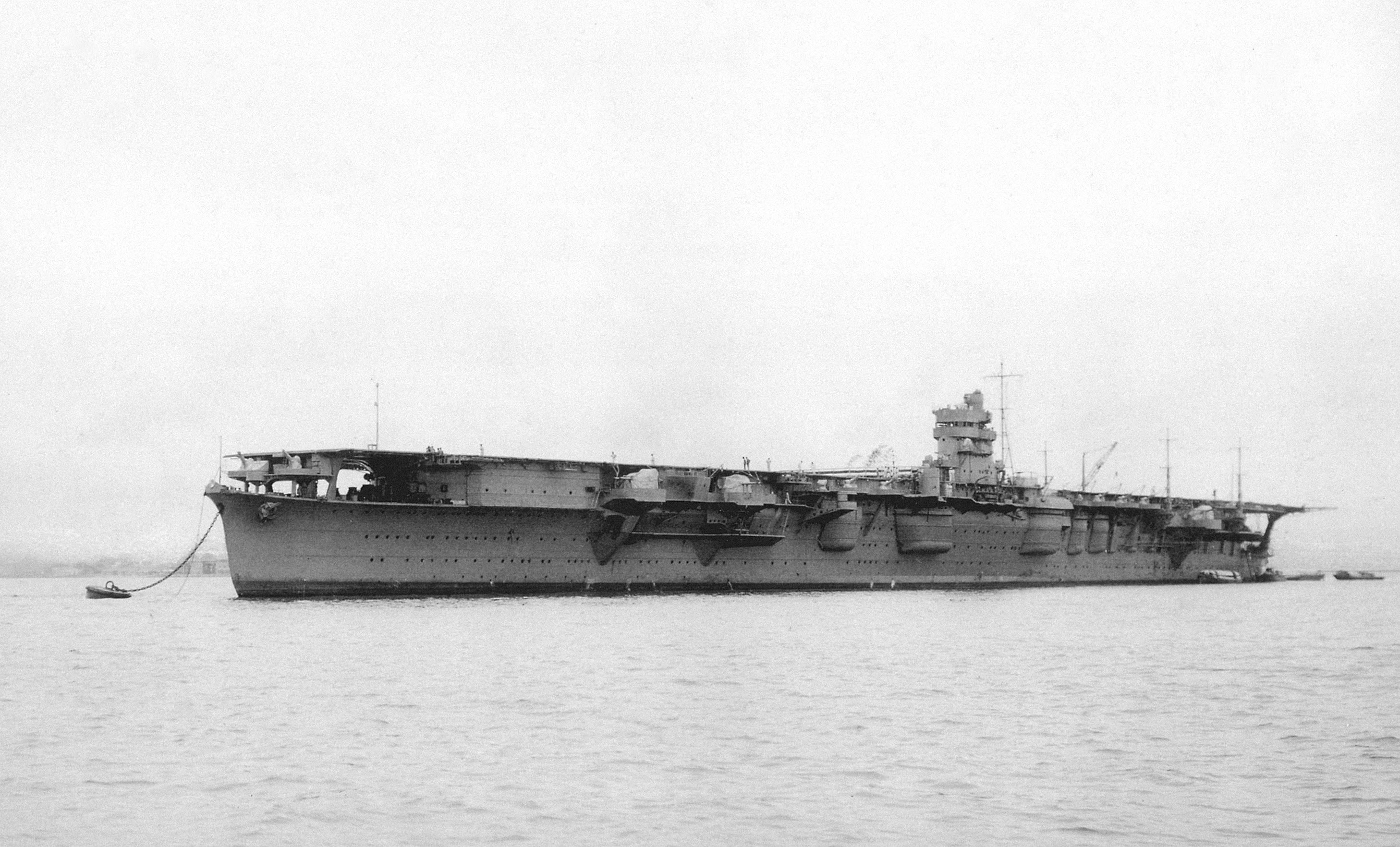
Carrier Hiryu

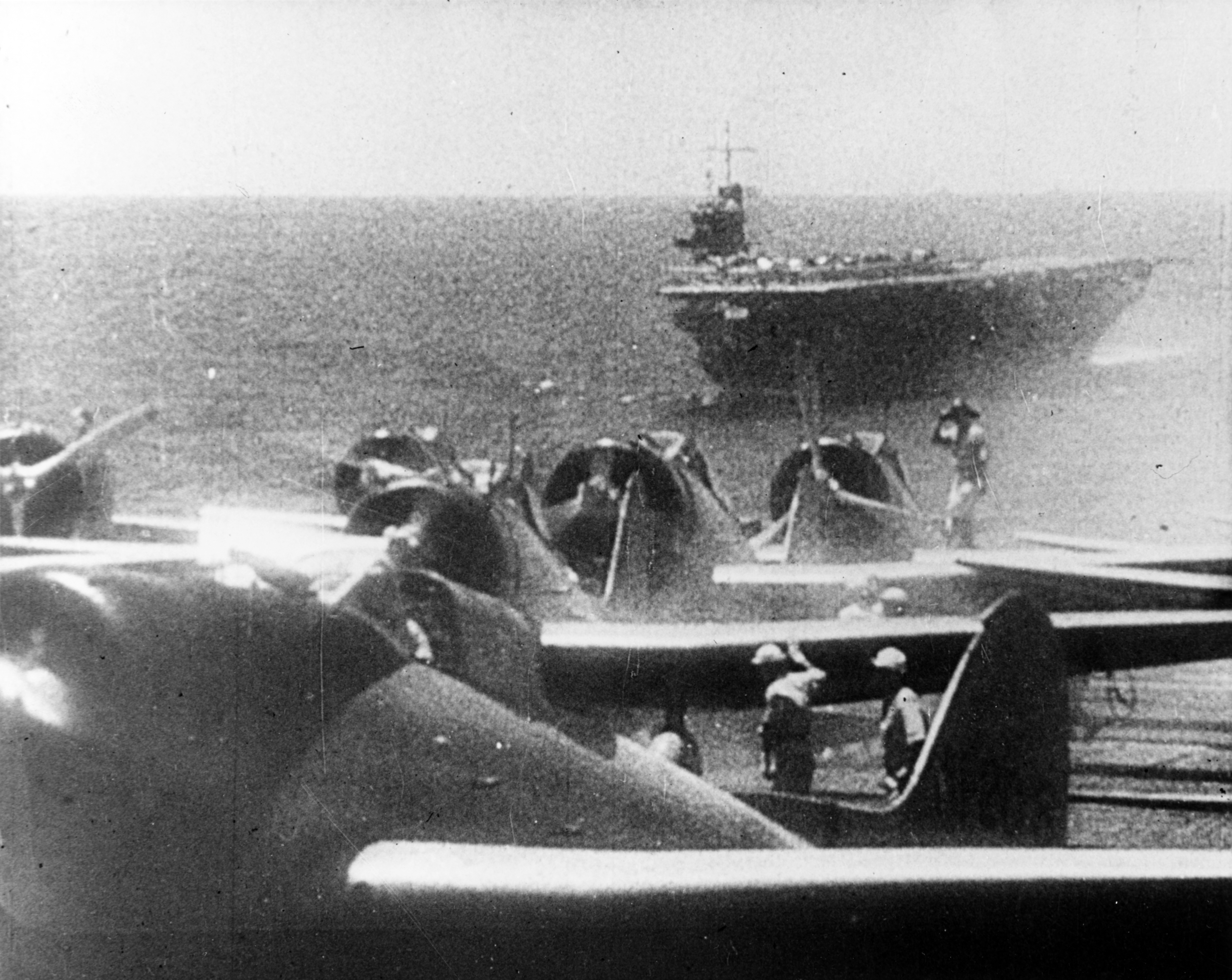
Planes preparing to take off for attack on Pearl Harbor; Soryu is in background

Hiryū (Captain Tomeo Kaku (Note: Chose to go down with the Hiryu when she was sunk at Midway, 5 June 1942.))

Air Officer (Commander Takahisa Amagai)

VF Leader (Lieutenant Sumio Nono)

4th FCU Wave 1: 6 × A6M2 "Zero" (Lieutenant Kiyokuma Okajima)
4th FCU Wave 2: 9 × A6M (Lieutenant Nono) (one aircraft lost)
CAP: 3 × A6M

VB Leader (Lieutenant Michio Kobayashi) (not present - aborted)

21st Shotai: 2 × D3A1 "Val" (Lieutenant Kobayashi)
22nd Shotai: 3 × D3A
23rd Shotai: 3 × D3A (one aircraft lost)
24th Shotai: 3 × D3A (Lieutenant Shun Nakagawa)
25th Shotai: 3 × D3A
26th Shotai: 3 × D3A (one aircraft lost)

VTB Leader (Lieutenant Commander Tadashi Kusumi)

1st Chutai: 5 × B5N2 "Kate" (Lieutenant Commander Kusumi)
2nd Chutai: 5 × B5N (Lieutenant Toshio Hashimoto)

VT Leader (Lieutenant Heita Matsumura)

1st Shotai: 2 × B5N (Lieutenant Matsumura)
2nd Shotai: 2 × B5N
3rd Shotai: 2 × B5N (Lieutenant Hiroharu Sumino)
4th Shotai: 2 × B5N

5th Carrier Division
Rear Admiral Chuichi Hara

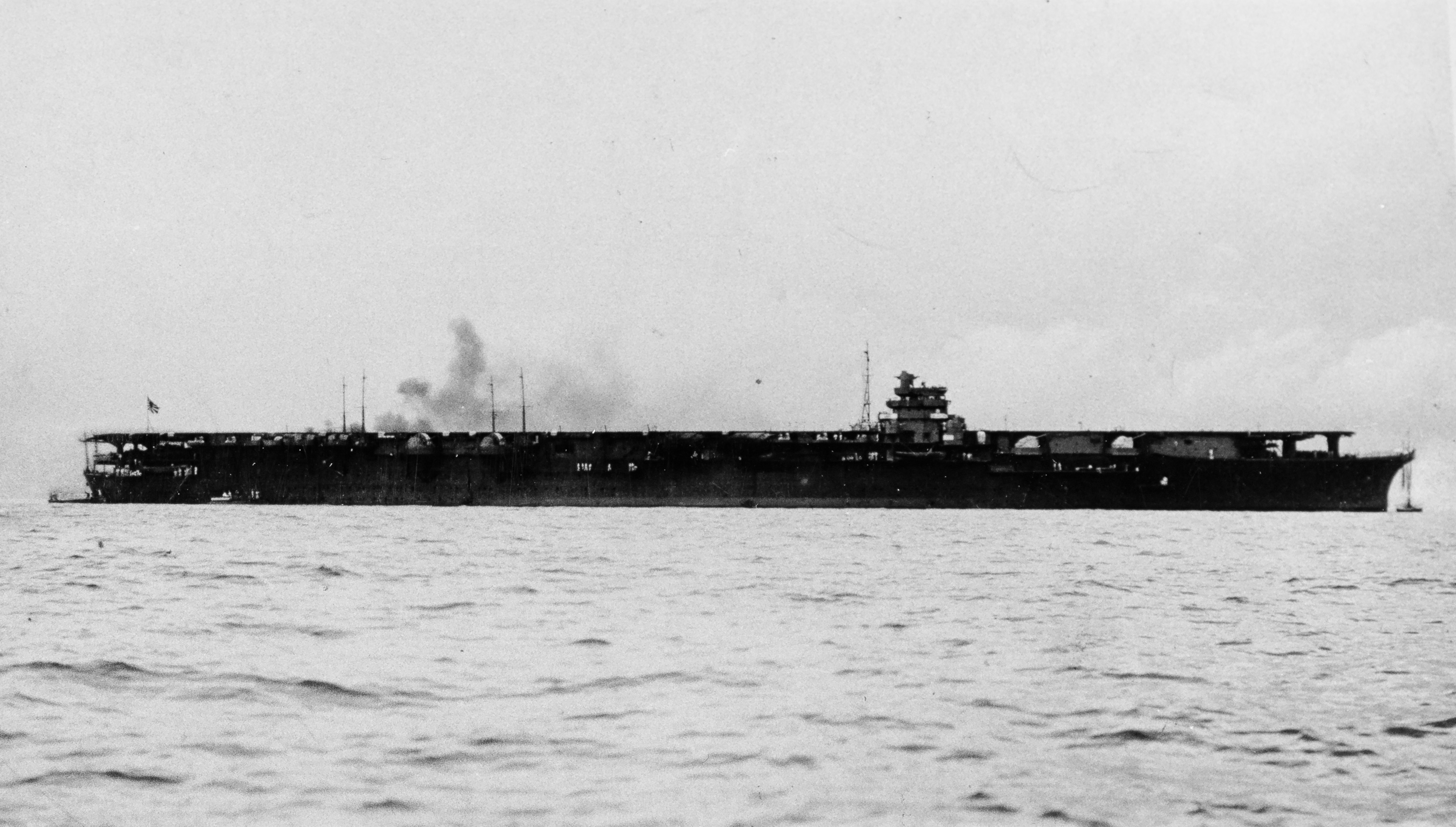
Carrier Shokaku

Shōkaku (Captain Takatsugu Jōjima)

Air Officer (Commander Tetsujiro Wada)

VF Leader (Lieutenant Tadashi Kaneko)

5th FCU Wave 1: 6 × A6M2 "Zero" (Lieutenant Kaneko)
CAP: 12 × A6M

VB Leader (Lieutenant Commander Kakuichi Takahashi)

1st Chutai: 9 × D3A1 "Val" (Lieutenant Commander Takahashi)
2nd Chutai: 8 × D3A (Lieutenant Masao Yamaguchi)
3rd Chutai: 9 × D3A (Lieutenant Hisayoshi Fujita) (one aircraft lost)

VTB Leader (Lieutenant Tatsuo Ichihara)

1st Chutai: 9 × B5N2 "Kate" (Lieutenant Ichihara)
2nd Chutai: 9 × B5N (Lieutenant Tsutomu Hagiwara)
3rd Chutai: 9 × B5N (Lieutenant Yoshiaki Ikuin)

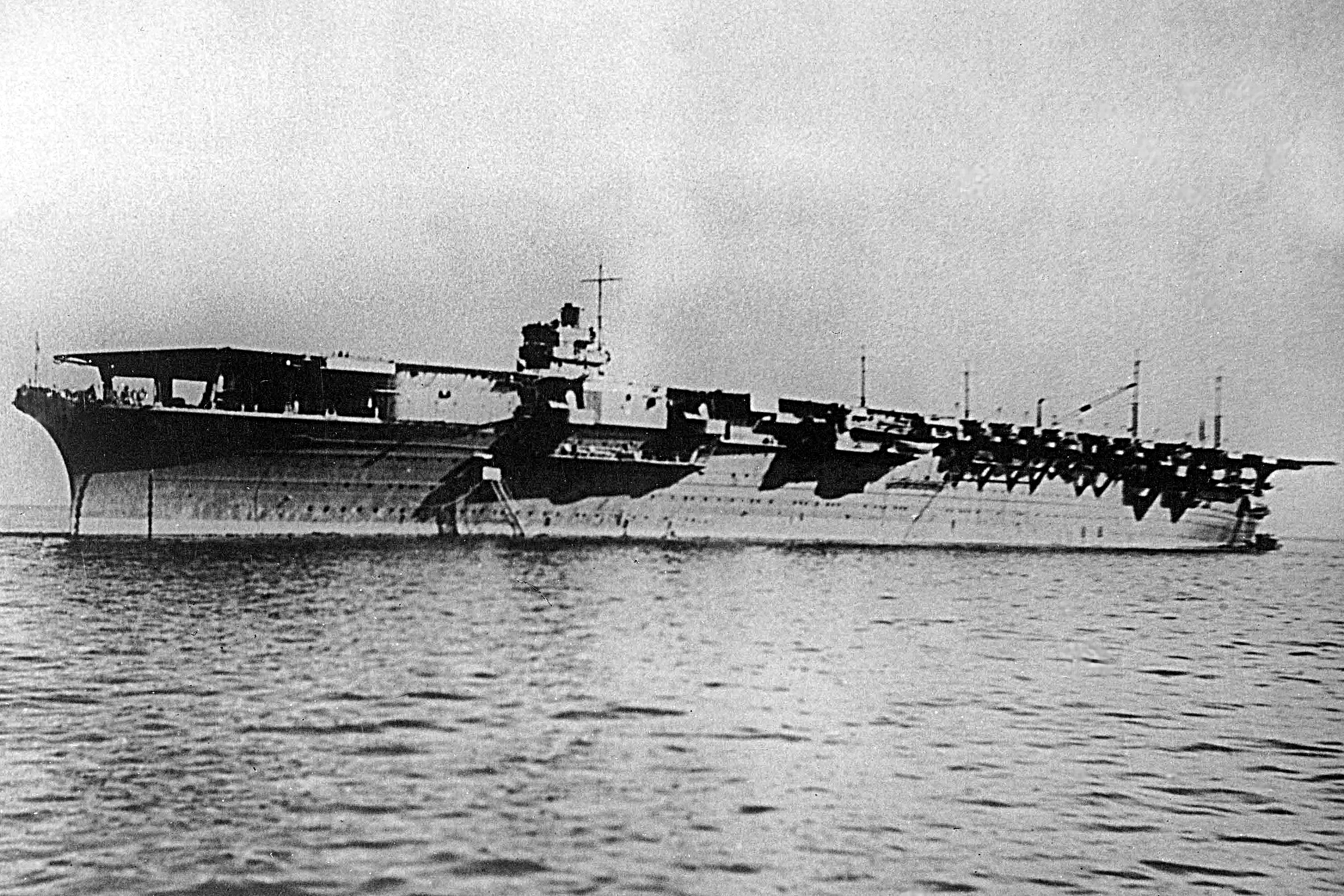
Carrier Zuikaku

Zuikaku (Captain Ichibei Yokokawa)

Air Officer (Commander Hisao Shimoda)

VF Leader (Lieutenant Masao Sato)

6th FCU Wave 1: 5 × A6M2 "Zero" (Lieutenant Sato)
CAP: 12 × A6M

VB Leader (Lieutenant Akira Sakamoto (naval aviator)|Akira Sakamoto)

1st Chutai: 9 × D3A1 "Val" (Lieutenant Sakamoto)
2nd Chutai: 8 × D3A (Lieutenant Tamotsu Ema)
3rd Chutai: 8 × D3A (Lieutenant Chikahiro Hayashi)

VTB Leader (Lieutenant Commander Shigekazu Shimazaki)

1st Chutai: 9 × B5N2 "Kate" (Lieutenant Commander Shimazaki)
2nd Chutai: 9 × B5N (Lieutenant Takemi Iwami)
3rd Chutai: 9 × B5N (Lieutenant Yoshiaki Tsubota)

1 Kagerō-class destroyer (6 × 5-in. main battery)

Akigumo

=== Escorts ===
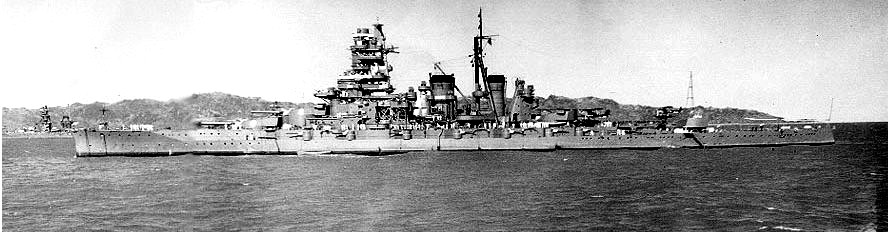
Battleship Kirishima

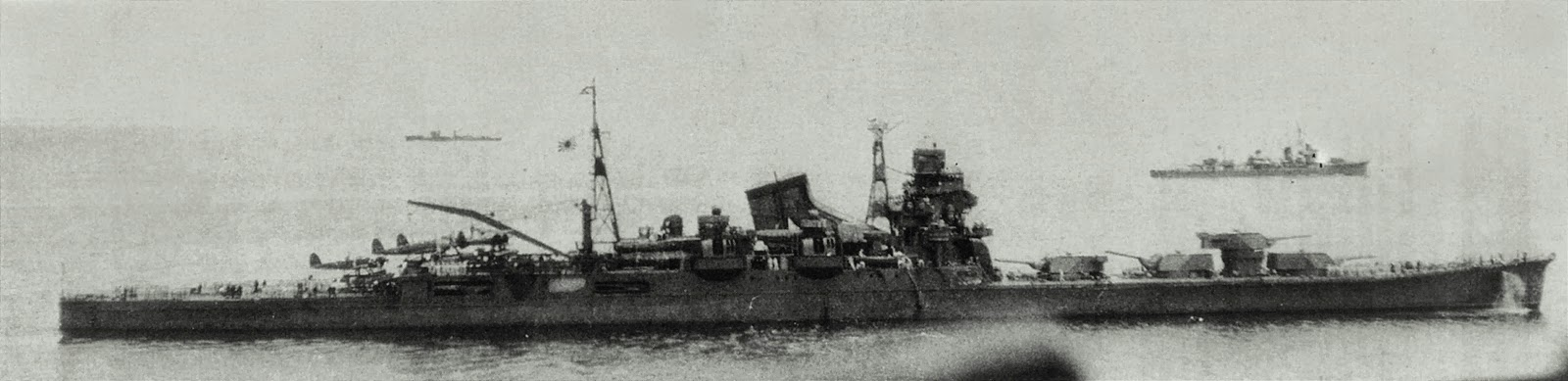
Heavy cruiser Tone

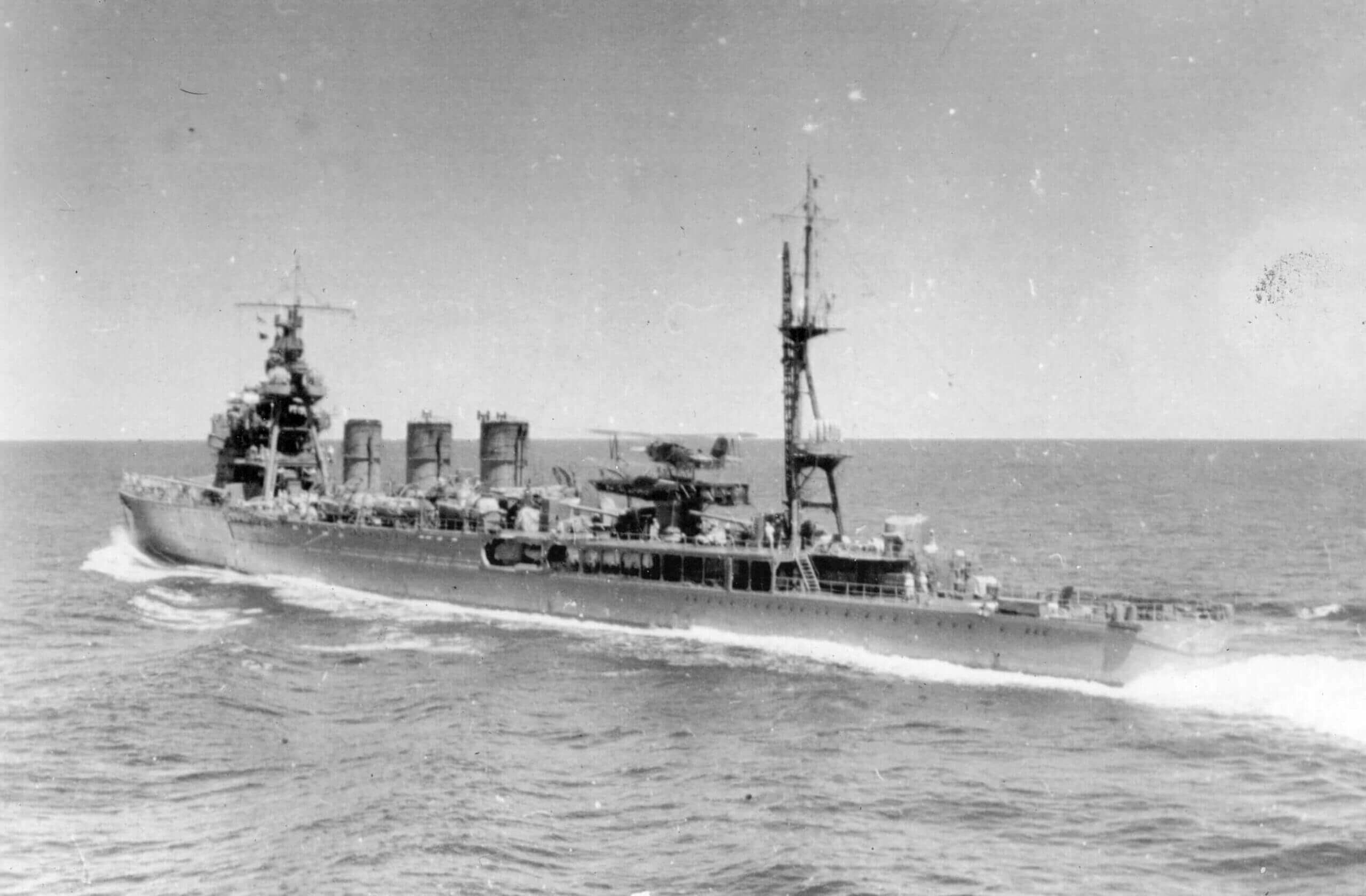
Light cruiser Abukuma

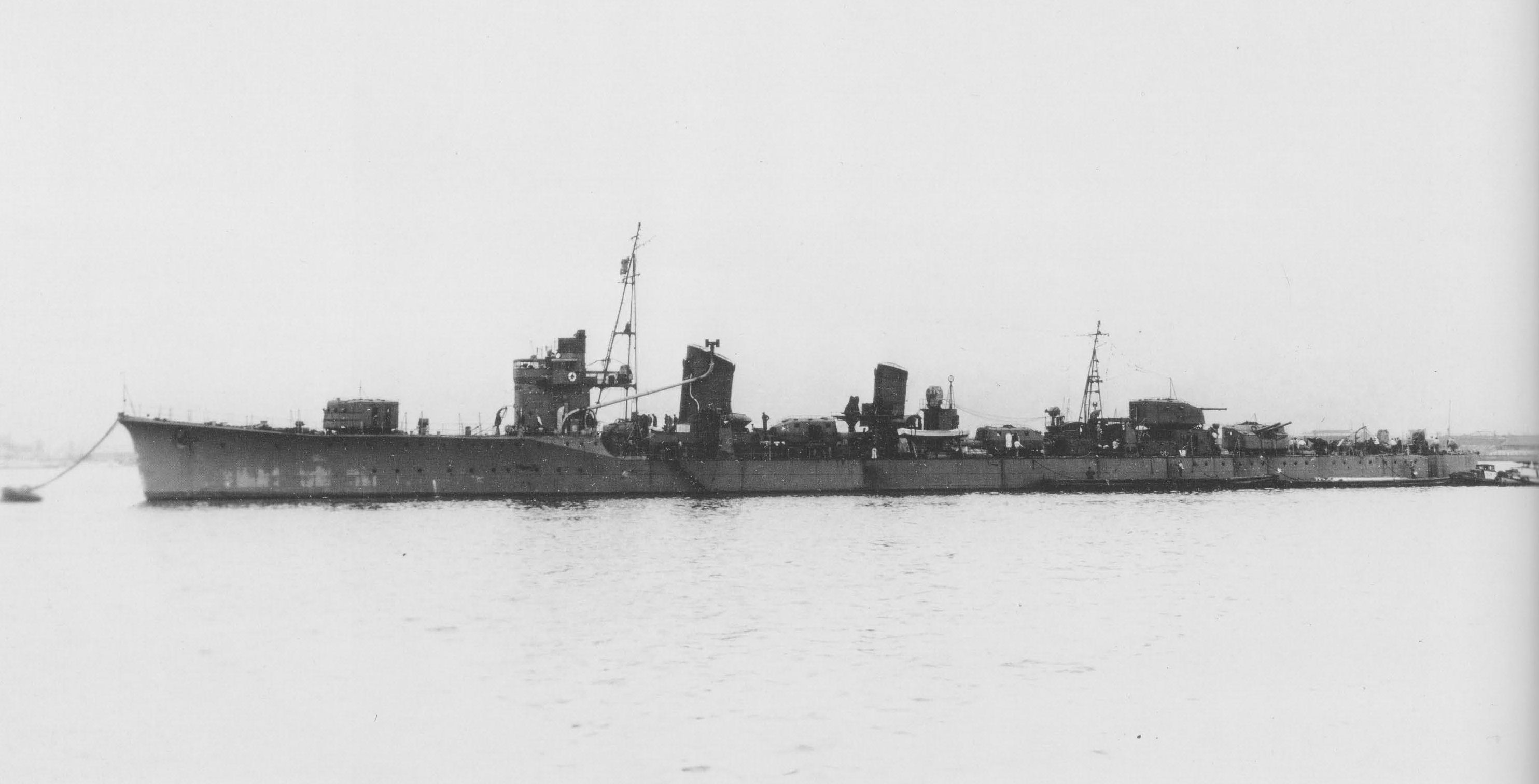
Kagerō-class destroyer Tanikaze

3rd Battleship Division
Vice Admiral Gunichi Mikawa

2 Kongo-class fast battleships (8 × 14-in. main battery)

Hiei, Kirishima

8th Cruiser Division
Rear Admiral Hiroaki Abe

2 Tone-class heavy cruisers (8 × 7.9-in. main battery)

Tone, Chikuma

1st Destroyer Squadron
Rear Admiral Sentarō Ōmori

1 Nagara-class light cruiser (7 × 5.5-in. main battery)

Abukuma

17th Destroyer Division

4 Kagerō-class destroyers (6 × 5-in. main battery)

Urakaze, Isokaze, Tanikaze, Hamakaze

18th Destroyer Division (Note: Detached from DesRon 2)

2 Kagerō-class destroyers (6 × 5-in. main battery)

Kagerō, Shiranui

2 Asashio-class destroyers (6 × 5-in. main battery)

Arare, Kasumi

7th Destroyer Division (Midway Attack Unit)
Captain Ohishi Kaname

2 Fubuki-class destroyers (6 × 5-in. main battery)

Sazanami, Ushio

2nd Submarine Division
Captain Kijiro Imaizumi

3 × I-15-class/Type B1

I-19, I-21, I-23

1st Supply Train

5 fleet oilers (all impressed merchantman)

Kyokuto Maru, Kenyo Maru, Kokuyo Maru, Shinkoku Maru, Akebono Maru

2nd Supply Train

3 fleet oilers (all impressed merchantman)

Tōhō Maru, Toei Maru, Nippon Maru

=== Submarines ===
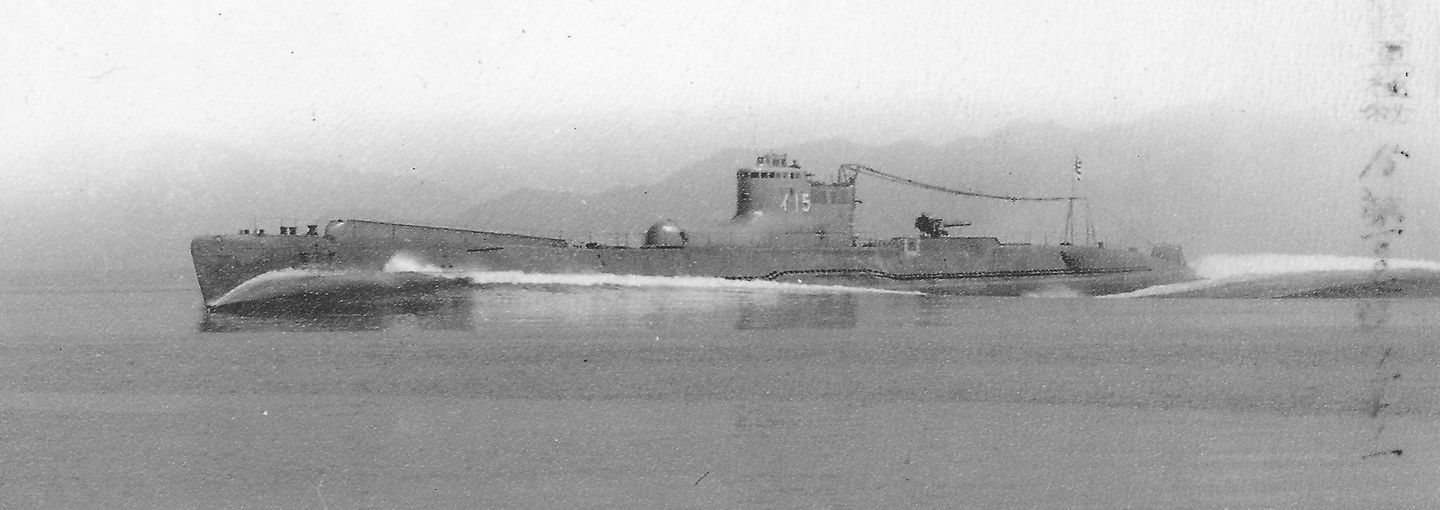
Submarine I-15

6th Fleet
Vice Admiral Mitsumi Shimizu

1st Submarine Squadron
Rear Admiral Tsutomu Sato

1 × I-9 class/Type A1: I-9
3 × I-15 class/Type B1: I-15, I-17, I-25

2nd Submarine Squadron
Rear Admiral Shigeaki Yamazaki

4 × I-1 class/Type J1: I-1, I-2, I-3, I-4
1 × I-5 class/Type J1M: I-5
1 × I-6 class/Type J2: I-7
1 × I-7 class/Type J3: I-6

3rd Submarine Squadron
Rear Admiral Shigeyoshi Miwa

1 × I-7 class/Type J3: I-8
6 × I-68 class/Type KD6A: I-68, I-69, I-70, I-71, I-72, I-73
2 × I-74 class/Type KD6B: I-74, I-75

Special Attack Unit
Captain Hankyu Sasaki ("mother" submarines commander)

Lieutenant Naoji Iwasa (midget submarines commander)
I-22 (flag) (I-16-class {Type C1})

I-22A (A type midget submarine)

I-16 (I-16-class {Type C1}) Lt. Cmdr. Hiroshi Hanabusa

I-16A (A type) (Ensign Kazuo Sakamaki (Note: USA's first POW))

I-18 (I-16-class {Type C1})

I-18A (A type)

I-20 (I-16-class {Type C1})

I-20A (A type)

I-24 (I-16-class {Type C1})

I-24A (A type)

Submarine Reconnaissance Unit
Commander Kashihara Yasuchika

1 × I-9 class/Type A1: I-10
1 × I-26 class/Type B1: I-26 (Cmdr. Minoru Yokota)

== United States ==
=== Afloat, United States Navy ===
Adm. Harold R. Stark

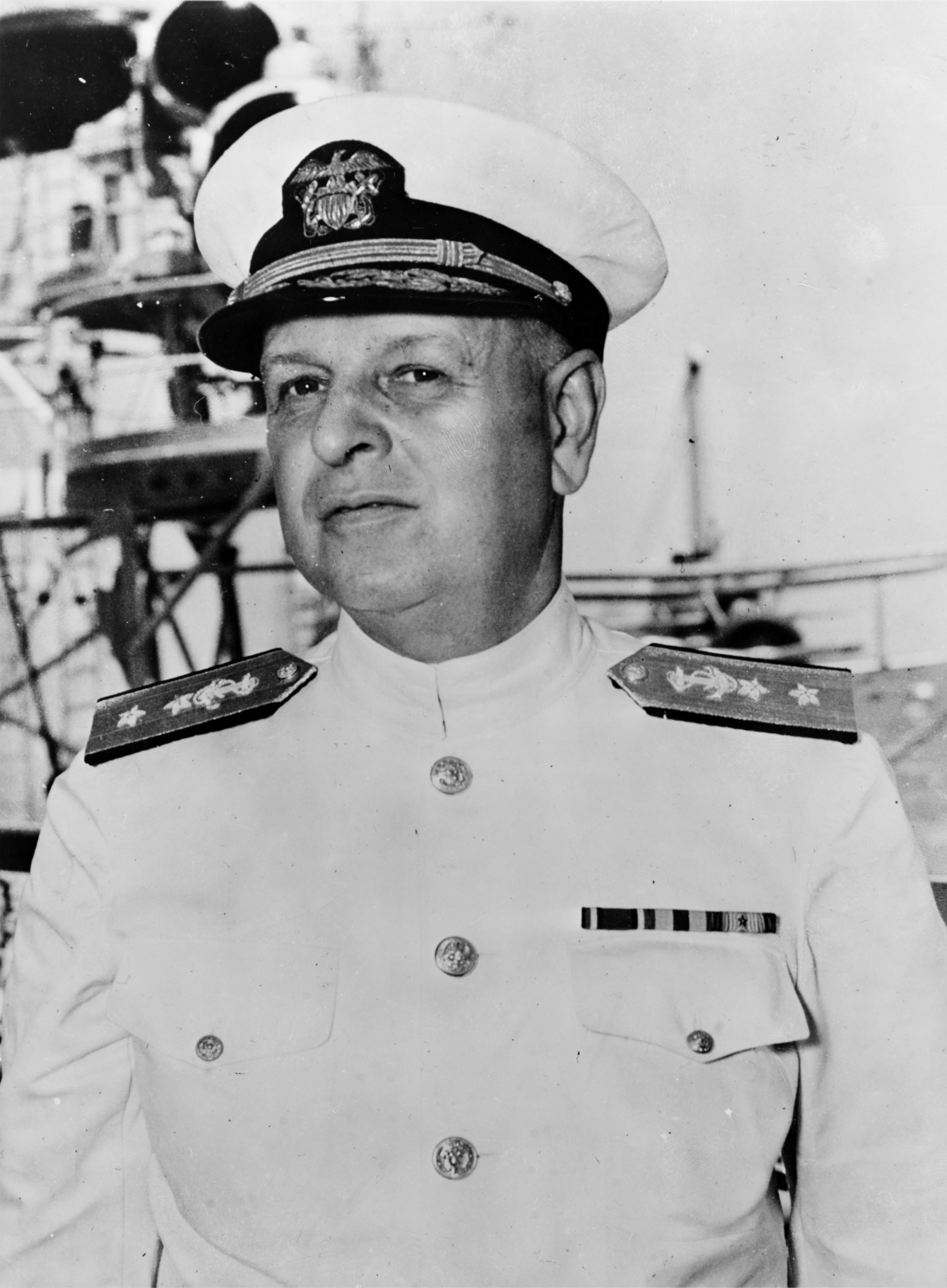
Adm. Husband E. Kimmel

Chief of Naval Operations
Admiral Harold R. Stark

Commander in Chief, U.S. Fleet / Pacific Fleet
Admiral Husband E. Kimmel

Chief of Staff: Captain William W. Smith
Operations Officer & Assistant Chief of Staff: Captain Walter S. DeLany

1st Assistant Operations Officer: Commander Roscoe F. Good
2nd Assistant Operations Officer: Lieutenant Commander Howard L. Collins

War Plans Officer: Captain Charles H. McMorris
Assistant War Plans & Marine Officer: Colonel Omar T. Pfeiffer, USMC
Security Officer: Lieutenant Allan L. Reed
Communications Officer: Commander Maurice E. Curts
Gunnery Officer: Commander Willard A. Kitts
Commandant, 14th Naval District: Rear Admiral Claude C. Bloch
Commander, Navy Pacific Fleet Air Wing: Rear Admiral Patrick N. L. Bellinger
Operations Officer: Captain Logan C. Ramsey

Battle Force (Task Force 1)
Vice Admiral William Satterlee Pye
Captain Harold C. Train, Chief of Staff

==== Battleships, Battle Force ====
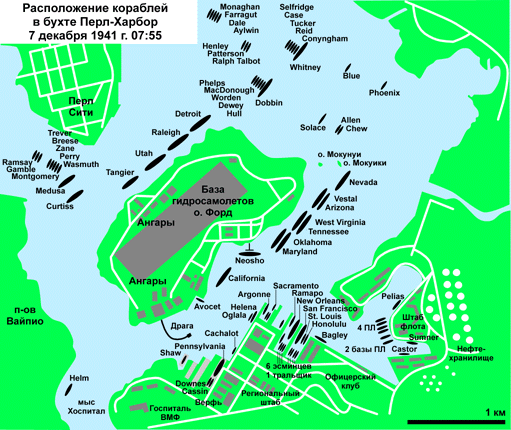
US ship dispositions at time of Pearl Harbor attack

Rear Admiral Walter S. Anderson

Battleship Division 1
Rear Admiral Isaac Campbell Kidd †

1 Pennsylvania class (12 × 14-inch main battery)

Arizona (BB-39) (sunk) (Captain Franklin Van Valkenburgh †)

2 Nevada class (10 × 14-inch main battery)

Nevada (BB-36) (Captain Francis W. Scanland)
Oklahoma (BB-37) (sunk) (Captain Howard D. "Ping" Bode (Note: Committed suicide upon learning he would be held partly responsible for the disaster at the Battle of Savo Island))

Battleship Division 2
Rear Admiral Pye

1 Pennsylvania class (12 × 14-inch main battery)

Pennsylvania (BB-38) (Captain Charles M. Cooke, Jr.)

2 Tennessee class (12 × 14-inch main battery)

Tennessee (BB-43) (Captain Charles Edwin Reordan)
California (BB-44) (sunk, raised, and repaired) (Captain Joel W. Bunkley)

Battleship Division 4
Rear Admiral Anderson

3 Colorado class (8 × 16-inch main battery)

Colorado (BB-45) (Puget Sound Navy Yard undergoing overhaul)
Maryland (BB-46) (Captain D. C. Godwin)
West Virginia (BB-48) (sunk, raised, and repaired) (Captain Mervyn Bennion †)

==== Cruisers, Battle Force ====
Rear Admiral Herbert Fairfax Leary

Cruiser Division 6 (Partial)

2 New Orleans class heavy cruisers (9 × 8-inch main battery)

New Orleans (CA-32)
San Francisco (CA-38)

Cruiser Division 9
Rear Admiral Leary

2 Brooklyn-class cruiser light cruisers (15 × 6-inch main battery)

Phoenix (CL-46)
Honolulu (CL-48)

2 St. Louis-class cruiser light cruisers (15 × 6-inch main battery)

St. Louis (CL-49) (Captain George A. Rood)
Helena (CL-50)

==== Destroyers, Battle Force ====
Rear Admiral Milo F. Draemel

Destroyer Flotilla 1

1 Omaha class light cruiser (4 × 6-inch main battery)

Raleigh (CL-7)

Destroyer Squadron 1

1 Porter class destroyer

Phelps (DD-360)

Destroyer Division One

4 Farragut class destroyers

Dewey (DD-349), Hull (DD-350), Macdonough (DD-351), Worden (DD-352)

Destroyer Division Two

4 Farragut class destroyers

Farragut (DD-348), Dale (DD-353), Monaghan (DD-354), Aylwin (DD-355)

Destroyer Squadron 3

1 Porter class destroyer

Selfridge (DD-357)

Destroyer Division Five

4 Mahan class destroyers

Reid (DD-369), Conyngham (DD-371), Cassin (DD-372), Downes (DD-375)

Destroyer Division Six

4 Mahan class destroyers

Cummings (DD-365), Case (DD-370), Shaw (DD-373) (sunk, raised, and repaired), Tucker (DD-374)

Destroyer Flotilla 2

1 Omaha class light cruiser (4 × 6-inch main battery)

Detroit (CL-8)

8 Bagley class destroyers (4 × 5-inch main battery)

Bagley (DD-386), Blue (DD-387), Helm (DD-388), Mugford (DD-389), Ralph Talbot (DD-390), Henley (DD-391), Patterson (DD-392), Jarvis (DD-393)

4 other destroyers (World War I designs)

Allen (DD-66)
Schley (DD-103)
Chew (DD-106)
Ward (DD-139) (patrolling Channel entrance to Pearl Harbor)

Task Force 8
Vice Admiral William F. Halsey Jr.

Enterprise (CV-6)

Scouting Squadron 6 (Lt. Commander H.L. Hopping)

18 × Douglas SBD Dauntless (6 aircraft lost)

Submarines

Narwhal (SS-167)
Dolphin (SS-169)
Cachalot (SS-170)
Tautog (SS-199)

==== Minecraft, Battle Force ====
Rear Admiral William R. Furlong

Oglala (CM-4) (sunk, raised, and repaired)
6 minesweepers

Turkey (AM-13), Bobolink (AM-20), Rail (AM-26), Tern (AM-31), Grebe (AM-43), Vireo (AM-52)

4 coastal minesweepers

Cockatoo (AMc-8), Crossbill (AMc-9), Condor (AMc-14), Reedbird (AMc-30)

8 fast minelayers

Gamble (DM-15), Ramsay (DM-16), Montgomery (DM-17), Breese (DM-18), Tracy (DM-19), Preble (DM-20), Sicard (DM-21), Pruitt (DM-22)

4 fast minesweepers

Zane (DMS-14), Wasmuth (DMS-15), Trever (DMS-16), Perry (DMS-17)

1 patrol gunboat

Sacramento (PG-19)

2 destroyer tenders

Dobbin (AD-3), Whitney (AD-4)

==== Auxiliaries ====
2 seaplane tenders

Curtiss (AV-4), Tangier (AV-8)

2 small seaplane tenders

Avocet (AVP-4), Swan (AVP-7)

2 seaplane tenders (converted destroyers)

Hulbert (AVD-6), Thornton (AVD-11)

1 ammunition ship

Pyro (AE-1)

2 oilers

Ramapo (AO-12), Neosho (AO-23)

3 repair ships

Medusa (AR-1), Vestal (AR-4), Rigel (AR-11)

1 submarine tender

Pelias (AS-14)

1 submarine rescue ship

Widgeon (ASR-1)

1 hospital ship

Solace (AH-5)

1 cargo ship

Vega (AK-17) (at Honolulu)

2 stores issue ships

Castor (AKS-1), Antares (AKS-3) (entering Pearl Harbor)

4 ocean tugs

Ontario (AT-13), Sunnadin (AT-28), Keosanqua (AT-38) (entering Pearl Harbor), Navajo (AT-64) (12 nautical miles or 22 kilometres outside Pearl Harbor entrance)

4 miscellaneous auxiliaries

Utah (AG-16) (target ship) (sunk), Argonne (AG-31), Sumner (AG-32), Baltimore (CM-1) (out of commission)

1 coast guard cutter

Taney (WPG-37) (at Honolulu)

=== Ashore, United States Army ===
Chief of Staff of the Army
General George Catlett Marshall, Jr.

Hawaiian Department
Lieutenant General Walter Campbell Short

Schofield Barracks

24th Infantry ("Taro") Division
Brigadier General Durward S. Wilson

19th Infantry Regiment
21st Infantry Regiment
299th Infantry Regiment, Hawaiian Territorial Guard

25th Infantry ("Tropic Lightning") Division
Major General Maxwell Murray

27th Infantry Regiment
35th Infantry Regiment
298th Infantry Regiment, Hawaiian Territorial Guard

Hawaiian Coast Artillery Command
Major General Henry T. Burgin

Hawaiian Separate Coast Artillery Brigade

15th Coast Artillery Regiment
16th Coast Artillery Regiment
41st Coast Artillery Regiment
55th Coast Artillery Regiment

53rd Coast Artillery Brigade

64th Coast Artillery Regiment
97th Coast Artillery Regiment
98th Coast Artillery Regiment
251st Coast Artillery Regiment, California Army National Guard

Hawaiian Air Force
Major General Frederick L. Martin

14th Pursuit Wing
Brigadier General Howard C. Davidson

15th Pursuit Group

45th Pursuit Squadron
46th Pursuit Squadron
47th Pursuit Squadron
72d Pursuit Squadron

18th Air Base Command
18th Pursuit Group

6th Pursuit Squadron
19th Pursuit Squadron
44th Pursuit Squadron
73rd Pursuit Squadron
78th Pursuit Squadron

18th Bombardment Wing
Brigadier General Jacob H. Rudolph

5th Bombardment Group

23rd Bombardment Squadron
31st Bombardment Squadron
72d Bombardment Squadron
4th Reconnaissance Squadron

17th Air Base Command
11th Bombardment Group

26th Bombardment Squadron
42d Bombardment Squadron
50th Reconnaissance Squadron

=== Ashore, United States Marine Corps ===
14th Naval District Marine Officer
Colonel Harry K. Pickett

Marine Barracks Pearl Harbor (Col. Gilder D. Jackson Jr.)
Observer from the Headquarters Marine Corps: Lt. Col. William J. Whaling
Marine Barracks, Naval Ammunition Depot, Oahu (Maj. Francis M. McAlister)
1st Defense Battalion (Lt. Col. Bertram A. Bone)
3rd Defense Battalion (Lt. Col. Robert H. Pepper; acting commander Maj. Harold C. Roberts)
4th Defense Battalion (Lt. Col. Harold S. Fassett)
2nd Engineer Battalion (Lt. Col. Elmer E. Hall)
Marine Corps Air Station Ewa

Marine Aircraft Group (MAG-21) (Col. Claude A. Larkin)

Marine Scout Bomber Squadron 232 (VMSB-232) (Maj. Ira L. Kimes)
Marine Utility Squadron 252 (VMJ-252) (Maj. Perry K. Smith)
Marine Fighting Squadron 211 (VMF-211)
