= USS Vireo (AM-52) =

Minesweeper of the United States Navy

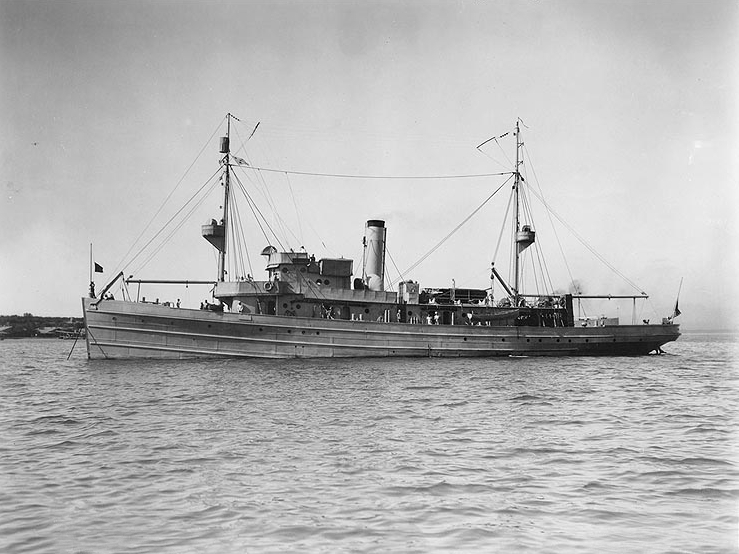

History

United States
- Ordered: as Minesweeper No. 52
- Laid down: 20 November 1918
- Launched: 26 May 1919
- Commissioned: 16 October 1919
- Decommissioned: 18 April 1946
- Stricken: 8 May 1946
- Fate: Transferred from the Maritime Commission for disposal on 4 February 1947

General characteristics
- Displacement: 840 tons
- Length: 187 ft 10 in (57.25 m)
- Beam: 35 ft 5 in (10.80 m)
- Draught: 8 ft 10 in (2.69 m)
- Propulsion: Two Babcock & Wilcox header boilers, one 1,400shp Chester Shipbuilding 200psi saturated steam vertical triple expansion reciprocating engine, one shaft.
- Speed: 15 knots
- Complement: 186 (minesweeper); 72 (tug)
- Armament: two 3 in (76 mm) guns

USS Vireo (AM-52) was a U.S. Navy Lapwing-class minesweeper, No. 52, reclassified on 1 June 1942 as a fleet tug. The bulk of her combat career was served in this capacity.

== Construction and commissioning ==
She was laid down on 20 November 1918 by the Philadelphia Navy Yard; launched on 26 May 1919; sponsored by Mrs. E. S. Robert; and commissioned on 16 October 1919.

== Post World War I operations ==
Vireo was assigned to the Train, Atlantic Fleet, and operated along the U.S. East Coast until departing Norfolk, Virginia, on 8 January 1920 to join the Fleet for its annual winter maneuvers in Cuban waters. She arrived back in Norfolk on 28 April and was reclassified AM-52 on 17 July 1920.

== East Coast service ==
In the following years, while some of her sisterships were decommissioned and laid up in reserve, Vireo continued in active service with the Fleet. From 1920 to 1932, she served off the U.S. East Coast engaged in towing targets; transporting men, mail, and materiel; repairing buoys and beacons; and operating with the Atlantic and Scouting Fleets.

In July 1921, she towed several former German warships to sea off the Virginia Capes, where they were sunk by aircraft in attempts to prove that capital ships were vulnerable to attack from the air. Between December 1930 and March 1931, Vireo served as plane guard for aircraft engaged in supporting the Nicaraguan-Puerto Rican aerial survey.

== Transferred to the Pacific Fleet ==
Late in 1931, Vireo received orders assigning her to the U.S. Pacific Fleet and duty with the Train, Base Force. Departing Norfolk on 2 January 1932, Vireo steamed—via Guantanamo Bay, Cuba, and the Panama Canal—to the U.S. West Coast, arriving at San Pedro, California, on 6 March. Attached to the Pacific Fleet's Train, the minesweeper continued her Fleet support duties and ranged the Pacific from the California coast to Panama and the Hawaiian Islands.

With the emergence of an intransigent Japan and a tense Far Eastern situation, the focus of American Fleet operations shifted westward to Hawaii; and Vireo departed San Francisco, California, on 10 November 1940, bound for Pearl Harbor. Soon after reaching Hawaiian waters, she commenced operations out of Pearl Harbor, towing target rafts, conducting minesweeping exercises, and performing towing service to some of the outlying islands of the Hawaiian group, including Palmyra Island and Johnston Island.

From 5 September to 7 October 1941, Vireo underwent a navy yard overhaul at the Mare Island Navy Yard before heading westward once again. On 7 December 1941, Vireo lay in a nest of her sisterships at the coal docks at Pearl Harbor, which included USS Rail (AM-26), USS Bobolink (AM-20), and USS Turkey (AM-13). Shortly before 0800 that morning, Japanese aircraft roared overhead. The marauders swept over the Fleet's base and devastated not only Pearl Harbor, but outlying Army and Navy installations all over the island of Oahu.

In upkeep status, with her engines dismantled, Vireo nevertheless speedily entered the fight. While her gunners topside fought their mounts coolly and efficiently, the "black gang" below decks assembled the ship's engines and fired up the boilers to get underway. Her 3-inch guns expended some 22 rounds, and the men at her number 2 mount rejoiced when one of their shells exploded directly in the path of a Japanese bomber, causing the Japanese plane to crash in a ball of fire.

Vireo and some of her sister sweepers at Pearl Harbor received orders to assist the stricken USS California (BB-44), sinking into the oil-stained ooze at berth F-3, off Ford Island.

While engaged in salvage operations alongside California, through January 1942, Vireo also served briefly as a tender to USS Enterprise (CV-6). The minesweeper carried ammunition to replenish "Big E's" depleted magazines and prepare that ship for future forays against the Japanese empire.

=== Hawaiian area operations ===
After conducting minesweeping operations in the Pearl Harbor channel and other Hawaiian waters, Vireo underwent upkeep at Pearl Harbor between 10 and 13 February 1942. Following local operations near Honolulu and Pearl Harbor, she made brief runs to Johnston Island and the port of Hilo.

In April and May 1942, after another brief stretch around Pearl Harbor, Vireo conducted local patrols out of Hilo, sometimes in company with USS Crossbill (AMc-9) to conduct magnetic, acoustic, and mechanical minesweeping operations; and to patrol harbors with her echo-ranging and listening gear. From 23 to 24 April, Vireo, in company with Crossbill and USS Sacramento (PG-19), conducted a search for survivors of a downed Army plane off Pepeekeo Point, near Hilo, and found one body before she abandoned the task.

== Service as Fleet Tug ==
On 28 May 1942, under secret orders, Vireo and gasoline tanker USS Kaloli (AOG-13) departed Honolulu and headed for Midway Island. During the voyage, Vireo was reclassified as an ocean-going tug and redesignated AT-144 on 1 June 1942. While Vireo and her charge crept toward Midway at nine knots, two battle fleets steamed toward each other on a collision course. The American and Japanese Navies were squaring off for the decisive Battle of Midway.

Vireo and Kaloli hove to in Midway harbor on 3 June, amidst preparations there for defense of the island. Soon after the two American ships arrived, they received orders to proceed to a point 30 miles off Pearl and Hermes Reef, where they were to await further orders. Underway by 1910, Vireo and the gasoline tanker soon arrived at their assigned stations and lay to.

=== The Battle of Midway ===
Air action the following day, 4 June 1942, was intense. Japanese carriers Akagi, Kaga, Soryu, and Hiryu were all crippled and sunk by American planes. However, American carrier USS Yorktown (CV-5) became the unfortunate victim of Japanese dive and torpedo bombers which heavily damaged the carrier, stopping her dead in the water, and forcing a severe list.

=== Vireo takes Yorktown in tow ===
Lest the ship capsize before the crew could be removed, Capt. Elliott Buckmaster ordered Yorktown abandoned. When Yorktown stopped settling, Buckmaster concluded that the ship could possibly be saved. Accordingly, Vireo received a summons to take Yorktown in tow. The tug arrived on the scene by 1135 on 5 June and closed and maneuvered to pass Yorktown a towline, accomplishing this by 1308. Vireo and her unwieldy charge then labored painfully ahead, at a speed of under 3 knots, with a protective brood of destroyers standing by.

Vireo, hampered by a small rudder and inadequate engines for such a large tow, found herself confronted with the Herculean task of keeping the big carrier pointed into the wind and on course. The next day, USS Hammann (DD-412) secured alongside Yorktown to assist the salvage parties on the larger ship working to correct her trim and to repair her battle damage.

Around 1400 on 6 June, Japanese submarine I-168 fired torpedoes at the nearly helpless targets. Hammann, mortally hit, broke in two and sank alongside the towering carrier, which also took two torpedoes. As the destroyer sank, her depth charges all went off at once, causing tremendous shock waves which convulsed swimmers in the water and violently wrenched the old tug. Vireo freed herself from the carrier by cutting the towing cable with an acetylene torch and then doubled back to commence rescue operations.

Up her sides clambered carriermen and destroyermen alike, while she maneuvered near the carrier's canting stern to take on board members of the salvage party who had chosen to abandon the carrier from there. She then proceeded to secure alongside the wounded flattop in the exact spot where Hammann had met her doom. Yorktown rolled heavily, her heavy steel hide pounding the lighter former minecraft's hull with a vengeance as the ships touched time and time again during the rescue operations. This mission completed, battered Vireo stood away from the sinking carrier, which sank shortly after dawn on the 7th.

Vireo's troubles, however, had only begun. Underwater explosions from Hammann's depth charges had severely jostled the tug's rudder. As a result, it jammed as Vireo was entering the shipping channel at Midway harbor on 8 June, and she ran aground on a coral head, carrying away her echo-ranging gear and flooding her sound room. Repeated attempts to free herself only resulted in another grounding, so Vireo lay-to and called for a tow.

After arriving at Midway Island at the end of a towline from YMT-12, following another brush with a coral head which irreparably damaged the rudder, Vireo soon got underway for Pearl Harbor, this time behind USS Seminole (AT-65). Reaching Hawaiian waters on 17 June, she entered the navy yard at Pearl Harbor for emergency repairs which lasted from 18 to 30 June. Following this, she remained at the Pearl Harbor yard for a complete overhaul and drydocking.

=== Converted into a tow ship and sent to Fiji ===
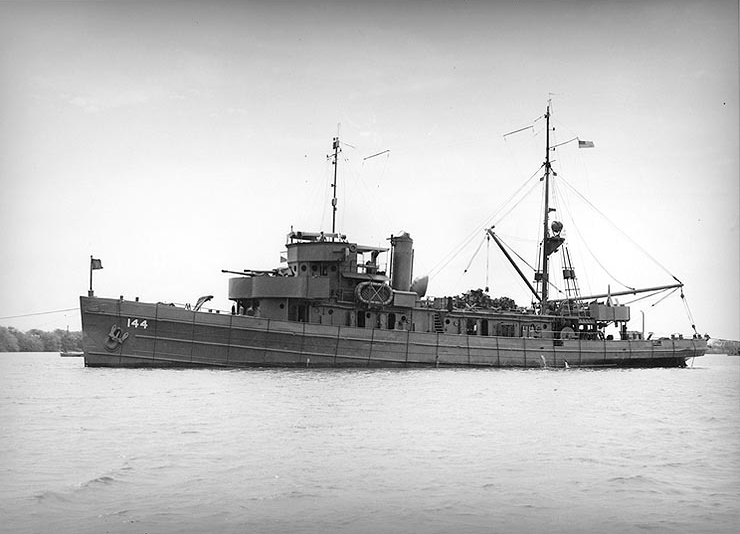
Vireo (AT-144) at Pearl Harbor, 20 August 1942.

Having concluded the refitting by 19 August, Vireo conducted post-repair trials before turning in all her mine gear on 25 August. Two days later, she got underway to escort SS Gulf Queen to the Fiji Islands, towing two barges. Upon her arrival at Suva on 11 September, the tug refueled, provisioned, and carried out minor repairs before heading for New Caledonia on 15 September. After arriving at Noumea five days later, on 20 September 1942, she commenced harbor operations under the control of Commander, Amphibious Forces, South Pacific (AmphibForSoPac). In accordance with verbal orders from ComAmphibForSoPac, Vireo's crew set about making camouflage nets and painting the ship green in preparation for her next assignment.

=== Guadalcanal operations ===
Arriving at Espiritu Santo on 8 October, she awaited further orders, spending four days at this port in the New Hebrides before setting out for the Guadalcanal area on 12 October, to take part in resupply operations for the U.S. Marines at Henderson Field.

Since the initial landings on Guadalcanal on 7 August 1942, the campaign had been fought tooth and nail. Fierce land and sea battles had characterized the fighting since the early going. By this juncture, American aviation operations on Henderson Field had been so endangered by shellings, bad weather, and inadequate supplies, that the American situation was extreme.

With American aircraft using up gasoline at an alarming rate, that commodity ranked high on the list of priority supplies. Accordingly, a barge-towing operation was mounted in mid-October to ease the critical fuel situation on Guadalcanal.

The force to carry out this operation comprised USS Alchiba (AK-23), USS Bellatrix (AK-20), USS Jamestown (PG-55), USS Meredith (DD-434), USS Nicholas (DD-449), and Vireo, each pulling a barge carrying barrels of gasoline and quarter-ton bombs. Setting out from Espiritu Santo, the highly volatile convoy was spotted by Japanese aircraft on 15 October. All but Vireo and Meredith beat a hasty retreat.

Cautiously proceeding, the pair beat off a two-plane Japanese attack before they received word that Japanese surface ships were in the area. Only then did they reverse course. At noon, Meredith ordered old, slow, and vulnerable Vireo abandoned and took off her crew. Meredith then stood off to torpedo the tug at 1215 so that she would not fall into enemy hands intact. Suddenly, a whirlwind of destruction swept down from the sky and descended upon the destroyer. Like hawks, 38 planes from the Japanese carrier Zuikaku pounced on Meredith and deluged her with bombs, torpedoes, and bullets, sinking her in about 15 minutes.

Vireo and the two gasoline barges, however, drifted to leeward, untouched. One life raft, crammed with some of Meredith's survivors, succeeded in intercepting the derelict tug and the men gratefully scrambled aboard. The barges and the tug were later found intact by a PBY naval scout plane which rescued six of the Meredith's crew. When a salvage party boarded Vireo on 21 October, the ship was dead in the water with no lights, no steam, and no power. After abortive attempts to light fires under the boilers, using wood, the tug had to be taken under tow by USS Grayson (DD-435). In company with Grayson and USS Gwin (DD-433), Vireo arrived safely at Espiritu Santo on 23 October.

With a new crew—the majority of her old complement lost in the ordeal with Meredith—she continued to operate in the Guadalcanal area with Task Force 62. She conducted resupply operations to Guadalcanal, towing barges loaded with precious gasoline and bombs and carrying out local escort for other, larger ships, engaged in the same vital duties.

On 3 December, in company with USS Hilo (AGP-2) and towing PT boats, she departed Nouméa and proceeded to Australia. Arriving at Cairns on 9 December, she spent the remainder of the year there, enjoying Christmas and New Year's Day in Australian waters before heading back to the combat area, arriving at Espiritu Santo on 9 January.

=== Return to Guadalcanal operations ===
Operating out of the New Hebrides in early January, she assisted cruisers USS Pensacola (CA-24) and USS Minneapolis (CA-36) as they underwent repairs following damage received at Tassafaronga. Towing barges and firing target bursts for destroyers during gunnery practice off Guadalcanal, the tug continued her operations as before, between that island and Espiritu Santo and Nouméa. It was dull and monotonous duty but necessary and vital, nonetheless.

In April 1943, as American forces advanced on the "island-hopping", "leap-frogging" campaigns against the Japanese in the South Pacific, Japanese Admiral Yamamoto initiated operation "I." Yamamoto aimed this stroke at Papua, in the hope of compensating for the loss of Guadalcanal, by destroying the American advance base there and thus slowing or stopping the Allied advance. The new Japanese thrust began on 7 April when large formations of Japanese planes swept down from Rabaul to attack American shipping in Lunga Roads between Guadalcanal and Tulagi.

Among these ships, there lay Vireo, engaged in her usual harbor activities. Pathfinder was engaged in taking soundings; also near were USS Ortolan (ASR-5) and SC-521. Shortly before the attack came, USS Aaron Ward (DD-483) passed by, escorting LST-U9. Three Japanese dive bombers swooped down out of the sun and severely damaged the destroyer with their lethal loads. Ortolan and Vireo took the crippled Aaron Ward under tow, but the destroyer sank three miles short of Tulagi.

=== The Battle of Kula Gulf ===
As the New Georgia campaign got underway and American forces advanced further up the chain of islands in the southwest Pacific, Vireo continued her operations out of Tulagi, Espiritu Santo, or Nouméa. In the pre-dawn darkness of 13 July, the Battle of Kula Gulf was fought between Japanese and American surface forces, the latter augmented by New Zealand cruiser Leander. In the action which followed, USS Honolulu (CL-48), USS St. Louis (CL-49), and Leander were damaged. Later that day, Vireo, in company with USS Rail (AT-139) set out to assist in getting the cripples home and towed Honolulu to haven at government wharf, Tulagi, where temporary repairs to the cruiser's bow were made.

== Second reclassification ==
For the remainder of 1943 and on into 1944, Vireo followed the Fleet as it inched closer to Japan. In the rearward island areas, she continued her duties as a harbor tug and local escort vessel. On 15 May 1944, Vireo was reclassified as an ocean-going tug, old, and redesignated ATO-144.

In late July, American forces struck in northwestern New Guinea at Cape Sansapor. Vireo took part in these operations from 30 July to 2 August, engaged in the vital support activities necessary to support the successful landings.

=== Supporting the Philippine invasion ===
After service in the South Pacific Ocean, the old tug moved northward with the invasion armada to liberate the Philippine Islands from the Japanese. On 18 October 1944, American troops stormed ashore on Leyte, keeping General Mac Arthur's promise to return to Philippine soil. Vireo operated in support of these landings into December. She departed Morotai on the 10th, bound for Biak. From there, she proceeded to Leyte, engaged in towing duties.

=== Supporting Okinawa invasion ===
Next—after touching at Hollandia, Manus, and Biak—she took part in the Okinawa operations in April and May 1945. Returning to Morotai, she engaged in towing operations again, this time to Tacloban on the island of Leyte, departing there on 25 May for Subic Bay. For the remainder of the war, she operated between the Philippine Islands and New Guinea, as American forces continued to sweep northward towards the Japanese home islands.

=== End-of-war operations ===
On 20 December 1945, after immediate postwar towing operations at Manila, Luzon, and Samar, she departed Philippine waters on 20 December 1945, in company with USS Rail (ATO-139) and USS Whippoorwill (ATO-169), and headed for the Marshalls.

Following a brief stay at Eniwetok, Vireo got underway on 4 January 1946 and proceeded via Pearl Harbor to the west coast. She arrived at San Francisco, California, on 5 February and reported to the Commandant, 12th Naval District, for disposition.

== Decommissioned ==
As newer and more powerful fleet tugs supplanted the old converted minesweepers, the need for the old vessels decreased. Thus, on 18 April 1946, Vireo was decommissioned, declared surplus to Navy needs, and made available for disposal. Struck from the Navy list on 8 May 1946, Vireo was transferred from the Maritime Commission for disposal on 4 February 1947; but no records of her subsequent fate have survived. However, the Sasaulito News on February 13, 1947, reported that the Vireo had arrived at the Arques Shipyard in Sausalito to be painted in preparation for impending service as Panamanian-flagged lumber boat carrying hardwoods between Long Beach and Panama.

== Military awards and honors ==
- American Defense Service Medal with "FLEET" clasp
- Asiatic-Pacific Campaign Medal with seven battle stars
- World War II Victory Medal
