= Japanese submarine I-70 =

Japanese submarine sunk during WWII

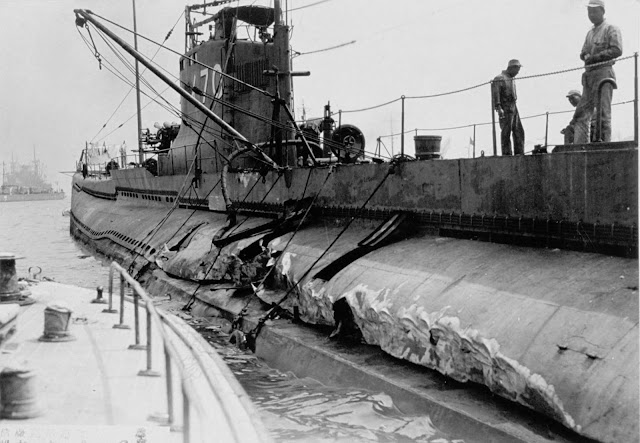
- I-70 docked in Yokosuka for repairs, 12 May 1941

History

Empire of Japan
- Name: I-70
- Builder: Sasebo Naval Arsenal, Sasebo, Japan
- Laid down: 25 January 1933
- Launched: 14 June 1934
- Completed: 9 November 1935
- Commissioned: 9 November 1935
- Decommissioned: 15 December 1938
- Recommissioned: by early 1940
- Home port: Kure, Japan
- Fate: Sunk 10 December 1941

General characteristics
- Class & type: KD6 Type, Kadai type submarine
- Displacement: 1400 (1785 maximum) tons surfaced; 2440 tons submerged
- Length: 104.7 m (343.5 ft)
- Beam: 8.2 m (26.9 ft)
- Draught: 4.58 m (15.0 ft)
- Propulsion: Twin shaft Kampon 9,000 bhp (6,711 kW)/two stroke diesels
- Speed: 23 knots (43 km/h; 26 mph) diesel; 8.2 knots (15.2 km/h; 9.4 mph) electric
- Range: 14,000 nmi (26,000 km; 16,000 mi)
- Test depth: 70 m (230 ft)
- Complement: 60–84 officers and enlisted
- Armament: 6 x torpedo tubes/14 21 in (533 mm) torpedoes; 1 x 100 mm (3.9 in) AA gun; 1 × 13.2 mm (0.52 in) AA gun

I-70 was an Imperial Japanese Navy Kaidai-type cruiser submarine commissioned in 1935. While supporting the Japanese attack on Pearl Harbor at the beginning of the Pacific campaign of World War II in December 1941, she was sunk on the third day of the war, the first fleet submarine lost in the Pacific during the war.

== Construction and commissioning ==
I-70 was laid down on 25 January 1933 at the Sasebo Naval Arsenal in Sasebo, Japan, and launched on 14 June 1934 with Vice Admiral Yonai Mitsumasa — who later served as Minister of the Navy from 1937 to 1939 and as Prime Minister of Japan from January to July 1940 — in attendance for her launching ceremony. She was completed and commissioned on 9 November 1935.

== Service history ==
=== Pre-World War II ===
On the day of her commissioning, I-70 was attached to the Kure Naval District and assigned to Submarine Division 12 as the division′s new flagship. Her division was assigned to Submarine Squadron 2 in the 2nd Fleet, a component of the Combined Fleet, on 15 November 1935. On 13 April 1936, she got underway from Fukuoka, Japan, in company with the other two submarines of her division — I-68 and I-69 — for a training cruise off China in the Qingdao area, which the submarines completed with their arrival at Sasebo on 22 April 1936. The three submarines departed Mako in the Pescadores Islands off Formosa on 4 August 1936 for a training cruise in the Amoy area off China, returning to Mako on 6 September 1936.

On 15 December 1938, I-70 was decommissioned and placed in third reserve in the Kure Naval District. On 24 August 1939, she began a refit and overhaul at the Kure Naval Arsenal in Kure, Japan, during which she received an improved attack computer and a Type 93 passive sonar. Submarine Division 12 was reassigned to Submarine Squadron 3 in the 2nd Fleet on 15 November 1939.

With her refit complete, I-70 was recommissioned in time to join I-68, I-69, and the submarines I-73, I-74, and I-75 for a training cruise, departing Okinawa on 27 March 1940 and training in southern Chinese waters before the six submarines arrived at Takao, Formosa, on 2 April 1940. Submarine Squadron 3 was reassigned to the 6th Fleet on 15 November 1940.

I-69 relieved I-70 as Submarine Division 12 flagship on 26 January 1941, but I-70 resumed her role as division flagship on 30 March 1941. On 12 May 1941, I-70 collided with I-69, suffering a long gash forward in her starboard ballast tanks aft almost as far as her conning tower, while I-69 suffered bow damage. Both submarines reached Yokosuka, Japan, for repairs.

By 11 November 1941, Submarine Squadron 3 had been assigned to the 6th Fleet′s Advance Force. That day, the 6th Fleet's commander, Vice Admiral Mitsumi Shimizu, held a meeting with the commanding officers of the submarines of the squadron aboard his flagship, the light cruiser Katori, and his chief of staff briefed them on plans for Operation Z, the upcoming surprise attack on Pearl Harbor in Hawaii. The attack would begin the Pacific campaign and bring Japan and the United States into World War II.

As Japanese military forces began to deploy for the opening Japanese offensive of the war, I-70 departed Saeki Bay on the coast of Kyushu on 11 November 1941 in company with the submarines I-8, I-68, I-69, I-71, I-72, and I-73 bound for Kwajalein Atoll, which she reached on 20 November 1941. Assigned to support Operation Z, I-70 got underway from Kwajalein on 23 November 1941 and set course for the Hawaiian Islands. While she was en route, she received the message "Climb Mount Niitaka 1208" (Japanese: Niitakayama nobore 1208) from the Combined Fleet on 2 December 1941, indicating that war with the Allies would commence on 8 December 1941 Japan time, which was on 7 December 1941 on the other side of the International Date Line in Hawaii.

=== World War II ===
==== First war patrol ====
Along with the rest of Submarine Squadron 3, I-70 was part of a group of submarines ordered to patrol south of Oahu during the attack on Pearl Harbor, with orders to attack American ships attempting to sortie from Pearl Harbor. The three submarines of Submarine Division 12 were ordered to patrol an area between 25 and 50 nautical miles (46 and 93 km; 29 and 58 mi) south of Oahu, and on 7 December I-70 was operating about 10 nautical miles (19 km; 12 mi) off the entrance to Pearl Harbor. The 6th Fleet′s headquarters aboard Katori at Kwajalein attempted to contact her at midnight that night, but she did not respond.

At 01:30 on 9 December 1941, I-70 reported that she was 4 nautical miles (7.4 km; 4.6 mi) southwest of Diamond Head and had sighted the United States Navy aircraft carrier USS Enterprise (CV-6) arriving at Naval Station Pearl Harbor. The Japanese never heard from her again.

==== Loss ====
At 08:40 on 9 December 1941, the Japanese submarine I-6 sighted the United States Navy aircraft carrier USS Enterprise (CV-6) — which she misidentified as a Lexington-class aircraft carrier — and two heavy cruisers north of Molokai steaming northeast at 20 knots (37 km/h; 23 mph). I-6 attempted to attack Enterprise, but was forced to go deep before she could. Several hours later she managed to transmit a sighting report, which resulted in the 6th Fleet ordering nine submarines — Submarine Squadron 1 and several other submarines, including I-70 — to attempt to intercept Enterprise, which the Japanese assumed was bound for the United States West Coast.

After 06:00 on 10 December, an SBD-2 Dauntless dive bomber of U.S. Navy Scouting Squadron 6 (VS-6) from Enterprise sighted I-70 on the surface 121 nautical miles (224 km; 139 mi) northeast of Cape Halawa on the eastern end of Molokai and attacked with a 1,000-pound (450 kg) bomb, scoring a near-miss that inflicted damage on I-70 that prevented her from diving. During the afternoon, another VS-6 SBD sighted I-70 on the surface in the same area. While the dive bomber climbed to 5,000 feet (1,500 m) to gain altitude for an attack, I-70 began a slow starboard turn and opened fire on the Dauntless with her 13.2-millimeter (0.52 in) machine gun; the Dauntless pilot later incorrectly reported that the submarine fired at his aircraft with two deck guns, although I-70 had only one such gun. The dive bomber attacked, its bomb landing alongside I-70 amidships and blowing several of her crew overboard. I-70 went dead in the water and sank on an even keel at 23°45′N 155°35′W 45 seconds after the bomb exploded. The Dauntless′s crew observed four men struggling in the water and saw a bubble of oil and foamy water appear on the surface, followed by two more bubbles containing oil and debris.

The 6th Fleet's headquarters was unable to contact I-70, although it continued to try even after the other two submarines of her division returned to Kwajalein. The Imperial Japanese Navy declared I-70 to be presumed lost with all 93 hands off Hawaii and on 15 March 1942 removed her from the Navy list. She was the first Japanese warship sunk by U.S. aircraft during World War II and the first fleet submarine lost in the Pacific campaign of World War II.
