= Japanese ship Tone =

At least three warships of Japan have borne the name Tone:

- Japanese cruiser Tone (1907), a protected cruiser; participated in the World War I Siege of Tsingtao; stricken in 1931 and sunk as an aircraft target in 1933
- Japanese cruiser Tone (1937), lead ship of the Tone class of heavy cruisers; sunk in the July 1945 Bombing of Kure; raised and scrapped, 1947–1948
- JS Tone, an Abukuma-class destroyer escort launched in 1991
