= USS Sunnadin (AT-28) =

Tugboat of the United States Navy

History

United States
- Name: Sunnadin (AT-28)
- Namesake: Huron Indian town Sunyendeand
- Builder: Puget Sound Navy Yard
- Laid down: 3 December 1918 as Katahdin
- Launched: 28 February 1919
- Commissioned: 20 October 1919
- Decommissioned: 4 April 1946
- Renamed: Sunnadin on 24 February 1919
- Stricken: 8 May 1946
- Fate: Sold for scrap, 15 January 1947

General characteristics
- Class & type: Bagaduce class
- Displacement: 1,000 (est.)
- Length: 156 feet 8 inches
- Beam: 30 feet
- Draft: 14 foot 7 inches (mean)
- Speed: 13.0 kts (est.)
- Complement: 44
- Armament: 1 mg.

The first USS Sunnadin (AT-28), a tug, was laid down on 3 December 1918 at the Puget Sound Navy Yard as Katahdin; renamed Sunnadin on 24 February 1919; launched on 28 February 1919; and commissioned on 20 October 1919. It was named for an Anglicized spelling of the Huron Indian town Sunyendeand.

Sunnadin was assigned to the 14th Naval District and spent almost a quarter of a century in the Hawaiian Islands operating from Pearl Harbor, towing Navy ships and other sea-going craft between ports in the district. During that time, she changed designations twice. On 17 July 1920 when the Navy first adopted alphanumeric hull designations, she became AT-28.

She was in Pearl Harbor during the Japanese attack there on 7 December 1941. On 15 May 1944, she was redesignated ATO-28. In the fall of 1945, Sunnadin was ordered to report to the Commandant, 12th Naval District, for decommissioning and disposal. Sunnadin was decommissioned on 4 April 1946. Her name was struck from the Navy list on 8 May 1946. On 15 January 1947, she was delivered to the Maritime Commission at Mare Island, California, for disposal.

== Honors ==
Sunnadin earned one battle star during World War II.
