= Japanese submarine I-73 =

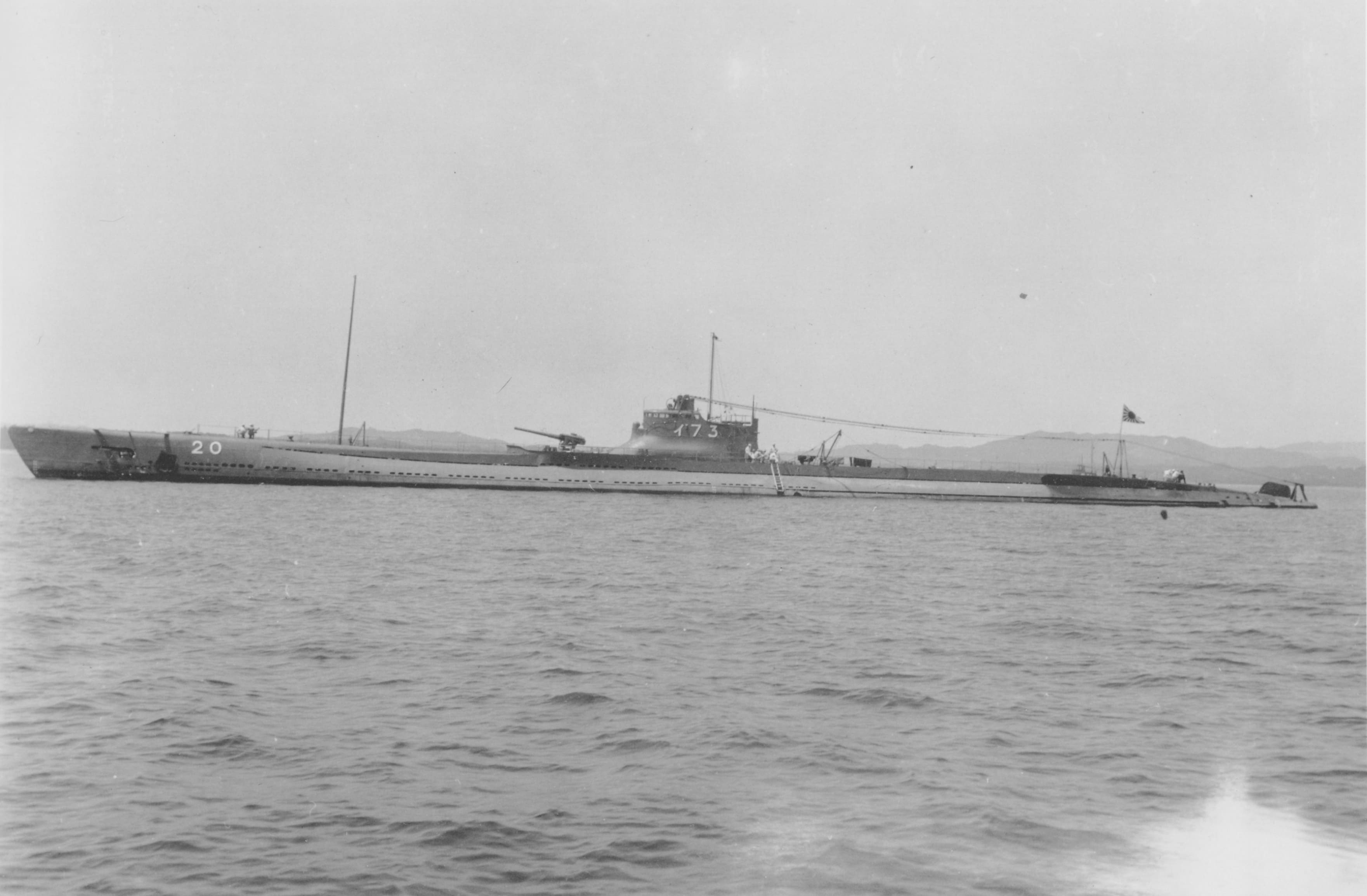
- I-73 operating off Japan, 24 April 1939

History

Empire of Japan
- Name: I-73
- Builder: Kawasaki, Kobe, Japan
- Laid down: 5 April or 5 November 1934 (see text)
- Launched: 20 June 1935
- Completed: 7 January 1937
- Commissioned: 7 January 1937
- Fate: Sunk, 27 January 1942
- Stricken: 15 March 1942

General characteristics
- Class & type: Kaidai type (KD6A sub-class)
- Displacement: 1,814 tonnes (1,785 long tons) surfaced; 2,479 tonnes (2,440 long tons) submerged
- Length: 104.7 m (343 ft 6 in)
- Beam: 8.2 m (26 ft 11 in)
- Draft: 4.57 m (15 ft 0 in)
- Installed power: 9,000 bhp (6,700 kW) (diesels); 1,800 hp (1,300 kW) (electric motors)
- Propulsion: Diesel-electric; 2 × diesel engines; 2 × electric motors
- Speed: 23 knots (43 km/h; 26 mph) surfaced; 8 knots (15 km/h; 9.2 mph) submerged
- Range: 14,000 nmi (26,000 km; 16,000 mi) at 10 knots (19 km/h; 12 mph) surfaced; 65 nmi (120 km; 75 mi) at 3 knots (5.6 km/h; 3.5 mph) submerged
- Test depth: 75 m (246 ft)
- Complement: 70
- Armament: 6 × 533 mm (21 in) torpedo tubes (4 bow, 2 stern); 1 × 100 mm (3.9 in) deck gun; 1 × 13.2 mm (0.52 in) anti-aircraft machinegun

I-73 was an Imperial Japanese Navy Kaidai type cruiser submarine of the KD6A sub-class commissioned in 1937 that served during World War II. One month after participating in the Japanese attack on Pearl Harbor, she was sunk by the United States Navy submarine USS Gudgeon in January 1942.

== Design and description ==
The submarines of the KD6A sub-class were versions of the preceding KD5 sub-class with greater surface speed and diving depth. They displaced 1,814 tonnes (1,785 long tons) surfaced and 2,479 tonnes (2,440 long tons) submerged. The submarines were 104.7 meters (343 ft 6 in) long, had a beam of 8.2 meters (26 ft 11 in) and a draft of 4.57 meters (15 ft 0 in). The boats had a diving depth of 75 m (246 ft)

For surface running, the submarines were powered by two 4,500-brake-horsepower (3,356 kW) diesel engines, each driving one propeller shaft. When submerged each propeller was driven by a 900-horsepower (671 kW) electric motor. They could reach 23 knots (43 km/h; 26 mph) on the surface and 8 knots (15 km/h; 9.2 mph) underwater. On the surface, the KD6As had a range of 14,000 nautical miles (26,000 km; 16,000 mi) at 10 knots (19 km/h; 12 mph); submerged, they had a range of 65 nmi (120 km; 75 mi) at 3 knots (5.6 km/h; 3.5 mph).

The submarines were armed with six internal 53.3 cm (21.0 in) torpedo tubes, four in the bow and two in the stern. They carried a total of 14 torpedoes. They also were armed with one 100 mm (3.9 in) deck gun and a 13.2 mm (0.52 in) anti-aircraft machinegun.

== Construction and career ==
One of the vessels constructed as part of Japan's 1st Naval Armaments Supplement Programme in 1931, I-73 was laid down on either 5 April or 5 November 1934 (according to different sources) at the Kawasaki Shipyard in Kobe, Japan. Both launched and numbered I-73 on 20 June 1935, she was completed and commissioned on 7 January 1937.

== Service history ==
=== Pre-World War II ===
On the day of her commissioning, I-73 was attached to the Kure Naval District and assigned to Submarine Division 20. Her division was assigned to Submarine Squadron 2 in the 2nd Fleet, a component of the Combined Fleet, on 1 December 1937, and then to Submarine Squadron 3 in the 2nd Fleet on 15 November 1939. I-73 departed Okinawa on 27 March 1940 in company with the submarines I-68, I-69, I-70, I-74, and I-75 for a training cruise in southern Chinese waters, completing it when the six submarines arrived at Takao, Formosa, on 2 April 1940. On 15 November 1940, Submarine Squadron 3 was reassigned to the 6th Fleet, another component of the Combined Fleet. On 16 January 1941, the submarine I-72 temporarily relieved I-73 as flagship of Submarine Division 20.

On 11 November 1941, I-73 was assigned to the 6th Fleet's Advance Force. That day, the 6th Fleet's commander, Vice Admiral Mitsumi Shimizu, held a meeting with the commanding officers of the submarines of Submarine Squadron 3 aboard his flagship, the light cruiser Katori, and his chief of staff briefed them on plans for Operation Z, the upcoming surprise attack on Pearl Harbor in Hawaii. The attack would begin the Pacific campaign and bring Japan and the United States into World War II.

As Japanese military forces began to deploy for the opening Japanese offensive of the war, I-73 — with the commander of Submarine Division 20 embarked — departed Saeki Bay on the coast of Kyushu on 11 November 1941 in company with the submarines I-8, I-68, I-69, I-70, I-71, and I-72 bound for Kwajalein Atoll, which she reached on 20 November 1941. Assigned to support Operation Z, I-73 got underway from Kwajalein on 23 November 1941, again with the commander of Submarine Division 20 embarked, and set course for the Hawaiian Islands. While she was en route, she received the message "Climb Mount Niitaka 1208" (Japanese: Niitakayama nobore 1208) from the Combined Fleet on 2 December 1941, indicating that war with the Allies would commence on 8 December 1941 Japan time, which was on 7 December 1941 on the other side of the International Date Line in Hawaii. After reaching Hawaiian waters, she conducted a reconnaissance of Kealaikahiki Channel between Kahoolawe and Lanai on 5 December 1941 and of Lahaina Roads off Maui after sunset on 6 December 1941.

=== World War II ===
==== First war patrol ====
By 7 December 1941, the day of the Pearl Harbor attack, Submarine Squadron 3 was deployed south of Oahu, ordered to reconnoiter the area and attack any American ships that sortied from Pearl Harbor. As part of this deployment, I-73 was stationed off the entrance to Pearl Harbor. Her time off Oahu passed uneventfully, and on 17 December 1941 she departed Hawaiian waters to make for Kwajalein.

Along the way, I-73 was diverted from her voyage to bombard Johnston Atoll. She arrived off the atoll on 23 December 1941 and fired six 100-millimeter (3.9 in) rounds, knocking down the Civil Aeronautics Authority homing tower on Sand Islet, wounding one United States Marine, and later claiming a hit on a utility pole. The United States Marine Corps 5-inch (127 mm) gun battery on Johnston Island returned fire, each of its guns firing ten rounds before I-73 submerged and departed the area unharmed. She arrived at Kwajalein on 29 December 1941.

=== Second war patrol ===
With the commander of Submarine Division 20 again embarked, I-73 got underway from Kwajalein in company with I-71 and I-72, the three submarines having orders to relieve the submarines I-18, I-22, and I-24 on a picket line in Hawaiian waters. I-73 transmitted a situation report from her assigned patrol area on 15 January 1942. She often is credited incorrectly with shelling Midway Atoll on 25 January 1942, but I-24 conducted that bombardment.

=== Loss ===
On 27 January 1942, the United States Navy submarine USS Gudgeon was on her return voyage from a war patrol off the Bungo Strait in Japanese waters and was 240 nautical miles (440 km; 280 mi) west of Midway Atoll in the Northwestern Hawaiian Islands when she received an Ultra message informing her that I-18, I-22, and I-24 were approaching her. She steered to intercept them, but did not encounter them. While submerged and searching for them, however, she detected the sound of high-speed propellers off her port bow at 09:00 local time. She then sighted I-73 at a range of 5,000 yards (4,600 m), identifying her as an "I-68-class submarine" with a deck gun forward of her conning tower and at least six men on her bridge, making 15 knots (28 km/h; 17 mph) on a heading of 255 degrees True. Gudgeon fired three Mark 14 torpedoes at I-73 at a range of 1,800 yards (1,600 m) at 09:07 local time, then lost sight of her in heavy seas. One minute and 45 seconds after firing the torpedoes, Gudgeon′s crew heard two explosions, after which I-73′s propeller noises stopped. Gudgeon returned to periscope depth and saw no sign of I-73. She claimed only to have damaged I-73, but Station HYPO, a U.S. Navy signals intelligence unit in Hawaii, confirmed that Gudgeon had sunk I-73. Sunk at 28°24′N 178°35′E, I-73 was the first warship ever sunk by a U.S. submarine.

Some Japanese historians claim that I-73 survived Gudgeon's attack and view it as more likely that the destroyer USS Jarvis, the destroyer minesweeper USS Long, and other U.S. Navy forces sank her south of Pearl Harbor on 28 January 1942 at 20°35′N 155°55′W.

The Imperial Japanese Navy declared I-73 to be presumed lost with all 94 hands off Hawaii and on 10 March 1942 administratively transferred her to the fourth reserve at Kure Japan, pending final disposition. The Japanese removed her from the Navy list on 15 March 1942.
