= USS Kaloli =

History

United States
- Ordered: as Flying A
- Laid down: date unknown
- Launched: 1941
- Acquired: 29 April 1942
- Commissioned: 29 April 1942
- Decommissioned: 7 December 1945
- Stricken: 3 January 1946
- Identification: IMO number: 5116945
- Fate: fate unknown

General characteristics
- Displacement: 3,610 tons(fl)
- Length: 258 ft (79 m)
- Beam: 43 ft (13 m)
- Draught: 14 ft 10 in (4.52 m)
- Propulsion: 2x DeLaVergne diesel marine Engines 3VO: 3 cylinder, 230 hp @ 400 rpm
- Speed: 9.5 knots
- Complement: 63
- Armament: one single 3 in (76 mm) dual purpose gun mount, four single 20 mm gun mounts

USS Kaloli (AOG-13) was a gasoline tanker acquired by the U.S. Navy for the dangerous task of transporting gasoline to warships in the fleet, and to remote Navy stations.

Kaloli was launched in 1941 as Flying A by the Charleston Shipbuilding & Drydock Co., Charleston, South Carolina; owned by Tidewater Associated Oil Co., San Francisco, California; and acquired and commissioned by the Navy at Honolulu, Hawaii, 29 April 1942.

== World War II service ==
Taken over on time charter through the Maritime Commission, Kaloli served as a unit of Service Squadron 8, supplying forward island depots in the Pacific Ocean with military supplies and material.

=== Supporting the Pacific Fleet ===
Operating out of Pearl Harbor, she ranged the Central Pacific and provided logistic support for bases at Midway, Johnston, Canton, Christmas, and Palmyra Islands. She conducted over 40 fueling missions to these islands between 28 May 1942 and 3 July 1945, carrying over 20 million gallons of aviation gasoline as well as lesser quantities of commercial gasoline and diesel fuel. Though she was never in combat, her service to combat ships of the Navy was both efficient and valuable.

Kaloli shuttled fuel among various tank farms in the Hawaiian Islands from July to October 1945. On 11 October she cleared Pearl Harbor for the U.S. West Coast, arriving San Diego, California, 23 October. She departed the 29th for the eastern seaboard, and, after transiting the Panama Canal 12 November, she arrived New York 25 November.

== Post-war decommissioning ==
Kaloli decommissioned 7 December and transferred to the Maritime Commission for return to her former owner. She was struck from the Navy List 3 January 1946. Final disposition: fate unknown.

== Military awards and honors ==
Kaloli’s crew was eligible for the following medals:

- American Campaign Medal
- Asiatic-Pacific Campaign Medal
- World War II Victory Medal
