= USS Cockatoo (AMc-8) =

Minesweeper of the United States Navy

- USS Cockatoo inboard profile drawing

History

United States
- Name: USS Cockatoo
- Builder: Seattle Shipbuilding and Dry Dock Company, Seattle, Washington
- Launched: 1936, as Vashon
- Acquired: 23 October 1940
- Commissioned: 25 April 1941, as USS Cockatoo (AMc-8)
- Fate: Transferred to the Maritime Commission, 23 September 1946. Fate unknown.

General characteristics
- Type: Coastal minesweeper
- Displacement: 185 long tons (188 t)
- Length: 88 ft (27 m)
- Beam: 23 ft 4 in (7.11 m)
- Draft: 8 ft 11 in (2.72 m)
- Propulsion: 1 × 240 bhp (179 kW) Atlas 4HM 2124 diesel engine, one shaft
- Speed: 9 knots (17 km/h; 10 mph)
- Complement: 17
- Armament: 1 × .50 cal (12.7 mm) machine gun

USS Cockatoo was a coastal minesweeper, built in 1936 as Vashon by the Seattle Construction and Dry Dock Company, Seattle, Washington, which was acquired by the United States Navy on 23 October 1940 and commissioned as USS Cockatoo (AMc-8), on 25 April 1941.

Cockatoo was placed in service on 25 April 1941 and operated in the 14th Naval District from Pearl Harbor where she was undamaged during the attack on Pearl Harbor throughout World War II. She was transferred to the Maritime Commission for disposal on 23 September 1946.
