= USS Crossbill (AMc-9) =

Coastal minesweeper of the United States Navy in the early 1940s

History

United States
- Name: USS Crossbill
- Builder: Watchorn Yacht and Boat Works, San Pedro, California
- Launched: 1937, as North Star
- Acquired: 31 October 1940
- Commissioned: 22 March 1941
- Decommissioned: 1947

General characteristics
- Type: Coastal minesweeper
- Displacement: 213 long tons (216 t)
- Length: 81 ft 6 in (24.84 m)
- Beam: 22 ft 3 in (6.78 m)
- Draft: 9 ft 4 in (2.84 m)
- Propulsion: 1 × 260 bhp (194 kW) Western APB diesel engine, one shaft
- Speed: 9.5 knots (17.6 km/h; 10.9 mph)
- Complement: 17
- Armament: 1 × .50 cal (12.7 mm) machine gun

USS Crossbill (AMc-9) was a coastal minesweeper of the United States Navy. Built in 1937 as North Star by the Watchorn Yacht and Boat Works, San Pedro, California, the ship was acquired by the U.S. Navy on 31 October 1940, and commissioned as USS Crossbill (AMc 9) on 22 March 1941. Crossbill operated in an in-service status attached to the 14th Naval District from 1941 to 1947. Crossbill was decommissioned in 1947; its fate is unknown.
