= USS Turkey (AM-13) =

Minesweeper of the United States Navy

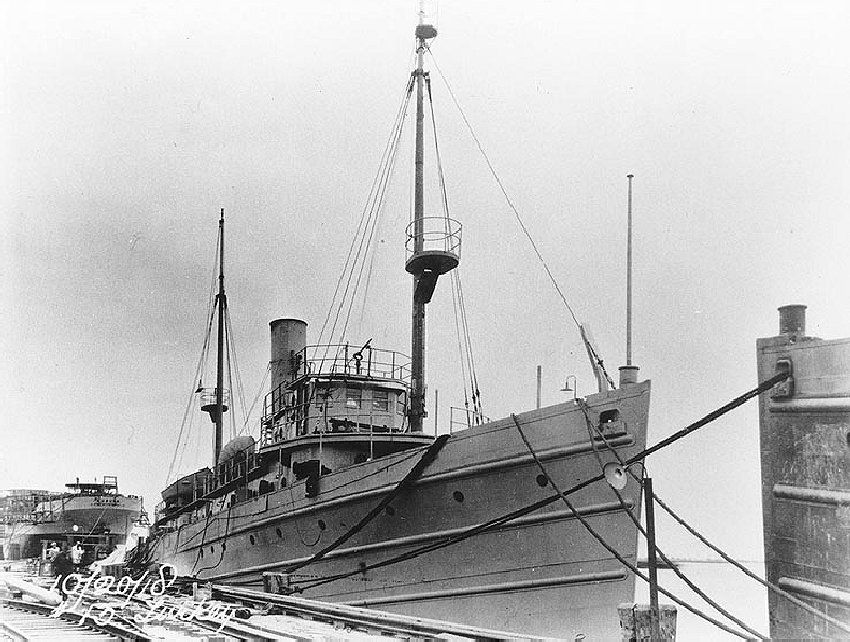

History

United States
- Name: USS Turkey
- Namesake: Turkey (bird)
- Builder: Chester Shipbuilding, Chester, Pennsylvania
- Laid down: 19 August 1917
- Launched: 30 April 1918, as Minesweeper No.13
- Commissioned: 13 December 1918
- Decommissioned: 6 November 1945
- Reclassified: AM-13, 17 July 1920; AT-143, 1 June 1942; ATO-143, 15 May 1944
- Stricken: 28 November 1945
- Honours and awards: 1 battle star (World War II)
- Fate: Sold for scrap, 30 December 1946

General characteristics
- Class & type: Lapwing-class minesweeper
- Displacement: 840 long tons (853 t)
- Length: 187 ft 10 in (57.25 m)
- Beam: 35 ft 6 in (10.82 m)
- Draft: 8 ft 10 in (2.69 m)
- Speed: 14 knots (26 km/h; 16 mph)
- Complement: 85
- Armament: 2 × 3 in (76 mm) guns

USS Turkey (AM-13) was a Lapwing-class minesweeper the United States Navy, thus named after the bird, not after the country which in 1917 was an enemy in the ongoing World War I. The minesweeper was acquired by for the dangerous task of removing mines from minefields laid in the water to prevent ships from passing.

Turkey (Minesweeper No. 13) was laid down on 19 August 1917 at Chester, Pennsylvania, by the Chester Shipbuilding Co.; launched on 30 April 1918; sponsored by Mrs. W. T. Smith; and commissioned on 13 December 1918.

== Clearance of World War I mines ==
Although completed too late to see service during World War I, Turkey took part in the gigantic operation to clear the mine barrage which had been laid in the North Sea during this conflict. This system of minefields constituted a formidable obstacle to the resumption of trade in the aftermath of the war. After steaming across the Atlantic Ocean, the new minesweeper arrived at Kirkwall, Scotland, on 20 April 1919 and joined the American forces massing there to begin clearing the shipping lanes between Scotland and Norway.

=== Turkey strikes a mine ===
Soon thereafter, Turkey got underway for mine-sweeping operations in the North Sea. During her second operation (which ran from 8 to 29 May), a mine exploded directly beneath Turkey on 16 May. The disabled minesweeper crept to Lyness, at Scapa Flow, where she was drydocked for repairs.

Her damage was corrected in time for Turkey to take part in the project's fifth operation, commencing on 22 July. Eight days later, the minesweeper suffered a condenser failure. After receiving a cannibalized unit from the disabled USS Pelican, she resumed operations in mid-August.

Fair weather conditions, unusual for the North Sea, enabled the ships to make excellent progress. While thus engaged, Turkey fouled a mine in her sweep gear; and it exploded close aboard, causing minor damage. However, the ship effected quick repairs at sea and continued operations without missing the proverbial step. By 16 August, Turkey's group had swept a record 1,373 mines.

=== Oriole damaged by a mine ===
Deteriorating weather conditions, however, hampered the clearing of group 13, in an operation begun on 5 September. After delaying putting to sea due to heavy fog, the ships got underway to carry out their assignment but seemed dogged with misfortune and bad luck from the beginning. USS Oriole snared a mine which exploded in one of her "kites", damaging both kite and ship and forcing her to limp home. USS Swan closed Turkey to obtain more sweep wire to replace her depleted stock, but the capricious sea slammed the two ships together, forcing USS Swan out of action and back to port for repairs.

=== Completion of North Sea mine clearance ===
By November 1919, the colossal job of sweeping the barrage had been completed. On 25 November, Turkey and her 34 sister ships received orders detaching them from duty in the North Sea. Taking on fuel at Brest, France, Turkey departed European waters but soon ran into bad weather off the Azores. Bucking heavy seas and high winds, the ship used a large amount of her fuel and exhausted it completely, long before she reached Bermuda. Destroyer tender USS Panther passed a towline to the minesweeper and eventually brought her to Bermuda.

== Assignment to the Pacific Fleet ==
Following her return to the United States, Turkey began operating out of New York in the waters of the 3rd Naval District. On 17 July 1920, the minesweeper was designated AM-13 when the U.S. Navy adopted its modern alphanumeric system of hull numbers. In 1921, the ship shifted to the Pacific Ocean to join the Pacific Fleet Train. Based at Pearl Harbor, she operated as part of Mine Division 4 and Mine Division 6 until decommissioned there on 12 April 1922.

After 15 years in reserve, Turkey returned to the West Coast of the United States in September 1937 and was fitted out at the Mare Island Navy Yard, Vallejo, California. Recommissioned there on 15 August 1938, Turkey subsequently operated out of San Pedro, Los Angeles, through 1939.

As the Fleet shifted to Pearl Harbor in late 1939 and early 1940, Turkey followed and operated out of Pearl Harbor into 1941. On 7 December of that year, she lay moored in a nest of her sister ships at the Coal Docks at Pearl Harbor, when Japanese planes launched a surprise attack on the unsuspecting Pacific Fleet.

== Japanese planes attack Pearl Harbor ==
A Naval Reserve ensign, who had experienced only six months of sea duty, led the ship's defense until her commanding officer could return to the ship. The crew tumbled to battle stations at the sound of the general quarters alarm and quickly manned the main battery of two 3-inch guns. In addition, two Lewis guns atop the tall pilot house went into action. A number of riflemen armed with Springfield 1903 bolt-action rifles roamed the decks looking for good vantage points from which to fire at the attacking planes. Twenty minutes after the raid began, Turkey backed clear of the next ship to improve her field of fire and continued the fight.

When all Japanese planes had departed the area, Turkey and her sister ships labored to salvage the critically damaged battleships which were partially sunk in the mud and oily waters off Ford Island. Turkey remained engaged in these operations until 1 April 1942, when she departed Pearl Harbor for Samoan waters.

=== Pacific Theatre operations ===
Relieving USS Kingfisher as station ship at Samoa, Turkey operated in Samoan waters through the end of the year and into 1943. She conducted minesweeping patrols, provided local escort services, and towed targets for the United States Marines shore batteries on Samoa. On 1 June 1942, she was reclassified as an ocean-going tug and given the designation AT-143. She also supported Marine raider landing exercises.

=== Discovering castaways ===
On 14 April 1943, Turkey visited Bowditch Island on an inspection and discovered two castaways who had been there for nearly a month. The two had been treated well by the local populace and were in good shape. After receiving repairs from 21 to 30 April, the minesweeper became station ship at Tutuila. She returned to Pearl Harbor in June and thence proceeded to the U.S. West Coast and a major overhaul at Mare Island, California. Following trials off the west coast, she headed for Hawaii and arrived at Pearl Harbor on 20 October.

Operating out of the Fleet's Hawaiian base, Turkey towed targets for naval aircraft and recovered practice torpedoes through January 1944. Operating as a unit of Service Squadron 6, she conducted these activities through late February, after which she underwent more repair work at Pearl Harbor from 1 March to 24 April.

Following post-repair trials and practice torpedo-recovery operations in Hawaiian waters, she headed for the Marshalls on 10 May 1944 – in company with USS Preserver and towing barges YOGL-7 and YW-68 – and arrived at Majuro on 25 May. Five days later, Turkey headed for Kwajalein with YF-412 and YF-383 in tow and in company with ATR-46, making port there on 1 June. Upon delivering her tows, she proceeded back to Majuro. Meanwhile, on 15 May 1944, she had been reclassified as an old ocean tug and redesignated ATO-143.

=== Providing ammunition for the larger ships ===
On 4 June, she commenced ammunition replenishment operations at that base for cruisers USS Santa Fe, USS Biloxi, and USS Mobile. For the remainder of the summer, Turkey operated in the Marshalls, towing small barges between Majuro, Kwajalein, and Eniwetok, undergoing a brief overhaul alongside USS Ajax at Majuro from 29 August to 2 September and conducting harbor operations. Then, on 5 October, she headed for Ulithi.

After harbor duty there, she sailed for Ngulu Atoll on 17 October to assist in salvage operations for USS Montgomery, which had been damaged by a mine explosion earlier that day. She returned to Ulithi on the 23rd and, four days later, assisted the torpedo-damaged USS Houston into the harbor after the cruiser had been struck off Formosa by a Japanese aircraft-launched torpedo.

=== Sinking of Mississinewa ===
While Turkey was towing YOG-21 alongside USS Essex, the minesweeper's foremast caught in one of the carrier's flight deck radio antenna braces and was broken in three places. On 21 November, Turkey went to the assistance of the tanker USS Mississinewa which had been struck by a Japanese manned torpedo. The minesweeper closed to help put out the fires. Despite valiant firefighting efforts, the oiler rolled over and sank some three hours later, the war's first victim of Japan's kaiten.

Following a short overhaul period at Ulithi in December 1944, Turkey commenced assisting in fueling operations of Fleet carriers there early in January 1945; and, but for a brief drydock period from 9 to 13 January, she continued the task through the end of the month.

=== Iwo Jima operations ===
In early February, she assisted in preparations for the Iwo Jima landings before proceeding, via Kossol Roads in the Palaus, to San Pedro Bay, off Leyte. Turkey then continued operations as part of the Service Squadron, South Pacific Forces, in harbor activities at Ulithi in March through May 1945. After getting underway again for Leyte on 7 May, she served as a retriever for a tow convoy, keeping a lookout for barges and other craft which might slip their tows en route. Arriving in San Pedro Bay on 13 May, she commenced harbor operations and continued them until 7 June, when she began 10 days of upkeep alongside USS Prometheus.

=== End-of-war activity ===
She operated between Leyte and Ulithi through the end of hostilities in mid-August before stopping at Kwajalein on the 24th. On 30 August, she got underway for Hawaii and reached Pearl Harbor on 11 September. From there, she proceeded to San Francisco.

== Decommissioning ==
Turkey was decommissioned on 6 November 1945; struck from the Navy list on 28 November 1945; and sold and delivered to the Hawley Forge and Manufacturing Co., of San Francisco on 30 December 1946.

== Awards ==
Turkey received one battle star for her World War II service.
