= USS Rail (AM-26) =

Minesweeper of the United States Navy

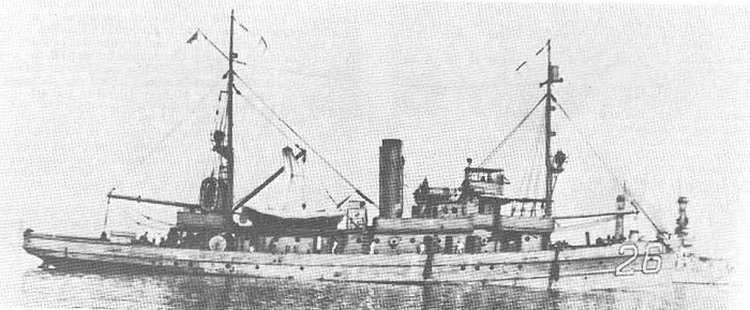

History

United States
- Name: USS Rail
- Builder: Puget Sound Navy Yard, Bremerton, Washington
- Laid down: 15 December 1917
- Launched: 25 April 1918
- Commissioned: 5 June 1918, as Minesweeper No.26
- Decommissioned: 29 April 1946
- Reclassified: AM-26, 17 July 1920; AT-139, 1 June 1942; ATO-139, 15 May 1944
- Honours and awards: 6 battle stars (World War II)
- Fate: Transferred to Maritime Commission for disposal, 17 January 1947

General characteristics
- Class & type: Lapwing-class minesweeper
- Displacement: 840 long tons (853 t)
- Length: 187 ft 10 in (57.25 m)
- Beam: 35 ft 6 in (10.82 m)
- Draft: 10 ft 4 in (3.15 m)
- Speed: 14 knots (26 km/h; 16 mph)
- Complement: 72
- Armament: 2 × 3 in (76 mm)/50 caliber guns; 2 × machine guns

USS Rail (AM-26/AT-139/ATO-139) was a Lapwing-class minesweeper built for the United States Navy during World War I. She was the first U.S. Navy ship named for the rail, a small wading bird, related to the cranes.

Rail, a single-screw, steel "bird"-class minesweeper, was laid down on 15 December 1917 by the Puget Sound Navy Yard, Bremerton, Washington; launched 25 April 1918; sponsored by Mrs. Robert Morgan; and commissioned on 5 June 1918.

== World War I North Atlantic operations ==
Assigned to the Atlantic, Rail departed Bremerton, Washington, on 25 June. Reaching Key West, Florida, on 11 August, she continued on to Norfolk, Virginia, where she conducted minesweeping operations and training exercises into 1919. In March of that year, she sailed north to Boston, Massachusetts, then east to Inverness, Scotland, where on 20 April she joined the North Sea Minesweeping Detachment. Eight days later the detachment began the first of seven operations, which, during the summer, cleared the barrage laid down by the U.S. and Royal Navies between the Orkney Islands and the coast of Norway to block the entry of German ships into the Atlantic Ocean.

On 2 May, the detachment completed the first sweep and put into Kirkwall, Scotland, its new base of operations for the remaining six sweeps. Damaged on 8 July and 29 August by mines which fouled her kite and exploded, Rail remained with the detachment through the completion of the 7th sweeping operation on 19 September. The detachment then prepared to return to the United States. On 15 October, Rail with others of her class departed Devonport and, after several stops en route, arrived at Tompkinsville, New York, on 20 November 1919.

Within the week the North Sea Minesweeping Detachment was disbanded and Rail moved south, to Norfolk, for overhaul. Then, reassigned to duty in the North Sea, she returned to Scotland in March 1920 and operated from Rosyth during April, May, and June. On 17 June she sailed for home.

Designated AM-26 on 17 July, Rail remained active with Mine Force, Atlantic, after her return. Based at Norfolk, Virginia, she conducted sweeping exercises off the U.S. East Coast and in the Caribbean, during annual deployments, until 1925. In mid-February 1925, she returned to the Pacific Ocean. Until 12 March, she participated in Fleet Problem V, then into June operated in Hawaiian waters. On 8 June she headed back to the Atlantic Ocean to continue her previous operating schedule, spending several months of each year in the Caribbean, through the decade. In 1932 she redeployed to the Pacific.

== Pacific Theatre deployment ==
Transiting the Panama Canal in February, she steamed north to San Francisco, California, and, into 1934, conducted training exercises and participated in maneuvers off the U.S. West Coast. On 9 April 1934, she departed San Francisco, California, and returned to the U.S. East Coast, only to retransit the Panama Canal late in the year to participate in Fleet Problem XVI, a five-phase exercise to test the fleet's ability to secure advanced bases in the Pacific.

After brief operations out of Pearl Harbor, Rail shifted to San Diego, California in June 1935. Based there for almost three years, she deployed westward only once, to Pearl Harbor for Fleet Problem XVIII in the spring of 1937. In late December 1938, she steamed south to the Panama Canal Zone; operated there for four months; and returned to San Diego, California, in May 1939. She was transferred to Pearl Harbor eleven months later.

== Pearl Harbor under attack by Japanese planes ==
On 7 December 1941, Rail was tied up to the Coal Dock at Pearl Harbor. Within minutes of the start of the Japanese attack, her crew had the enemy under fire with .50 cal (12.7 mm) machine guns. Rescue and salvage work soon commenced, but shortly after noon was interrupted for sweeping operations in the North Channel. On the 8th she resumed salvage operations, and continued them until the 21st. From that day to 19 January 1942, she underwent engine repairs; then, three days later, she stood out of Pearl Harbor as an escort for a ship bound for Johnston Island.

Reclassified as an Ocean Tug AT-139 on 1 June 1942, Rail remained in the Hawaiian area, serving on ASW patrol and conducting experimental minesweeping operations in addition to completing salvage and towing assignments.

== World War II Pacific operations ==
On 26 January 1943, Rail with two barges in tow, headed for Samoa. Arriving on 11 February, she continued on to Nouméa, New Caledonia, and the New Hebrides. In March, she moved up to the Solomons to participate in the Russell Islands offensive, and, through the New Georgia campaign, towed gasoline, oil, and ordnance barges; retrieved landing craft from the beaches; assisted in rescue and salvage operations; and brought damaged merchant and naval ships and craft into Tulagi for repairs.

In mid-September, Rail returned to Nouméa and assumed towing duties in the New Caledonia area. Assigned a tow to the New Hebrides in early January 1944, she spent the latter half of the month en route to and from New Zealand and in February resumed towing operations out of Espiritu Santo.

On 1 June, Rail, now ATO-139 (effective 15 May 1944), departed the Solomons-New Hebrides area and shifted to New Guinea. Arriving at Milne Bay on the 4th, she operated along that coast from Milne Bay to Biak through the summer. In October she visited Cairns, Australia, then resumed operations along the New Guinea coast, in the Admiralties, and, in November, in the Halmaheras. In late November and early December, she towed barges to Leyte, Philippines. Then, toward the end of the year, she departed Manus with the Luzon attack force.

== Philippine invasion support ==
On 5 January 1945, Rail transited Surigao Strait. On the 7th, she entered the South China Sea where Japanese aircraft attempted to turn the Allied force. On the 9th, the ships entered Lingayen Gulf and Rail took up station to give assistance where needed. Through the 18th she provided retrieving, salvage, and towing services at Lingayen. On the 14th, after completing an intelligence and salvage inspection of Yu 3, a sunken Japanese submarine, she continued salvage operations at Lingayen from the 15th - 18th, on the 18th she then moved south with LST-610 in tow to Leyte, whence she returned to Luzon for operation "Mike VII" - the assaults on Zambales province at the end of the month. With no opposition in the San Antonio area, she moved around to Grande Island at the entrance to Subic Bay; assisted the damaged transport, Cavalier; then returned to Leyte, arriving in San Pedro Bay on 4 February.

Two weeks later, the tug returned to New Guinea; underwent overhaul at Hollandia; and, late in April, brought more barges to the Philippines. Arriving at Leyte on 1 May, she remained in the Philippines - operating primarily in the Samar, Leyte, and Luzon areas - until mid-December.

== Decommissioning ==
On the 26th, she departed Guiuan and arrived at San Francisco, California, on 5 February 1946 to begin inactivation. Decommissioned on 29 April 1946, Rail was transferred to the Maritime Commission for disposal on 17 January 1947.

== Awards ==
Rail earned six battle stars during World War II.
