= Japanese submarine Ro-38 =

History

Japan
- Name: Submarine No. 204
- Builder: Mitsubishi, Kobe, Japan
- Laid down: 20 June 1942
- Renamed: Ro-38 on 1 November 1942
- Launched: 24 December 1942
- Completed: 24 July 1943
- Commissioned: 24 July 1943
- Fate: Missing after 19 November 1943; Possibly sunk 24 November 1943
- Stricken: 30 April 1944

General characteristics
- Class & type: Kaichū type submarine (K6 subclass)
- Displacement: 1,133 tonnes (1,115 long tons) surfaced; 1,470 tonnes (1,447 long tons) submerged
- Length: 80.5 m (264 ft 1 in) overall
- Beam: 7 m (23 ft 0 in)
- Draft: 4.07 m (13 ft 4 in)
- Installed power: 4,200 bhp (3,100 kW) (diesel); 1,200 hp (890 kW) (electric motor)
- Propulsion: Diesel-electric; 1 × diesel engine; 1 × electric motor
- Speed: 19.75 knots (36.58 km/h; 22.73 mph) surfaced; 8 knots (15 km/h; 9.2 mph) submerged
- Range: 5,000 nmi (9,300 km; 5,800 mi) at 16 knots (30 km/h; 18 mph) surfaced; 45 nmi (83 km; 52 mi) at 5 knots (9.3 km/h; 5.8 mph) submerged
- Test depth: 80 m (260 ft)
- Crew: 61
- Armament: 4 × bow 533 mm (21 in) torpedo tubes; 1 × 76.2 mm (3.00 in) L/40 anti-aircraft gun; 2 × single 25 mm (1.0 in) AA guns

Ro-38 was an Imperial Japanese Navy Kaichū type submarine of the K6 sub-class. Completed and commissioned in July 1943, she served in World War II and was sunk in November 1943 during her first war patrol.

== Design and description ==
The submarines of the K6 sub-class were versions of the preceding K5 sub-class with greater range and diving depth. They displaced 1,133 tonnes (1,115 long tons) surfaced and 1,470 tonnes (1,447 long tons) submerged. The submarines were 80.5 meters (264 ft 1 in) long, had a beam of 7 meters (23 ft 0 in) and a draft of 4.07 meters (13 ft 4 in). They had a diving depth of 80 meters (260 ft).

For surface running, the boats were powered by two 2,100-brake-horsepower (1,566 kW) diesel engines, each driving one propeller shaft. When submerged each propeller was driven by a 600-horsepower (447 kW) electric motor. They could reach 19.75 knots (36.58 km/h; 22.73 mph) on the surface and 8 knots (15 km/h; 9.2 mph) underwater. On the surface, the K6s had a range of 11,000 nautical miles (20,000 km; 13,000 mi) at 12 knots (22 km/h; 14 mph); submerged, they had a range of 45 nmi (83 km; 52 mi) at 5 knots (9.3 km/h; 5.8 mph).

The boats were armed with four internal bow 53.3 cm (21.0 in) torpedo tubes and carried a total of ten torpedoes. They were also armed with a single 76.2 mm (3.00 in) L/40 anti-aircraft gun and two single 25 mm (1.0 in) AA guns.

== Construction and commissioning ==
Ro-38 was laid down as Submarine No. 204 on 20 June 1942 by Mitsubishi at Kobe, Japan. She was renamed Ro-38 on 1 November 1942, and was provisionally attached to the Maizuru Naval District that day. She was launched on 24 December 1942 and completed and commissioned on 24 July 1943.

== Service history ==
Upon commissioning, Ro-38 was attached formally to the Maizuru Naval District, and on 31 July 1943 she was assigned to Submarine Squadron 11 for workups. On 31 October 1943 she was reassigned to Submarine Division 34 in the 6th Fleet, and she departed Maizuru bound for Truk that day. She arrived at Truk on 8 November 1943.

Ro-38 got underway from Truk on 19 November 1943 to begin her first war patrol, assigned a patrol area in the Gilbert Islands in the vicinity of Makin and Tarawa. The Japanese never heard from her again.

On 20 November 1943, the Battles of Makin and of Tarawa began with the U.S. landings on those atolls. That day, the commander-in-chief of the 6th Fleet, Vice Admiral Takeo Takagi, ordered Ro-38 and the submarines I-19, I-21, I-35, I-39, I-40, I-169, I-174, and I-175 to attack the U.S. invasion fleet off the atolls. On 26 November 1943, Takagi ordered I-19, I-40, I-169, and Ro-38 to form a patrol line north of Makin, with Ro-38 northeast of Makin at the eastern end of the line. The 6th Fleet ordered Ro-38 to move to a new patrol area southeast of Tarawa on 27 November 1943, and on 4 December 1943 it sent her orders to patrol between Tarawa and Canton Island. Ro-38 did not acknowledge any of these orders.

The circumstances of Ro-38′s loss are unknown. It is possible that the United States Navy destroyer USS Cotten (DD-669) sank her west of Tarawa on 24 November 1943. On 2 January 1944, the Imperial Japanese Navy declared her to be presumed lost off the Gilbert Islands with all 77 hands. She was stricken from the Navy list on 30 April 1944.
