= Japanese submarine I-40 =

Type B2 submarine

History

Japan
- Name: Submarine No. 370
- Builder: Kure Naval Arsenal
- Laid down: 18 March 1942
- Renamed: I-40 on 20 August 1942
- Launched: 10 November 1942
- Completed: 31 July 1943
- Commissioned: 31 July 1943
- Fate: Missing after 22 November 1943
- Stricken: 30 April 1944

General characteristics
- Class & type: Type B2 submarine
- Displacement: 2,624 tons surfaced; 3,700 tons submerged
- Length: 356.5 ft (108.7 m)
- Beam: 30.5 ft (9.3 m)
- Draft: 17 ft (5.2 m)
- Propulsion: 2 diesels: 11,000 hp (8,200 kW); Electric motors: 2,000 hp (1,500 kW)
- Speed: 23.5 knots (43.5 km/h) surfaced; 8 knots (15 km/h) submerged
- Range: 14,000 nautical miles (26,000 km) at 16 knots (30 km/h)
- Test depth: 100 m (330 ft)
- Complement: 114
- Armament: 6 × 533 mm (21 in) forward torpedo tubes; 17 torpedoes; 1 × 14 cm (5.5 in) Deck Gun

I-40 was an Imperial Japanese Navy Type B2 submarine. Completed and commissioned in 1943, she served in World War II and disappeared after departing for her first war patrol in November 1943.

== Construction and commissioning ==
I-40 was laid down on 18 March 1942 at the Kure Navy Yard at Kure, Japan, with the name Submarine No. 370. Renamed I-40 on 20 August 1942 and provisionally attached to the Yokosuka Naval District that day, she was launched on 10 November 1942. She was completed and commissioned on 31 July 1943.

== Service history ==
Upon commissioning, I-40 was attached formally to the Yokosuka Naval District and assigned to Submarine Squadron 11 in the 1st Fleet for work-ups. During August 1943, she took part in testing of sonar and magnetic anomaly detector equipment in the Seto Inland Sea, serving as an antisubmarine warfare target for the minelayer Nuwajima.

With her work-ups completed, I-40 was reassigned to Submarine Division 1 in Submarine Squadron 2 in the 6th Fleet on 31 October 1943. She departed Yokosuka on 13 November 1943 bound for Truk, which she reached on 19 November 1943.

The Gilbert and Marshall Islands campaign began on 20 November 1943 with the U.S. invasion of Tarawa and of Makin in the Gilbert Islands. That day, I-40 and the submarines I-19, I-21, I-35, I-39, I-169, I-174, I-175, and Ro-38 all received orders to proceed to the Gilberts and oppose the invasion. I-40 got underway from Truk on 22 November 1943 to begin her first war patrol, assigned a patrol area off Makin Island. The Japanese never heard from her again.

On 26 November 1943, the 6th Fleet ordered I-40 to join I-19, I-169 and Ro-38 in forming a picket line north of Makin, and on 2 December 1943 it ordered I-19, I-20, and I-40 to report their positions. I-40 did not respond to either message.

The circumstances of I-40′s loss remain a mystery. The destroyer USS Boyd (DD-544) sank a Japanese submarine southwest of Tarawa on 23 November 1943 which probably was I-39 but could have been I-40. It also has been proposed that land-based United States Navy aircraft teamed with the destroyer USS Radford (DD-446) to sink her and that Radford alone sank her.

On 21 February 1944, the Imperial Japanese Navy declared I-40 to be presumed lost with her entire crew of 97 in the Gilbert Islands area. She was stricken from the Navy list on 30 April 1944.

== Sources ==
- Hackett, Bob & Kingsepp, Sander. IJN Submarine I-40: Tabular Record of Movement. Retrieved on August 28, 2020.
