= Japanese submarine I-168 =

Imperial Japanese Navy Kadai-class cruiser submarine of the KD6 sub-class

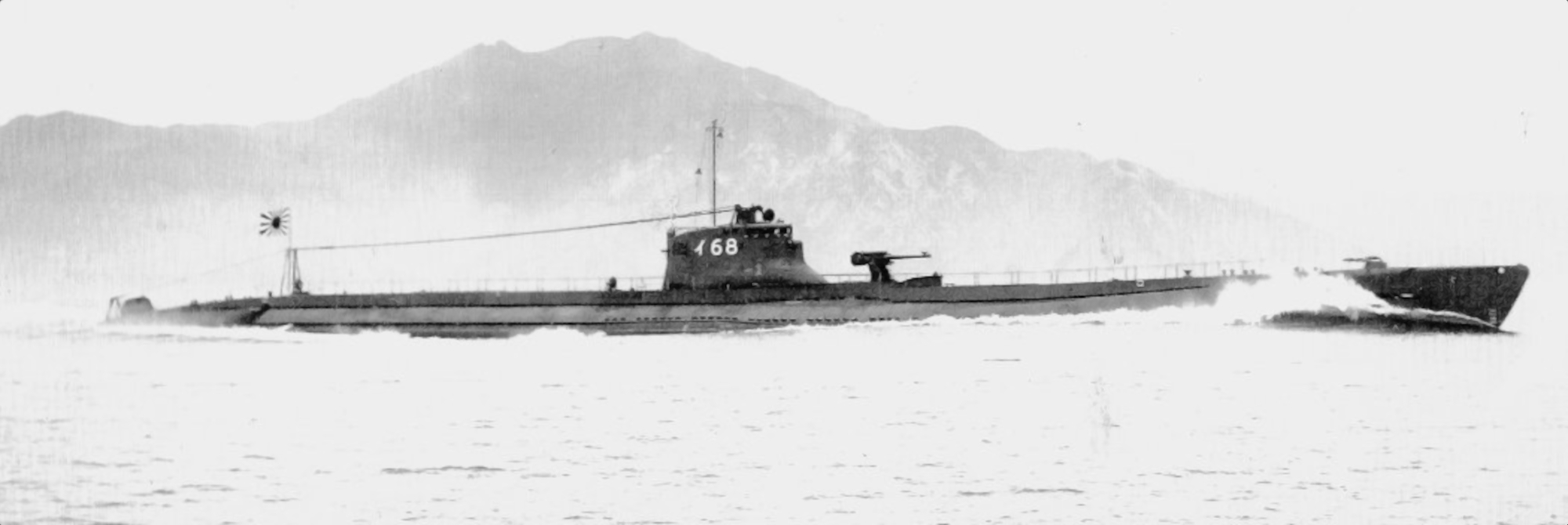
- I-68 in March 1934.

History

Empire of Japan
- Name: I-68
- Builder: Kure Naval Arsenal, Kure, Japan
- Laid down: 18 June 1931
- Launched: 26 June 1933
- Commissioned: 31 July 1934
- Decommissioned: 15 December 1938
- Recommissioned: 1 May 1939
- Decommissioned: 19 October 1940
- Recommissioned: 25 July 1941
- Renamed: I-168 on 20 May 1942
- Fate: Sunk, 27 July 1943
- Stricken: 15 October 1943

General characteristics
- Class & type: KD6 Kaidai-type submarine
- Displacement: 1,400 (1,785 maximum) tons surface, 2,440 tons submerged
- Length: 322 ft 10 in (98.40 m)
- Beam: 26 ft 11 in (8.20 m)
- Draught: 15 ft (4.6 m)
- Propulsion: Twin shaft Kampon 9,000 bhp (6,700 kW) two-stroke diesel engines
- Speed: 23 knots (43 km/h; 26 mph) diesel/8.2 knots (15.2 km/h; 9.4 mph) electric
- Range: 14,000 nmi (26,000 km; 16,000 mi)
- Test depth: 230 ft (70 m)
- Complement: 60–84
- Armament: 6 x torpedo tubes/14 × 21 in (533 mm) torpedoes; 1 x 10 cm/50 Type 88 naval gun; 1 × 13.2 mm (0.52 in) AA gun

I-68, later renumbered I-168, was an Imperial Japanese Navy Kaidai–type cruiser submarine of the KD6 sub-class commissioned in 1934. She served in World War II, operating in support of the Japanese attack on Pearl Harbor and taking part in the Battle of Midway, the Guadalcanal campaign, and the Aleutian Islands campaign before she was sunk in 1943. She is best known for her achievements during the Battle of Midway when, under the command of Lieutenant Commander Yahachi Tanabe, she sank the only United States Navy warships lost in the battle: the already badly damaged aircraft carrier USS Yorktown and the destroyer USS Hammann.

== Construction and commissioning ==
Built by the Kure Naval Arsenal at Kure, Japan, I-68 was laid down on 18 June 1931 and launched on 26 June 1933. She was completed and commissioned on 31 July 1934.

== Service history ==
=== 1934–1941 ===
Upon commissioning, I-68 was attached to the Kure Naval District. When Submarine Division 12, previously deactivated in 1929, was reactivated on 8 October 1934 and subordinated to the Kure Naval District, I-68 and her sister ship I-69 were assigned to the division.

Submarine Division 12 was assigned to Submarine Squadron 2 in the 2nd Fleet, a component of the Combined Fleet, on 15 November 1935. On 13 April 1936, I-68 got underway from Fukuoka, Japan, in company with the other two submarines of her division — I-69 and I-70 — for a training cruise off China in the Qingdao area, which the submarines completed with their arrival at Sasebo, Japan, on 22 April 1936. The three submarines departed Mako in the Pescadores Islands on 4 August 1936 for a training cruise in the Amoy area off China, returning to Mako on 6 September 1936. Submarine Division 12 was placed in the Third Reserve in the Kure Naval District on 15 December 1938, then was attached directly to the Kure Naval District on 1 May 1939.

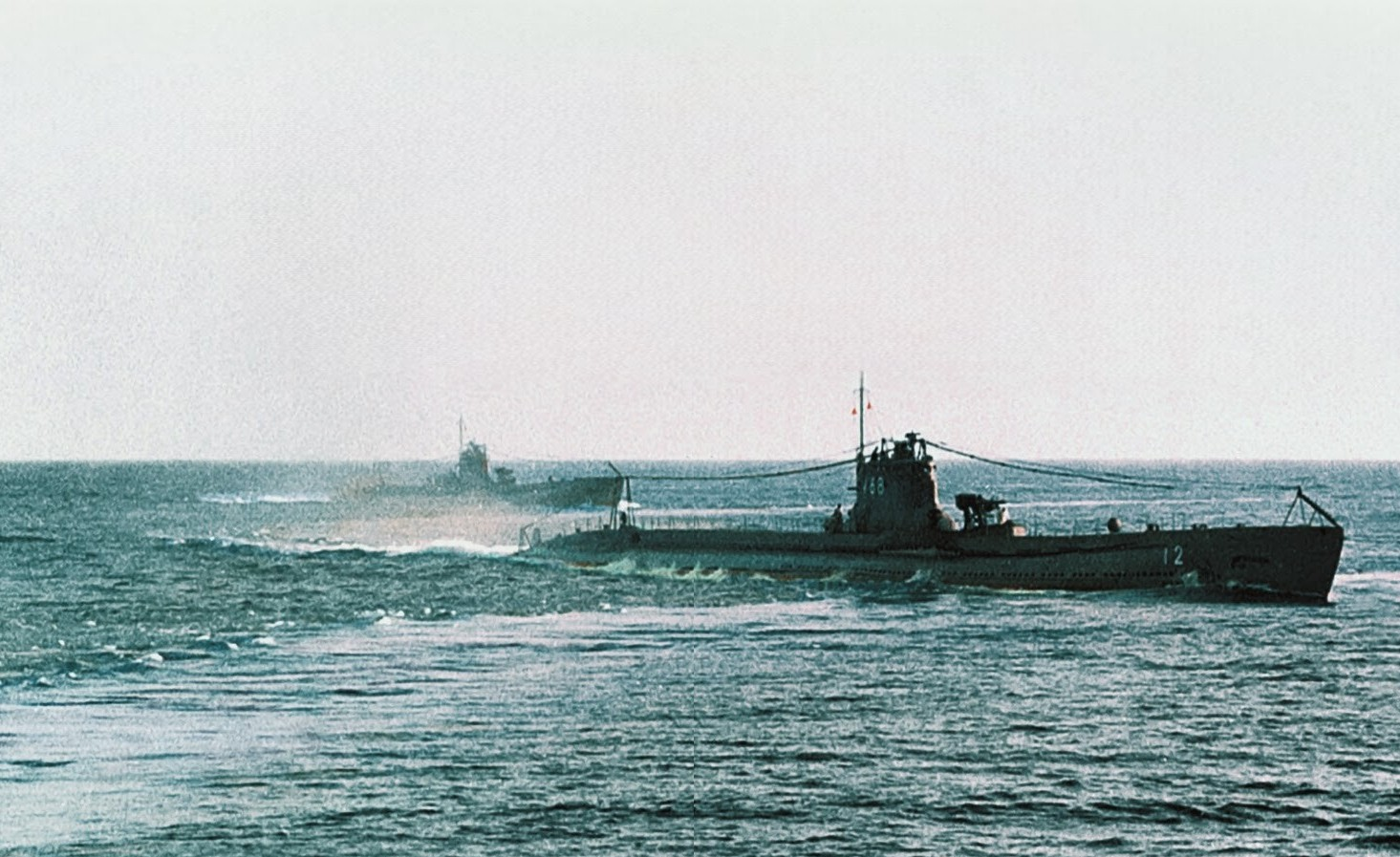
I-168 and I-169 underway in 1936

Submarine Division 12 was reassigned to Submarine Squadron 3 in the 2nd Fleet on 15 November 1939. I-68 departed Okinawa on 27 March 1940 in company with I-69, I-70, and the submarines I-73, I-74, and I-75 for a training cruise in southern Chinese waters, completing it when the six submarines arrived at Takao, Formosa, on 2 April 1940. On 11 October 1940, I-68 was one of 98 Imperial Japanese Navy ships that gathered along with more than 500 aircraft on the Japanese coast at Yokohama Bay for an Imperial fleet review — the largest fleet review in Japanese history — in honor of the 2,600th anniversary of the enthronement of the Emperor Jimmu, Japan's legendary first emperor.

I-68 was decommissioned and placed in reserve on 19 October 1940. While she was inactive, Submarine Squadron 3 was reassigned to the 6th Fleet on 15 November 1940. She returned to active service on 25 July 1941.

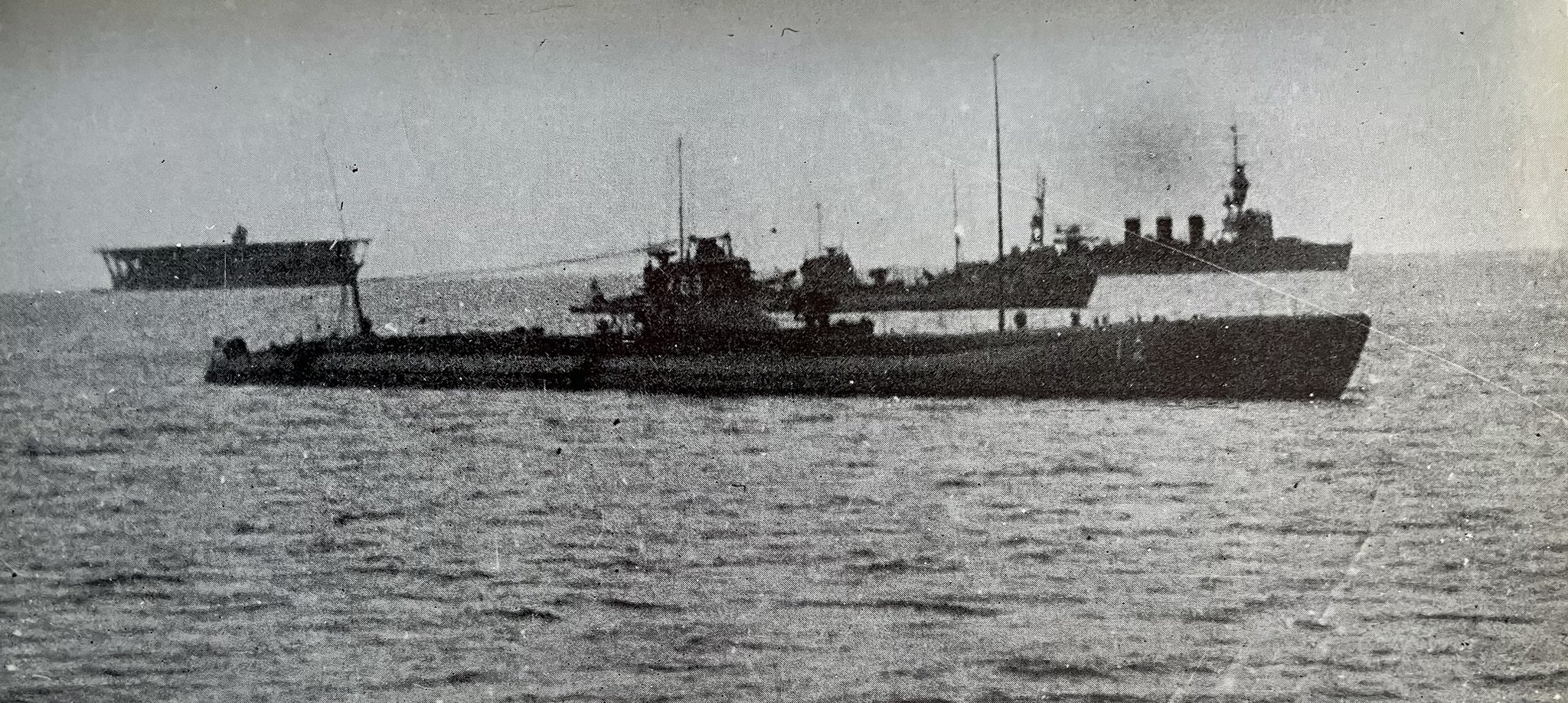
I-168 anchored in Ariake Bay, March of 1936. I-169, the light cruiser Kinu, and the aircraft carrier Kaga are seen behind her

By 11 November 1941, Submarine Squadron 3 had been assigned to the 6th Fleet's Advance Force. That day, the 6th Fleet's commander, Vice Admiral Mitsumi Shimizu, held a meeting with the commanding officers of the submarines of the squadron aboard his flagship, the light cruiser Katori, and his chief of staff briefed them on plans for Operation Z, the upcoming surprise attack on Pearl Harbor in Hawaii. The attack would begin the Pacific campaign and bring Japan and the United States into World War II.

As Japanese military forces began to deploy for the opening Japanese offensive of the war, I-68 departed Saeki Bay on the coast of Kyushu on 11 November 1941 in company with the submarines I-8, I-69, I-70, I-71, I-72, and I-73 bound for Kwajalein Atoll, which she reached on 20 November 1941. Assigned to support Operation Z, I-68 got underway from Kwajalein on 23 November 1941 and set course for the Hawaiian Islands. While she was en route, she received the message "Climb Mount Niitaka 1208" (Japanese: Niitakayama nobore 1208) from the Combined Fleet on 2 December 1941, indicating that war with the Allies would commence on 8 December 1941 Japan time, which was on 7 December 1941 on the other side of the International Date Line in Hawaii.

=== World War II ===
==== First war patrol: Attack on Pearl Harbor ====
By the day of the attack, 7 December 1941, I-68 and the other submarines of Submarine Squadron 3 were on station 25 to 50 nautical miles (46 to 93 km; 29 to 58 mi) south of Oahu with orders to attack any ships attempting to sortie from Pearl Harbor. On 8 December, I-68 and I-69 received orders to lay off Pearl Harbor and rescue midget submarine crews who had participated in the attack, but none of the midget submarines returned, and I-68 soon returned to her patrol area. Over the course of several days beginning on 13 December 1941, I-68 was subjected to 21 separate depth-charge attacks, the last attack of which damaged many of her battery cells and flooded her aft torpedo tubes. Her commanding officer, Lieutenant Commander Otoji Nakamura, decided to terminate her patrol and make for Kwajalein, which she reached on 28 December 1941.

==== January–May 1942 ====
After undergoing initial repairs at Kwajalein, I-68 got back underway on 31 December 1941 and proceeded to Kure, Japan, arriving there on 9 January 1942 for further repair work. During her stay at Kure, Nakamura boarded the flagship of the Combined Fleet, the battleship Yamato, on 17 January 1942 and briefed the commander-in-chief of the Combined Fleet, Admiral Isoroku Yamamoto, and his staff on the depth-charge attacks the U.S. Navy had made against I-68 in Hawaiian waters. On 31 January 1942, Lieutenant Commander Yahachi Tanabe took command of I-68, and on 20 May 1942 she was renumbered I-168.

==== Second war patrol: Battle of Midway ====
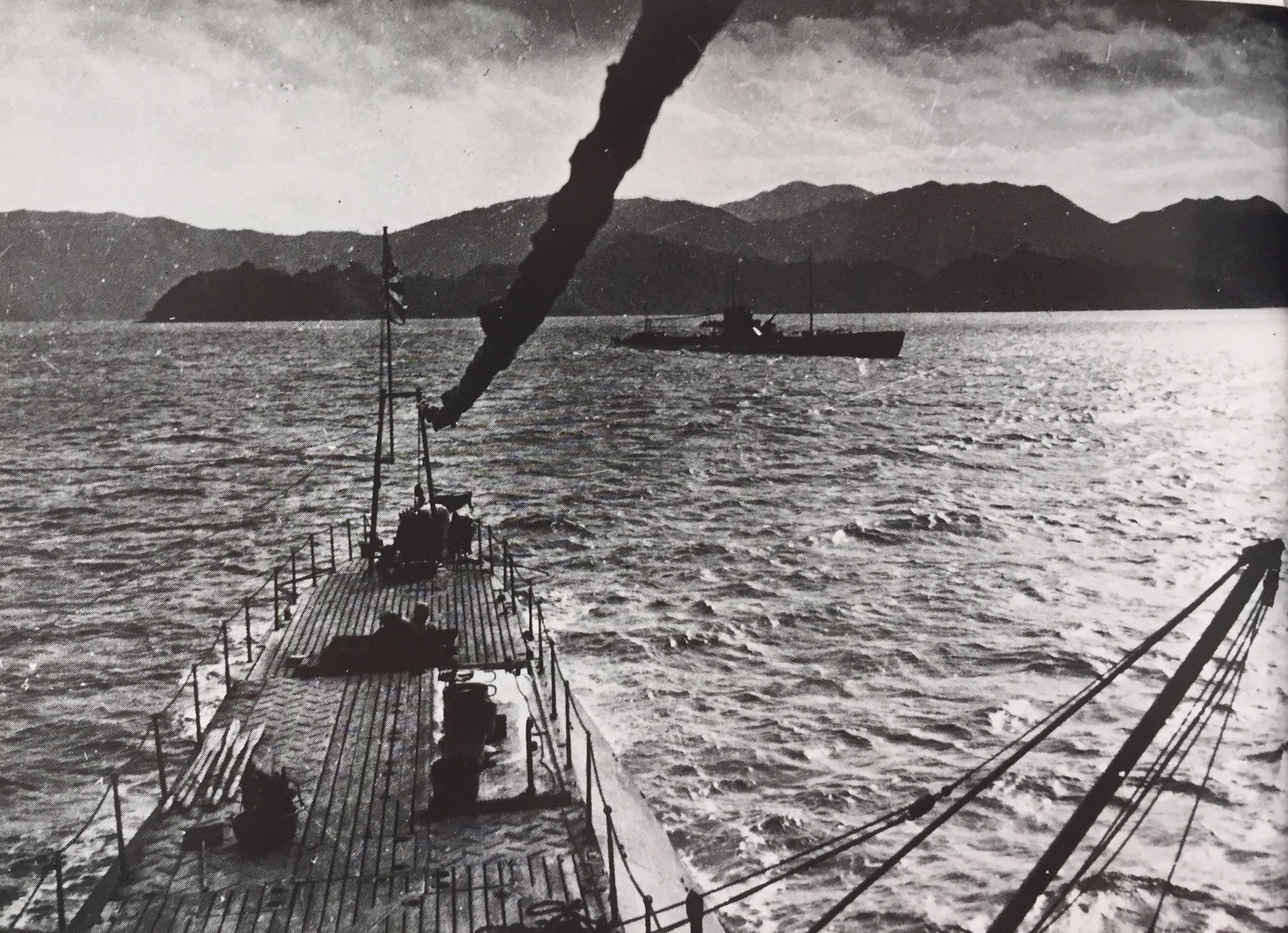
I-168 seen from the deck of the submarine I-70, 21 January 1938

Assigned to support Operation MI, the planned Japanese invasion of Midway Atoll in the Northwestern Hawaiian Islands, I-168 was one of 13 submarines that formed the Advance Expeditionary Force. With her repairs completed, she departed Kure, Japan, under Tanabe's command on 23 May 1942 and headed for Kure Atoll, 48 nautical miles (89 km; 55 mi) west-northwest of Midway, which she reconnoitered on 31 May 1942. On either 1 or 2 June 1942, according to different sources, she arrived off the northwest coast of Midway itself and spent three days observing Midway on the southern horizon through her periscope by day and through binoculars at a range of five nautical miles (9.3 km; 5.8 mi) at night, reporting "unusually frequent patrol aircraft launches," an indication the forces on the atoll had been alerted to the impending Japanese attack. She made her first periscope reconnaissance of Midway's Sand Island on 2 June, and on 3 and 4 June she circumnavigated Midway, providing weather reports to Combined Fleet headquarters.

The American aircraft carriers deploying to oppose the Japanese invasion had passed through the area of the Japanese submarine patrol line before the submarines of the Advance Expeditionary Force arrived on their patrol stations, and — other than I-168, with her vantage point off Midway — none of them made contact with American forces before the Battle of Midway began on 4 June 1942, when aircraft from the Japanese aircraft carriers Akagi, Kaga, Hiryū, and Sōryū attacked Midway. I-168 observed the Japanese airstrike from her patrol station off the atoll. Later in the morning, U.S. Navy carrier aircraft inflicted fatal damage on Akagi, Kaga, and Sōryū, but Hiryū avoided damage and launched a strike which crippled the American aircraft carrier USS Yorktown. U.S. carrier aircraft subsequently inflicted fatal damage on Hiryū as well. Yamamoto ordered I-168 to bombard the airfield on Midway's Eastern Island until the heavy cruisers Mogami, Mikuma, Kumano, and Suzuya could take over the bombardment from her at 01:00 on 5 June 1942, and then to remain off Eastern Island and report U.S. air activity at Midway subsequent to the bombardment. I-168 surfaced 4,500 yards (4,100 m) off the eastern tip of Eastern Island at around 21:54 on 4 June and proceeded on the surface to Sand Island. At 01:24 on 5 June 1942, she opened fire from a point 1,100 yards (1,000 m) southwest of Midway. She fired six rounds from her 100-millimeter (3.9 in) deck gun, inflicting no damage, before United States Marine Corps searchlights and coastal artillery fire forced her to submerge. The Japanese cancelled the heavy cruiser bombardment that was to have followed.

On the morning of 5 June 1942, Japanese floatplanes from the heavy cruiser Chikuma sighted the crippled Yorktown 150 nautical miles (280 km; 170 mi) north-northeast of Midway. Sources disagree on the subsequent sequence of events: One claims that a U.S. Navy PBY Catalina flying boat attacked I-168 while she was on the surface that day, forcing her to submerge, and that she received orders to intercept and sink Yorktown after resurfacing, but another claims that she already was on her way to intercept Yorktown when the PBY attacked her. Either way, she avoided damage during the aircraft's attack and proceeded toward Yorktown′s reported position.

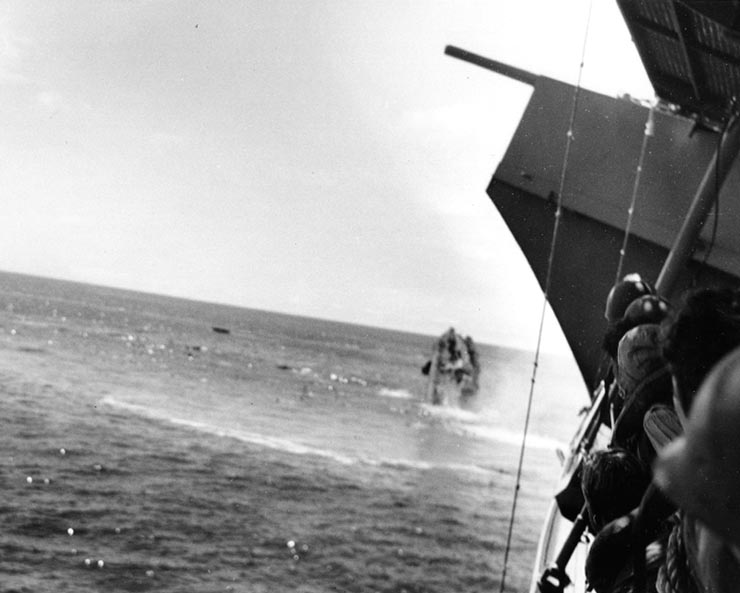
Crew aboard USS Yorktown watch USS Hammann sinking. Both ships were sunk by I-168.

I-168′s lookouts sighted Yorktown at a distance of 12 nautical miles (22 km; 14 mi) at 04:10 on 6 June 1942. She closed the range from a distance of 11 nautical miles (20 km; 13 mi) at 6 knots (11 km/h; 6.9 mph), and at 05:30 sighted the destroyer USS Hammann tied up along Yorktown′s starboard side to provide firefighting and salvage assistance to the carrier, which was under tow by the fleet tug USS Vireo. I-168 sighted destroyers circling 1 nautical mile (1.9 km; 1.2 mi) away at 06:00 and submerged, slowing to 3 knots (5.6 km/h; 3.5 mph) for the final approach through Yorktown's destroyer screen. I-168 remained undetected, but overly cautious use of her periscope resulted in I-168 getting too close to Yorktown on the initial approach, so the submarine circled to starboard to increase the range and then fired a salvo of four torpedoes — two followed three seconds later by two more — either at 13:30 from a range of 1,200 yards (1,100 m) or at 13:31 from range of 1,900 yards (1,700 m), according to different sources. The first torpedo struck Hammann, which sank four minutes later, 81 members of her crew of 241 dying as they struggled in the water when her depth charges exploded after she sank. At 13:32 the second and third torpedoes struck Yorktown on her starboard side below her bridge, and the fourth torpedo missed astern.

After observing the torpedo hits, I-168 descended to 200 feet (61 m) and slowed to 3 knots (5.6 km/h; 3.5 mph) directly under Yorktown. American destroyers began a counterattack at 13:36, when a destroyer passed directly over I-168 and dropped two depth charges. The destroyers USS Gwin, USS Hughes, and USS Monaghan dropped what I-168's crew believed to be 60 depth charges before damaging I-168 at 15:30. A depth charge exploding near the bow put out the lights, causing I-168′s emergency lighting to come on; sprung both the outer and inner hatches of No. 1 torpedo tube, causing flooding in the forward torpedo room and maneuvering room; damaged the forward battery room; and reduced I-168′s depth to 60 feet (18 m). Extensive damage to I-168′s battery cells prompted her crew to put on gas masks because of the danger of chlorine gas poisoning, and all unoccupied crewmen grabbed sacks of rice from forward storage and moved them astern to trim the submarine because of the flooding forward.

With her batteries nearly exhausted, I-168 surfaced at 16:40, an hour before sunset, intending to fight it out on the surface if necessary. She sighted Gwin, Hughes, and Monaghan about 5 nautical miles (9.3 km; 5.8 mi) away but they did not detect her, so she ran west on the surface at 14 knots (26 km/h; 16 mph), the best speed she could make, to charge batteries and ventilate her interior spaces. Tanabe transmitted a report to Combined Fleet headquarters claiming to have sunk Yorktown. According to one source, two American destroyers spotted I-168 at a range of 11,000 yards (10,000 m), and commenced firing at her from a range of 6,500 yards (5,900 m) about 30 minutes after sighting her; another source states that a single destroyer engaged her, closing to a range of 5,470 yards (5,000 m) and firing at her intermittently. After her crew completed emergency repairs to one of her electric motors, I-168 submerged and evaded the approaching destroyers. She surfaced again at 20:00, having survived attacks with 40 depth charges over the course of 13 hours.

After conducting emergency repairs, I-168 limped back to Japan using only two engines, a journey of twelve days. Almost out of fuel, she arrived at Yokosuka, Japan, on 19 June 1942. After refueling, she proceeded to Kure, Japan, which she reached the same day. At Kure, a large crowd greeted her, music was played, and dignitaries made speeches. I-168 moved from Kure to Sasebo on 25 or 26 June 1942, according to different sources, and began repairs there.

I-168's 6 June report of having sunk Yorktown was premature, but Yorktown eventually rolled over and sank in 16,650 feet (5,075 m) of water on the morning of 7 June 1942. One of only two Japanese submarines to make contact with enemy forces during the Battle of Midway and the only one to inflict damage, (Note: The only other Japanese submarine to make contact with enemy forces during the Battle of Midway was I-156, which sighted the U.S. Navy oiler USS Guadalupe escorted by two destroyers 550 nautical miles (1,020 km; 630 mi) east of Midway on 5 June 1942 but could not get into a firing position. See combinedfleet.com I-156.) I-168 sank the only two ships the U.S. Navy lost during the battle, and at the time Yorktown was the largest ship sunk by a submarine during the Pacific campaign of World War II. This would be surpassed by the sinking of the IJN Carrier Shinano by USS Archerfish on 29 November 1944.

=== Guadalcanal campaign ===
During I-168's stay at Sasebo, the Guadalcanal campaign began on 7 August 1942 with United States Marine Corps landings on Guadalcanal in the southeastern Solomon Islands. With her repairs complete, I-168 departed Sasebo on 31 August 1942 and proceeded to the Japanese base at Truk Atoll in the Caroline Islands to support Japanese forces in the campaign. Sources do not describe her activities over the next two months, but she arrived at Kure, Japan, on 18 November 1942 and was drydocked there for repairs.

After completion of her repairs, I-168 got underway from Kure on 15 December 1942 and made for Truk, which she reached on 22 December 1942. She then moved to the Japanese anchorage in the Shortland Islands, from which she departed carrying 15 tons of cargo for Japanese forces on Guadalcanal. She arrived at Guadalcanal on 1 January 1943 and unloaded 60 percent of her cargo before two Allied patrol boats forced her to withdraw and head back to the Shortlands. She made an overnight stop at the Shortlands anchorage on 3–4 January 1943, called at Truk from 7 to 8 January, and then proceeded to Kure, Japan, where she arrived on 14 January 1943 to undergo repairs.

=== Aleutian Islands campaign ===
While I-168 was at Kure, she was assigned to the Northern District Force to support Japanese forces on Attu and Kiska in the Aleutian Islands during the Aleutian Islands campaign. She got underway from Kure on 22 February 1943, called at Yokosuka from 25 February to 5 March 1943, and then proceeded to Paramushiro in the northern Kuril Islands, which she reached on 10 March 1943.

On 13 March 1943, I-168 departed Paramushiro on her first Aleutians supply run, carrying ammunition bound for Attu and Kiska. She arrived at Holtz Bay on the northeast coast of Attu on 15 March, unloaded part of her cargo, and then got back underway to proceed to Kiska. She was on the surface off the entrance to Holtz Bay at 17:27 Yankee Time when the U.S. submarine USS S-32, which misidentified her as an "I-1-class" submarine, fired three torpedoes at her at 52°54′N 173°13′E. S-32's crew heard a muffled explosion and her sound operator reported that I-168′s propeller noises stopped, but in fact all three torpedoes missed, and S-32's commanding officer continued to observe I-168 until 17:36, when he lost sight of her. Many accounts incorrectly identified S-32's target as the submarine Ro-103, which was operating thousands of miles to the south in the Rabaul area at the time.

I-168 arrived at Kiska on 17 March 1943 and discharged the rest of her cargo of ammunition, as well as 6 tons of provisions. She then put back to sea to conduct a war patrol south of Amchitka. The patrol was uneventful, and on 1 April 1943 I-168 returned to Kiska. She embarked sick personnel of the Kiska garrison and the ground personnel of the 452nd Naval Air Group and then headed for Paramushiro, where she arrived on 4 April 1943.

I-168 got back underway from Paramushiro on 10 April 1943 to carry ammunition and mail to Attu and Kiska. She stopped at Attu on 12 April to unload cargo, then put back to sea. She again called at Attu from 14 to 16 April 1943 and embarked several staff officers before heading for Kiska, which she reached on 19 April 1943. After unloading her cargo, she headed for Japan, and arrived at Yokosuka on 9 May 1943. She resumed her assignment to Submarine Squadron 3 that day.

=== May–July 1943 ===
I-168 underwent repairs at Yokosuka. After their completion, she departed Kure on 12 July 1943, called at Truk from 22 to 25 July, and then put back to sea and set course for Rabaul on New Britain in the Bismarck Archipelago. At dusk on 27 July 1943, she transmitted a routine report from the Isabel Strait. The Japanese never heard from her again.

=== Loss ===
As dusk fell on 27 July 1943, I-168 sighted the U.S. submarine USS Scamp on the surface in the Steffen Strait near New Hanover Island and fired a torpedo at Scamp. Scamp sighted the incoming torpedo, went ahead full, and crash-dived, submerging to 220 feet (67 m). After the Japanese torpedo passed overhead, Scamp rose to periscope depth and sighted I-168 on the surface. Scamp fired four torpedoes at I-168 at 18:12, sinking her in the Bismarck Sea 60 nautical miles (110 km; 69 mi) off New Hanover Island at 02°50′S 149°01′E with the loss of all 97 men on board.

On 10 September 1943, the Imperial Japanese Navy declared I-168 to be presumed lost with all hands in the area of north of Rabaul. The Japanese removed her from the navy list on 15 October 1943.
