= TCG İskenderun =

TCG İskenderun is the name of the following ships of the Turkish Navy:

- TCG İskenderun (D 343), ex-USS Boyd, a Fletcher-class destroyer acquired in 1969, stricken in 1981
- TCG İskenderun (A 1600), a troopship commissioned in 2002

== See also ==
- İskenderun
