= Japanese submarine I-169 =

Japanese Kaidai-class submarine

History

Empire of Japan
- Name: I-69
- Builder: Mitsubishi Kobe Yard, Kobe, Japan
- Laid down: 22 December 1931
- Launched: 15 February 1934
- Completed: 28 September 1935
- Commissioned: 28 September 1935
- Decommissioned: 15 December 1938
- Recommissioned: 1 September 1939
- Renamed: I-169, 20 May 1942
- Fate: Sank 4 April 1944
- Stricken: 10 June 1944

General characteristics
- Class & type: KD6 Type, Kadai type submarine
- Displacement: 1,400 (1,785 maximum) tons surfaced; 2,440 tons submerged
- Length: 322 ft 10 in (98.4 m)
- Beam: 26 ft 11 in (8.2 m)
- Draught: 15 ft 0 in (4.6 m)
- Propulsion: Twin shaft Kampon 9,000 bhp (6,711 kW)/two stroke diesels
- Speed: 23 knots (43 km/h; 26 mph) diesel; 8.2 knots (15.2 km/h; 9.4 mph) electric
- Range: 14,000 nmi (26,000 km; 16,000 mi)
- Test depth: 230 ft (70 m)
- Complement: 60–84 officers and enlisted
- Armament: 6 x torpedo tubes/14 21 in (533 mm) torpedoes; 1 x 100 mm (3.9 in) AA gun; 1 × 13.2 mm (0.52 in) AA gun

I-69, later I-169, was an Imperial Japanese Navy Kaidai-class cruiser submarine of the KD6 sub-class commissioned in 1935. She served in World War II, during which she conducted six war patrols and took part in operations supporting the attack on Pearl Harbor, the Battle of Midway, the Guadalcanal campaign, the Aleutians campaign, and the defense of the Gilbert Islands. She sank in a diving accident in April 1944.

== Construction and commissioning ==
Built by Mitsubishi at Kobe, Japan, I-69 was laid down on 22 December 1931 and launched on 15 February 1934. She was completed and accepted into Imperial Japanese Navy service on 28 September 1935.

== Service history ==
=== Pre-World War II ===
Upon commissioning, I-69 was attached to the Kure Naval District. On 8 October 1935, she was assigned to Submarine Division 12. Her division was assigned to Submarine Squadron 2 in the 2nd Fleet, a component of the Combined Fleet, on 15 November 1935. On 13 April 1936, she got underway from Fukuoka, Japan, in company with the other two submarines of her division — I-68 and I-70 — for a training cruise off China in the Qingdao area, which the submarines completed with their arrival at Sasebo on 22 April 1936. The three submarines departed Mako in the Pescadores Islands on 4 August 1936 for a training cruise in the Amoy area off China, returning to Mako on 6 September 1936.

I-69 was decommissioned and placed in the Third Reserve in the Kure Naval District on 15 December 1938, then attached directly to the Kure Naval District on 1 May 1939 while out of commission. She was recommissioned on or about 1 September 1939. Submarine Division 12 was reassigned to Submarine Squadron 3 in the 2nd Fleet on 15 November 1939.

I-69 departed Okinawa on 27 March 1940 in company with I-68, I-70, and the submarines I-73, I-74, and I-75 for a training cruise in Chinese waters, completing it when the six submarines arrived at Takao, Formosa, on 2 April 1940. Submarine Squadron 3 was reassigned to the 6th Fleet on 15 November 1940. On 12 May 1941, I-69 suffered bow damage in a collision with I-70 at Yokosuka, Japan.

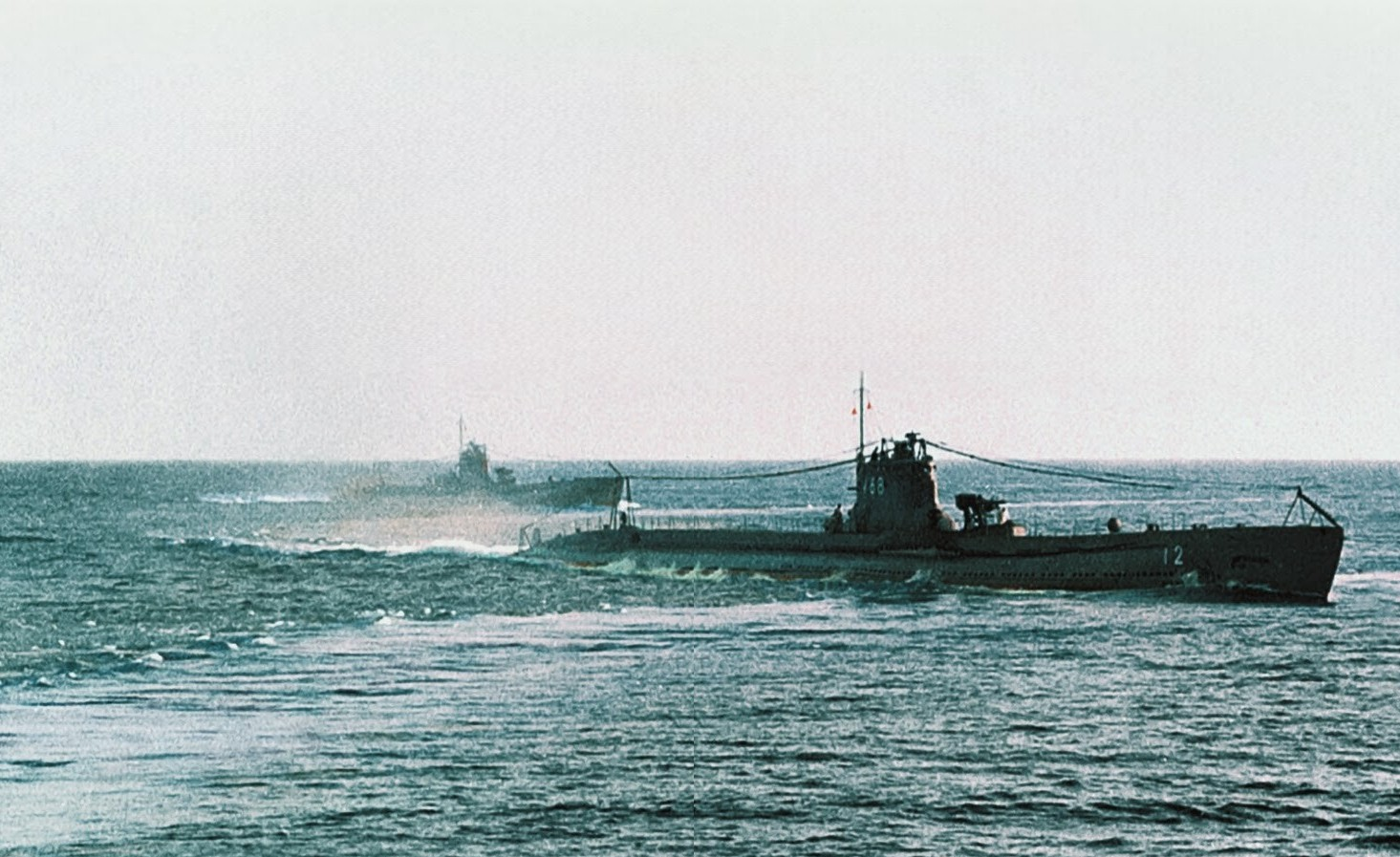
I-169 (left) and I-168 underway in 1936

As the Imperial Japanese Navy began to deploy in preparation for the impending conflict in the Pacific, I-69 was assigned to Operation Z, the planned Japanese attack on Pearl Harbor. Submarine Division 12, consisting of I-69 and I-70, was assigned to Submarine Squadron 3, which in turn was assigned to the 6th Fleet′s Advanced Expeditionary Force, for the attack. On 11 November 1941, I-69 departed Saeki, Japan, with the commander of Submarine Division 12 embarked, bound for Kwajalein in company with I-68, I-70, I-71, I-72, and I-73.

=== World War II ===
==== First war patrol ====
On 23 November 1941, I-69 departed Kwajalein to begin what would become her first war patrol. She received the message "Climb Mount Niitaka 1208" (Japanese: Niitakayama nobore 1208) from the Combined Fleet on 2 December 1941, indicating that war with the Allies would commence on 8 December 1941 Japan time (7 December 1941 in Hawaii).

On 7 December 1941, I-69 and I-68 took up station off the entrance to Pearl Harbor, Hawaii, to rescue the crews of midget submarines attempting to penetrate the harbor's defenses during the Japanese attack that brought Japan and the United States into World War II that morning. At 21:01, I-69′s commanding officer witnessed what he reported as "a massive explosion in Pearl Harbor. There are several explosions, followed by high columns of fire (probably a detonating warship magazine). This must have been some capital ship sunk by our midget submarines". On the evening of 7 December 1941, I-69 fired a torpedo at a destroyer south-southeast of Barbers Point, Oahu. Apparently sighting the torpedo's wake, the destroyer turned away, avoiding the torpedo, then counterattacked with depth charges.

I-69 and I-68 spent 8 December 1941 off the entrance of Pearl Harbor awaiting the return of midget submarine crews, but none returned. On 9 December 1941, I-69 attacked a cargo ship south of Oahu without success and again was depth-charged. Later that day, she became entangled in an anti-submarine net off Barbers Point. After several hours, she freed herself, damaging a periscope in the process, and finally surfaced after remaining submerged for about 39 hours. When all hope of rescuing aircrews shot down during the 7 December attack was abandoned, she left Hawaiian waters, arriving at Kwajalein on 27 December 1941.

==== Second war patrol ====
On 12 January 1942, I-69 departed Kwajalein to begin her second war patrol, assigned to the waters around Midway Atoll in the Northwestern Hawaiian Islands and with orders to conduct a reconnaissance of the atoll. She arrived off Midway on 21 January 1942. At around 18:05 on 8 February 1942, she surfaced less than 1,000 yards (910 m) off Midway's Brooks Channel to bombard the radio station on Sand Island. She fired only three rounds from her 100 mm (3.9 in) gun before return fire by a United States Marine Corps 5-inch (127 mm) coastal artillery battery forced her to submerge. On 10 February 1942, she surfaced south of the mouth of Brooks Channel again at around 17:58 to make a second attempt at bombarding Sand Island, but two U.S. Marine Corps Brewster F2A-3 Buffalo fighters of Marine Fighter Squadron 221 (VMF-221) patrolling overhead spotted her and attacked, each dropping bombs that landed close alongside I-69. The two fighters then strafed I-69 briefly before she submerged after firing only two 100 mm (3.9 in) rounds at the island. She returned to Kwajalein on 17 February 1942.

==== Third and fourth war patrols ====
On 18 February 1942, I-69 departed Kwajalein to begin her third war patrol, ordered to patrol in defense of Rabaul on New Britain, which the U.S. Navy's Task Force 11 was approaching with an intention to launch air raids against Japanese forces and bases there. After Task Force 11 lost the element of surprise, however, it withdrew, and I-69 was diverted to a patrol area east of Wake Island. After an uneventful patrol, she proceeded to Japan, where she arrived on 5 March 1942 for an overhaul at Kure.

With the overhaul complete, I-69 got underway from Kure on 15 April 1942 to begin her fourth war patrol, operating as part of a submarine patrol line in the vicinity of Wake Island. This patrol also was uneventful, and she concluded it with her arrival at Kwajalein on 9 May 1942. During her stay at Kwajalein, she was renumbered I-169 on 20 May 1942.

==== Fifth war patrol — Midway operation ====
On 24 May 1942, I-169 departed Kwajalein for her fifth war patrol, deploying in support of Operation MI, the planned Japanese invasion of Midway Atoll. As part of Submarine Squadron 3, she operated in a patrol line — which also included the submarines I-168, I-171, I-174, and I-175 — in the Pacific Ocean between 20°00′N 166°20′W and 23°30′N 166°20′W, tasked with intercepting American reinforcements approaching Midway from the main Hawaiian Islands to the southeast. During the Battle of Midway, fought from 4 to 7 June 1942, I-169′s squadron mate I-168 torpedoed the aircraft carrier USS Yorktown (CV-5), but the rest of the patrol line had no impact on the battle, and I-169 saw no action during her patrol. The Japanese suffered a decisive defeat and cancelled the invasion of Midway. I-169 concluded her patrol with her arrival at Kwajalein on 20 June 1942.

==== Sixth war patrol ====
On 9 July 1942, I-169 departed Kwajalein on her sixth war patrol with the commander of Submarine Division 12 on board. She had orders to reconnoiter New Caledonia and the New Hebrides during the patrol. During July, she conducted a reconnaissance of New Caledonia's Saint Vincent Bay. On 25 July 1942, when she was 75 nautical miles (139 km; 86 mi) southeast of Nouméa, New Caledonia, she torpedoed the Dutch 9,227-gross register ton cargo ship Tjinegara, serving at the time as a United States Army troopship and on a voyage from Rockhampton, Queensland, Australia, to Nouméa. After several torpedo hits Tjinegara sank at 23°18′S 165°25′E. On 4 and 5 August 1942, I-169 conducted a reconnaissance of Port Vila on Efate in the New Hebrides. She was forced to leave the area when two destroyers chased her. She arrived at Truk, concluding her patrol, on 15 August 1942.

==== August–December 1942 ====
I-169 got underway from Truk on 17 August 1942 to return to Japan. She arrived at Kure on 24 August 1942, then moved to Sasebo on 2 September 1942 to undergo an overhaul. With it complete, she returned to Truk, where she arrived on 18 September 1942 with Submarine Squadron 3's I-8, I-168, I-171, I-172, I-174, and I-175 to participate in the Guadalcanal campaign. On 16 November 1942, the 6th Fleet commander, Vice Admiral Teruhisa Komatsu called a meeting of submarine captains and announced that the commander-in-chief of the Combined Fleet, Admiral Isoroku Yamamoto, had ordered the Japanese submarine force to organize a supply system for the Imperial Japanese Army's 17th Army on Guadalcanal. After taking part in this effort, I-169 returned to Kure on 3 January 1943.

==== Aleutians campaign ====
I-169 spent the first half of 1943 involved in the Aleutian Islands campaign, which had begun in mid-1942. On 15 January 1943, she left Kure to carry supplies to the Japanese garrison on Kiska in the Aleutian Islands. After her return to Kure, she was assigned to the 5th Fleet for the duration of the Aleutians campaign. She departed Kure on 15 February 1943 for another trip to Kiska, this time carrying Japanese soldiers as well as a Type A midget submarine and its torpedoes. She reached Kiska on 26 February 1943, discharged her passengers and cargo, and began her return voyage to Kure on 27 February 1943. During the trip, she sighted a U.S. Navy cruiser escorted by a destroyer on 28 February 1943, and the destroyer mounted a depth-charge attack against her.

After refueling from the oiler Teiyō Maru on 20 and 21 March 1943, I-169 departed Paramushiro in the Kurile Islands on 22 March 1943 to patrol in the Bering Sea in the vicinity of 53°59′N 174°00′E as part of a submarine patrol line. After an uneventful patrol there, she returned to Japan, arriving at Yokosuka for an overhaul on 9 April 1943. During April 1943, she became part of Submarine Squadron 1 — along with the submarines I-2, I-7, I-31, I-34, I-35, I-168 and I-171 — in the 5th Fleet's Northern District Force, and the squadron was tasked with reinforcing and resupplying Japanese garrisons in the Aleutian Islands.

The Battle of Attu began on 11 May 1943 with U.S. landings on Attu Island. On 21 May 1943, with the situation on Attu deteriorating, the Japanese Imperial General Headquarters decided to evacuate the isolated garrison on Kiska. On 24 May 1943, I-169 set out from Yokosuka bound for Kiska with a cargo of 1,440 rifles with ammunition and 2 tons of food. En route, she was ordered to join I-171 and I-175 in forming a scouting line in the vicinity of Attu. On 30 May 1943, combat operations on Attu ended with the annihilation of the Japanese garrison. I-169 conducted a reconnaissance of Kuluk Bay on the northeastern coast of Adak Island on 5 June 1943, and on 9 June 1943 arrived at Kiska and discharged her cargo. Embarking 60 passengers, she departed Kiska on 10 June 1943. She survived an attack by a radar-equipped destroyer that opened fire on her with guns while she was on the surface charging her batteries and arrived safely at Paramushiro on 14 June 1943. On 14–15 June 1943 she took aboard cargo from the auxiliary submarine tender Heian Maru and refueled from Teiyō Maru.

In late June 1943, I-169 set out from Paramushiro again on another supply run to Kiska, refueling from Teiyō Maru on 27 June 1943. She and the submarine I-21 received orders on 17 July 1943 to shell Amchitka Army Airfield at Constantine Harbor on Amchitka, but the order was canceled nine hours later. On 22 July 1943, she made a sound contact on Rear Admiral Robert C. Giffen′s Task Group 16.21. She transmitted a contact report which the submarine I-2 received, but dense fog prevented I-169 from attacking Giffen's ships.

On 28 July 1943, the last Japanese troops were evacuated from Kiska. Allied forces did not detect the evacuation and launched a full-scale invasion of unoccupied Kiska in Operation Cottage on 15 August 1943, but Japanese involvement in the Aleutians campaign had ended with the 28 July evacuation. On 10 August 1943, I-169 arrived at Kure for an overhaul.

==== Operations from Truk ====
With her overhaul complete, I-169 got underway from Kure on 25 September 1943 bound for Truk, which she reached on 3 October 1943. She departed Truk on 14 October 1943 and while at sea was ordered to join the submarines I-19, I-35, and I-175 in attacking a large westbound Allied convoy that the submarine I-36 had sighted south of the Hawaiian Islands.

On 19 November 1943, I-169 was on patrol in the Pacific Ocean between Hawaii and the Marshall Islands when she, I-19, I-35, I-39, and I-175 received orders to proceed to Tarawa Atoll in the Gilbert Islands, where an invasion fleet of some 200 Allied ships was gathering. On 20 November 1943, U.S. forces landed on Tarawa Atoll and Makin Atoll in the Gilberts. In the Battle of Tarawa, the Japanese garrison was destroyed by 23 November, while the Battle of Makin ended with the annihilation of Japanese forces there on 24 November. On 26 November 1943, I-169 received orders to form a picket line with the submarines I-19, I-40, and Ro-38 north of Makin Atoll. While I-169 was running on the surface on 1 December 1943, an American plane detected her, but she was able to dive and escape. While running submerged, she made sound contact on a heavily escorted U.S. convoy but was unable to break through the escort screen and attack. She returned to Truk on 9 December 1943.

While at Truk during December 1943 and January 1944, I-169 took torpedoes and stores aboard from Heian Maru, and on 1 January 1944 she was assigned to the Truk-based Submarine Division 12, a part of Submarine Squadron 3, along with the submarines I-171, I-174, I-175 and I-176. On 27 January 1944 she departed Truk bound for Rabaul, then got underway from Rabaul on a supply mission to Buka and Buin on 27 January 1944. She returned to Truk on 11 March 1944. She left Truk again on 18 March, but returned on 22 March 1944.

==== Loss ====
On 4 April 1944, I-169 was at her anchorage in Truk Lagoon northwest of Dublon, taking on supplies with some workmen aboard and her commanding officer and 20 other members of her crew ashore. At about 09:00 Japan Standard Time, an air raid warning sounded. I-169′s watch officer ordered her to dive immediately to avoid attack by approaching U.S. Navy PB4Y-1 Liberator patrol bombers. She submerged with most of her deck hatches still open and her main induction valve unsecured, causing her after compartments to flood immediately. An immediate attempt to resurface failed, and although surviving crewmen sealed off the flooded compartments, I-169 sank to the bottom in 125 feet (38 m) of water.

After I-169 submerged, it was not immediately apparent that she was in distress. Only after she did not surface after the air raid and attempts to contact her were unsuccessful did concern grow that she had sunk. A diver sent down to investigate found her on the bottom and contacted the surviving crewmen trapped on board by tapping on her hull.

Sixth Fleet headquarters issued orders on 5 April 1944 to rescue the trapped survivors. A repair ship with a 30-ton crane and the tug Futagami arrived on the scene to attempt to lift I-169′s bow to the surface. They initially had difficulty finding I-169, and once they located her and attempted to lift her, the crane's cable broke due to the flooded submarine's great weight.

Tapping later died away except from the aft compartment. Salvage crews lowered air hoses and drilled holes in I-169′s ballast tanks but found it impossible to signal the surviving crewmen to open the air valves to the ballast tanks from the inside. The trapped crewmen fell silent by 23:00 on 5 April 1944 and air raids on Truk prevented further work on the wreck overnight on 5–6 April 1944. All the trapped men who survived the initial flooding suffocated.

== Aftermath ==
At 22:32 on 17 April 1944, U.S. Navy codebreakers intercepted and decrypted a Japanese message that provided a preliminary report on the cause of the loss of I-169. Their decryption of it read: "Interim report about the I-169 incident. 1. The bodies of the Army officers have been recovered and the causes of the accident have been investigated. It is regrettably the case that, as far as can be seen, the hatchway and outboard ---- were closed, but the cover of the engine room was left open. Compressed air was driven thence through the storm ventilator -----. Through some mistake or other the flood - controller there was left open, for that reason ---- [blanks] --- the engine room and after torpedo compartment hatchway was open."

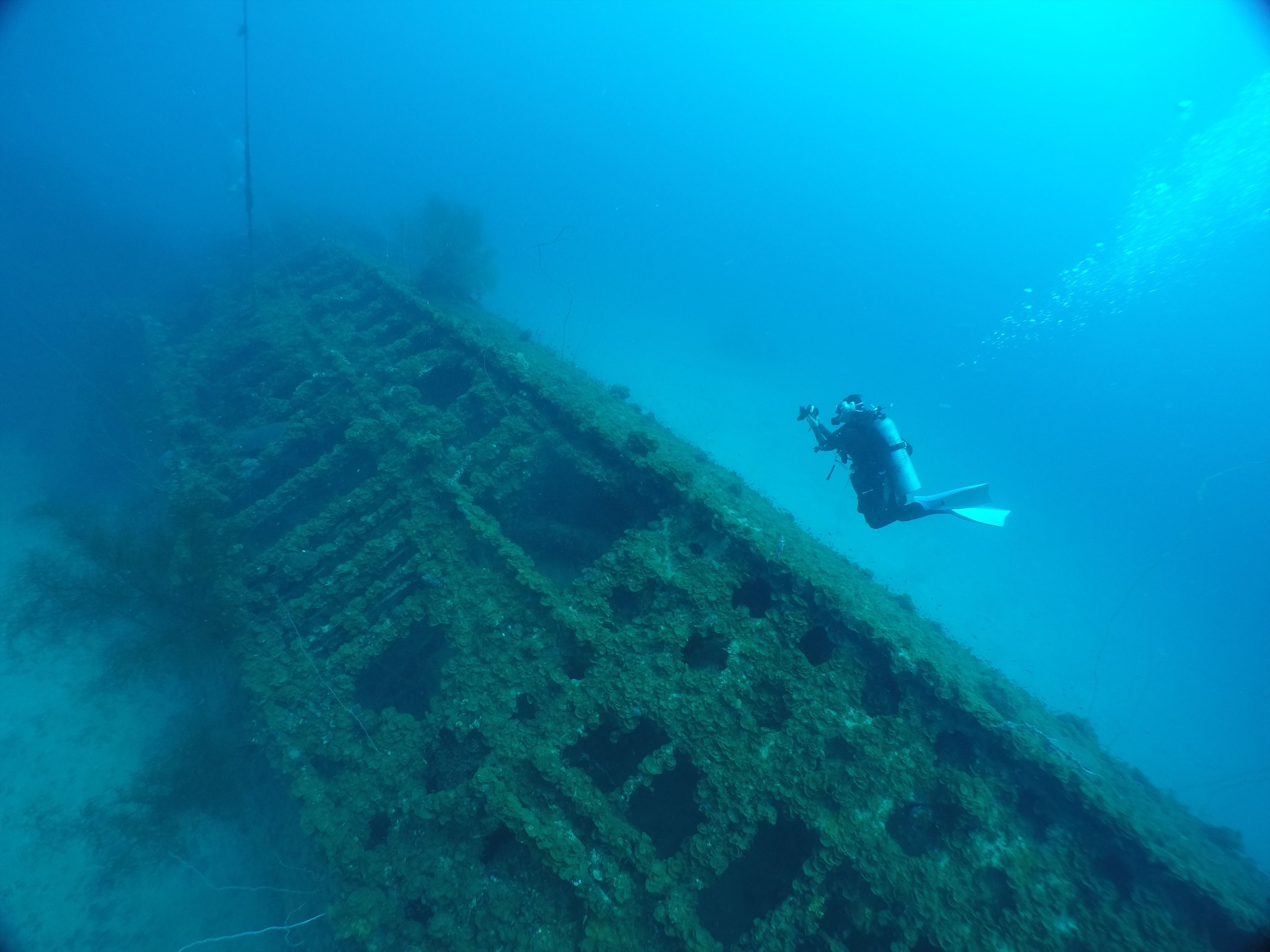
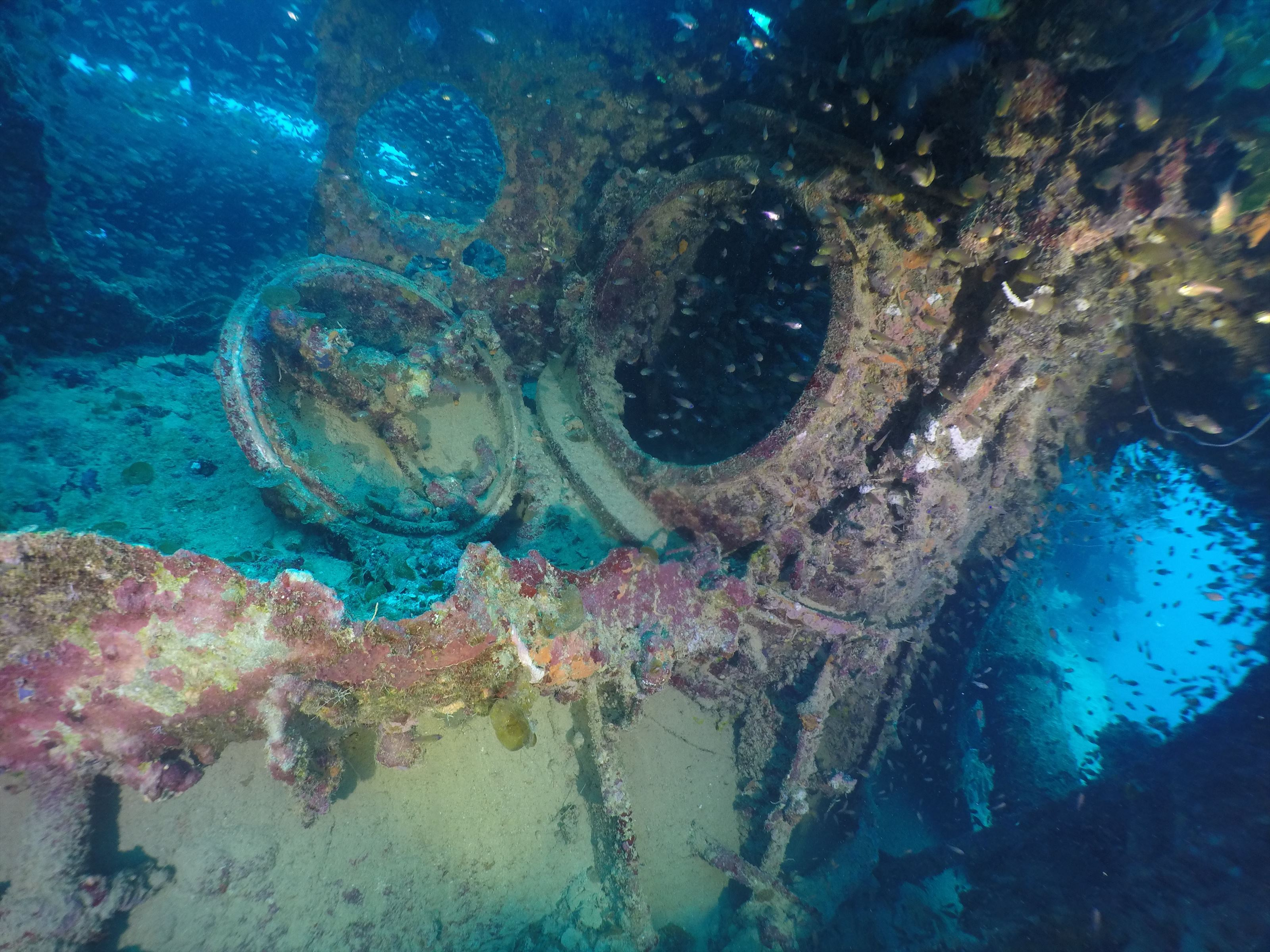
Two views of the wreck of I-169 on 1 December 2015.

Over the weeks following I-169′s loss, divers recovered 32 bodies from her forward compartments. The Japanese began referring to I-169 as "Shinohara," after her commanding officer, Lieutenant Shigeo Shinohara, who was ashore when she sank and therefore survived. In May 1944, the Japanese believed that an invasion of Truk was imminent, and they detonated depth charges around I-169 in an attempt to demolish her before she could fall into enemy hands. The depth charges heavily damaged her bow and conning tower. The Allies chose to bypass Truk, which remained in Japanese hands until the end of World War II.

I-169 was stricken from the Navy list on 10 June 1944.

I-169′s wreck was rediscovered in February 1972, when six divers entered it and filmed its interior. In August 1973, the remains of her crew and their personal effects were returned to Japan. Her crew's remains were cremated there in accordance with Shinto custom.

== Commemoration ==
I-169's ship's bell is on display at the Yasukuni Shrine in Tokyo, Japan.
