= Japanese submarine I-39 =

Type B1 submarine

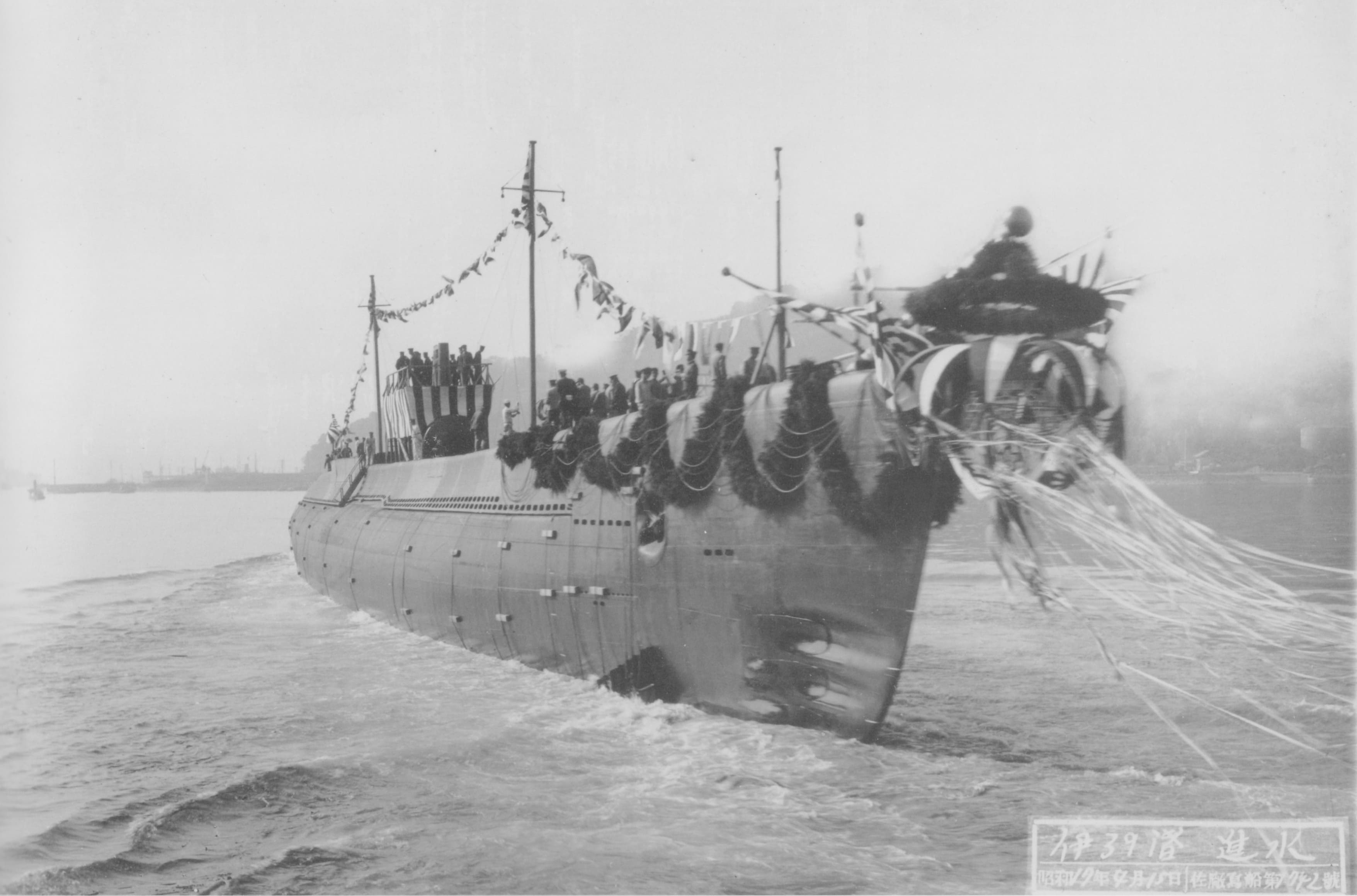
- Launching of I-39, 15 April 1942

History

Japan
- Name: Submarine No. 152
- Builder: Sasebo Naval Arsenal
- Laid down: 19 June 1941
- Renamed: I-39
- Launched: 15 April 1942
- Completed: 22 April 1943
- Commissioned: 22 April 1943
- Fate: Missing after 25 November 1943; Probably sunk 26 November 1943
- Stricken: 30 April 1944

General characteristics
- Class & type: Type B1 submarine
- Displacement: 2,584 tons surfaced; 3,654 tons submerged
- Length: 108.7 m (356 ft 8 in)
- Beam: 9.3 m (30 ft 6 in)
- Draft: 5.14 m (16 ft 10 in)
- Propulsion: 2 diesels: 12,400 hp (9,200 kW); Electric motors: 2,000 hp (1,500 kW)
- Speed: 23.5 knots (43.5 km/h) surfaced; 8 knots (15 km/h) submerged
- Range: 14,000 nautical miles (26,000 km) at 16 knots (30 km/h)
- Test depth: 100 m (330 ft)
- Complement: 94
- Armament: 6 × 533 mm (21 in) forward torpedo tubes; 17 torpedoes; 1 × 14 cm/40 11th Year Type naval gun
- Aircraft carried: 1 Yokosuka E14Y seaplane

I-39 was an Imperial Japanese Navy B1 type submarine. Completed and commissioned in 1943, she served in World War II, operating in support of Japanese forces in the Battle of Tarawa before she was sunk in November 1943.

== Construction and commissioning ==
I-39 was laid down on 19 June 1941 by at the Sasebo Navy Yard at Sasebo, Japan, with the name Submarine No. 152. Renamed I-39 by the time she was launched on 15 April 1942 and provisionally attached to the Yokosuka Naval District that day, she was completed and commissioned on 22 April 1943.

== Service history ==
Upon commissioning, I-39 was attached formally to the Yokosuka Naval District and assigned to Submarine Squadron 11 for work-ups. With those completed, she was reassigned to Submarine Division 14 in Submarine Squadron 8 in the Submarine Advance Force on 20 July 1943. She departed Yokosuka on 21 July 1943 and arrived at Truk on 27 July 1943.

=== First war patrol ===
On 2 August 1943, I-39 set out from Truk on her first war patrol, with a patrol area in the New Hebrides. She was depth-charged briefly by a destroyer north of Espiritu Santo on 7 August 1943, and on 29 August 1943 two destroyers sighted and pursued her, but she suffered no damage in either encounter.

On 2 September 1943, I-39 sighted a convoy of three transports escorted by four destroyers. She fired two torpedoes, both of which exploded close astern of the attack transport USS Fuller, which was carrying the New Zealand Army′s 3rd Division from Port Vila on Efate to Point Cruz on Guadalcanal. A destroyer attempted a counterattack, but failed to locate I-39. On 10 September, I-39 sighted an unescorted transport heading toward Espiritu Santo at 09:50, but could not get within torpedo range of her. On 11 September I-39 sighted another unescorted transport east of Espiritu Santo at 05:05 and two transports escorted by a destroyer at 18:10, but made no attacks.

I-39 was 150 nautical miles (280 km; 170 mi) east of Espiritu Santo on 12 September 1943 when she sighted the United States Navy fleet tug USS Navajo towing the 6,600-ton gasoline barge YOGN-42 from Pago Pago in American Samoa to Espiritu Santo. Mistaking Navajo for a British Leander-class light cruiser, she hit Navajo with a single torpedo amidships on her starboard side. Navajo exploded and sank by the bow in two minutes at 14°58′S 169°17′E with the loss of 17 members of her crew.

While returning to Truk, I-39 suffered damage when she was depth-charged on 25 September 1943. She reached Truk on 27 September 1943 and underwent repairs there.

=== Second war patrol ===
The Gilbert and Marshall Islands campaign began on 20 November 1943 with the U.S. invasion of Tarawa and of Makin in the Gilbert Islands. On 21 November 1943, I-39 received orders to proceed to Tarawa along with the submarines I-19, I-35, I-169, and I-175. With a Yokosuka E14Y1 (Allied reporting name "Glen") floatplane aboard, she got underway from Truk on her second war patrol that day, with an assigned patrol area southwest of Tarawa. She reported on 24 November 1943 that she was approaching her patrol area, and on 25 November — the same day she was reassigned to Submarine Division 2 in Submarine Squadron 1 — she reported that she had arrived in her patrol area. The Japanese never heard from her again.

=== Loss ===
On 26 November 1943, the battleship USS Massachusetts was steaming 80 nautical miles (150 km; 92 mi) southwest of Tarawa as part of Task Group 50.2, when she detected a surface target 9 nautical miles (17 km; 10 mi) to the southwest on radar at 22:52. At 23:02 the destroyer USS Boyd was detached to investigate. She detected a surfaced submarine on radar at 23:20 and closed with it. She lost radar contact, apparently when the submarine submerged, but Boyd then located the submarine with her sonar. She dropped two patterns of depth charges, and heard a loud underwater explosion 15 minutes after the last attack at 00°31′N 172°16′E. On the morning of 27 November 1943, planes from the aircraft carrier USS Enterprise flew over the area and reported a large oil slick on the surface. It marked the end of a Japanese submarine.

The submarine probably was I-39, although it is possible that Boyd sank I-40, which also disappeared in the Tarawa area around the same time. An alternative account claims that the destroyer escort USS Griswold sank I-39 off Koli Point, Guadalcanal, on 23 December 1943, although that location lies outside I-39′s patrol area and the date is four weeks after she last transmitted a message,

On 20 February 1944, the Imperial Japanese Navy declared I-39 to be presumed lost with her entire crew of 96 in the Gilbert Islands area. She was stricken from the Navy list on 30 April 1944.

== Bibliography ==
- Hackett, Bob & Kingsepp, Sander. IJN Submarine I-39: Tabular Record of Movement. Retrieved on August 26, 2020.
- Milanovich, Kathrin (2021). "The IJN Submarines of the I 15 Class". In Jordan, John (ed.). Warship 2021. Oxford, UK: Osprey Publishing. pp. 29–43. ISBN 978-1-4728-4779-9.
