= USS Griswold (DE-7) =

Evarts-class destroyer escort

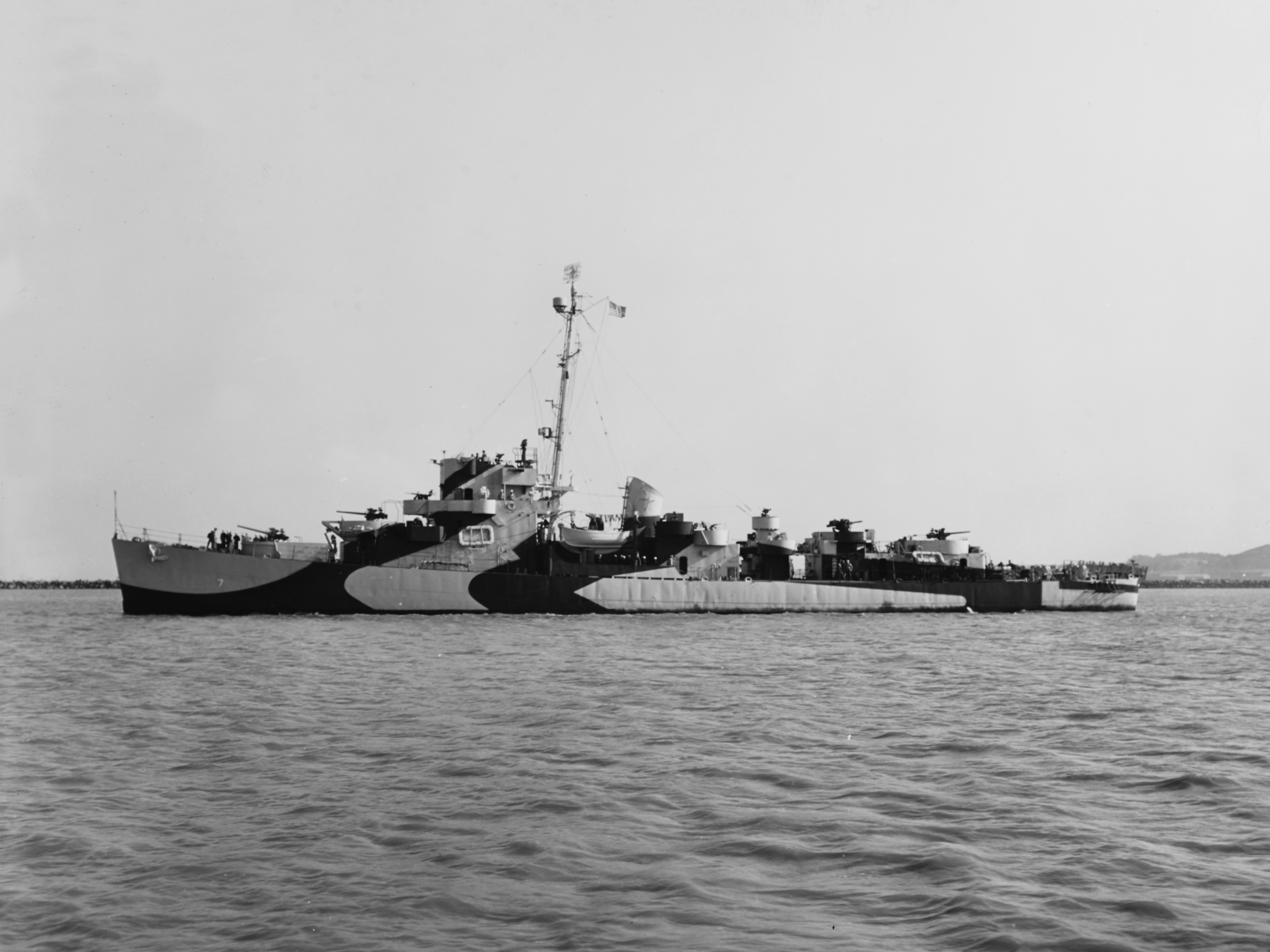
- USS Griswold (DE-7) off the Mare Island Naval Shipyard, on 23 May 1944

History

United States
- Name: Griswold
- Namesake: Ensign Don T. Griswold
- Builder: Boston Navy Yard
- Laid down: 27 November 1942
- Launched: 9 January 1943
- Commissioned: 28 April 1943
- Decommissioned: 19 November 1945
- Stricken: 5 December 1945
- Fate: Sold for scrap, 27 November 1946

General characteristics
- Class & type: Evarts class destroyer escort
- Displacement: 1,140 (std), 1,430 tons (full)
- Length: 289 ft 5 in (88.21 m) (oa), 283 ft 6 in (86.41 m) (wl)
- Beam: 35 ft 2 in (10.72 m)
- Draft: 11 ft 0 in (3.35 m) (max)
- Propulsion: 4 GM Model 16-278A diesel engines with electric drive, 6000 shp, 2 screws
- Speed: 21 knots
- Range: 4,150 nm
- Complement: 15 officers / 183 enlisted
- Armament: 3 × 3 in (76 mm) Mk 22 (1×3), 1 × Hedgehog Projector, Mk 10 (144 rounds), 8 Mk 6 depth charge projectors, 2 Mk 9 depth charge tracks

USS Griswold (DE-7) was an Evarts-class short-hull destroyer escort in the service of the United States Navy, named for Ensign Don T. Griswold, who perished during the Battle of Midway 1942.

== Design ==
The Evarts-class destroyer escorts were 289 ft 5 in (88.21 m) long overall, and they had a beam of 35 ft 2 in (10.72 m). They had an average draft of 10 ft 1 in (3.07 m) at their full load displacement of 1,416 long tons (1,439 t). Each ship had a normal crew numbered 156 officers and sailors.

Griswold was propelled by a pair of diesel motors manufactured by General Motors, which drove a pair of screw propellers. Her propulsion system was rated to produce 6,000 brake horsepower (4,500 kW) for a top speed of 19.5 knots (36.1 km/h; 22.4 mph). Oil storage amounted to between 131 and 197 long tons (133 and 200 t), which allowed a cruising radius of up to 6,000 nautical miles (11,000 km; 6,900 mi) at an economical pace of 10 knots (19 km/h; 12 mph).

The ship's armament consisted of a main battery of three 3-inch (76 mm) /50-caliber guns in individual pivot mounts, which could be used against air or surface targets. These were supported by a light anti-aircraft battery that initially consisted of four 1.1 in (28 mm) /75-caliber guns in a quadruple mount and nine 20 mm (0.79 in) Oerlikon guns. For attacks against submarines, the ship was equipped with a Hedgehog mortar, eight depth charge throwers, and two depth charge racks.

== Service history ==
The new destroyer escort was named for Don Griswold, a naval aviator killed during the Battle of Midway in June 1942. Griswold (DE-7) was launched 9 January 1943, by Boston Naval Shipyard, Charlestown, Massachusetts; sponsored by Mrs. Don T. Griswold, mother of Ensign Don T. Griswold. She was commissioned 28 April 1943.

After shakedown in Bermuda, Griswold headed for the Pacific, reaching Bora Bora, Society Islands, via Norfolk, Virginia and the Panama Canal 23 July 1943. Immediately pressed into service, she escorted convoys through the South Pacific, until April 1944. On 12 September, she conducted a 4-hour attack on a Japanese submarine off Guadalcanal, and although debris and an oil slick rose to the surface, she was not credited with a kill.

Undaunted, Griswold struck again 3 months later and this time recorded a kill. At 2200 on the night of 23 December, patrolling off Lunga Point, Guadalcanal, she was dispatched to investigate a periscope sighting. Alert sonar operators picked up the contact immediately, and held it for the next 5 hours, as the determined ship conducted attack after attack on the elusive Japanese raider. Oil slicks and air bubbles after the sixth and seventh attacks told Griswold that her quarry was hit. This was confirmed shortly before 0300 on 24 December, when a periscope poked up out of the water. Griswold charged in for her eighth attack, laying a lethal pattern of twelve depth charges. A heavy oil slick dotted with debris rose to the surface, and the tenacious ship and crew were credited with sinking I-39.

After overhaul at Mare Island, the escort ship returned to the Pacific theatre on 3 June 1944 to escort convoys and participate in training exercises out of Pearl Harbor well into 1945. From 12 March-6 May 1945, she remained on station at Eniwetok as flagship for Commander Task Group 96.3, under Commander T. F. Fowler. The long Pacific campaign was moving into its final phase that spring as American forces invaded Okinawa, a short step from the Japanese home islands; and Griswold soon moved up to the front.

Reaching Okinawa on 27 May, Griswold immediately took up station on the ASW screen, and was shortly rewarded with two kamikaze kills, 31 May and 5 June. The second of those would-be kamikazes dived on Griswold, but she evaded it and the marauder exploded into the ocean so close that fragments of the Japanese plane showered over her.

On 29 June, Griswold departed Okinawa, escorting a convoy to Leyte Gulf, Philippines, and continuing on to Ulithi for screening work. At war's end, she sailed triumphantly into Japanese waters, anchoring in Tokyo Bay on 10 September. Embarking passengers for stateside, Griswold cleared Tokyo 6 days later and arrived San Pedro, Los Angeles on 8 October via Eniwetok and Pearl Harbor.

She decommissioned there on 19 November 1945, and was struck from the Naval Vessel Register on 5 December. The hulk was sold to Dulien Steel Products, Seattle, Wash., for scrapping on 27 November 1946.

== Awards ==
- Combat Action Ribbon (retroactive)
- American Campaign Medal
- Asiatic-Pacific Campaign Medal (with three service stars)
- World War II Victory Medal
