= Japanese cruiser Suzuya =

Suzuya may refer to one of two cruisers of the Imperial Japanese Navy, named for the Susuya River in Karafuto:

- Japanese cruiser Suzuya (1904), the former Novik captured by Japan during the Russo-Japanese War; scrapped in 1913
- Japanese cruiser Suzuya (1934), a Mogami-class cruiser; sunk by American-carrier-based aircraft in October 1944 during the Battle off Samar
