= USS Boyd =

Fletcher-class destroyer

- USS Boyd

History

United States
- Name: Boyd
- Namesake: Joseph Boyd
- Builder: Bethlehem Shipbuilding, San Pedro, California
- Laid down: 2 April 1942
- Launched: 29 October 1942
- Sponsored by: Mrs. C. W. Styer
- Commissioned: 8 May 1943
- Recommissioned: 24 November 1950
- Decommissioned: 15 January 1947 (reserve); 1 October 1969
- Stricken: 1 October 1969
- Honours and awards: 11 battle stars (World War II); 5 battle stars (Korean War)
- Fate: Transferred to Turkey, 1 October 1969

Turkey
- Name: Iskenderun
- Acquired: 1 October 1969
- Stricken: 1981
- Identification: D-343
- Fate: Scrapped

General characteristics
- Class & type: Fletcher-class destroyer
- Displacement: 2,050 tons standard; 2,940 tons full load
- Length: 376 ft 5 in (114.7 m)
- Beam: 39 ft 7 in (12.1 m)
- Draft: 17 ft 9 in (5.4 m) maximum navigational; 13 ft 9 in (4.2 m) limiting
- Propulsion: 60,000 shp (45,000 kW); 2 propellers
- Speed: 35.2 knots (65.2 km/h; 40.5 mph) (trial at 2,800 tons displacement)
- Range: 6,500 nmi (12,000 km) at 15 kn (28 km/h)
- Complement: 329
- Armament: 5 × single Mk 12 5 in (127 mm)/38 guns; 5 × twin 40 mm (1.6 in) Bofors AA guns; 7 × single 20 mm (0.8 in) Oerlikon AA guns; 2 × quintuple 21 in (533 mm) torpedo tubes; 6 × single depth charge throwers; 2 × depth charge racks

USS Boyd (DD-544) was a Fletcher-class destroyer of the United States Navy.

== Namesake ==
Joseph Boyd enlisted in the Navy 4 April 1803 as a steward. On 16 February 1804 he took part in Stephen Decatur's expedition into Tripoli harbor during the First Barbary War which burned the USS Philadelphia following her capture by the Tripolitanians. Boyd later became a clerk.

== Construction and commissioning ==
Boyd was launched 29 October 1942 by Bethlehem Shipbuilding, San Pedro, Los Angeles, sponsored by Mrs. C. W. Styer, wife of Captain Styer, and commissioned 8 May 1943, Lieutenant Commander Ulysses S. G. Sharp, Jr. in command.

== History ==
As a unit of the Pacific Fleet, Boyd departed for Pearl Harbor 14 July 1943. After additional training she took part in the occupation of Baker Island (1 September 1943) and then joined the Fast Carrier Task Force as a screening vessel for the Wake Island raid (5–6 October) and the Gilbert Islands landings (19 November–8 December).

On 26 November 1943, Boyd was credited with sinking the Imperial Japanese Navy I-39 in the Gilberts area.

During the bombardment of Nauru Island (8 December 1943) Boyd was damaged by a Japanese shore battery while on a rescue mission for a US plane that had been shot and made an emergency landing into the water. Boyd was ordered to go pick up survivors of the plane crash at 10:33 AM. Fifty-seven minutes later they found the raft with the pilots on board. At 11:40, Boyd pulled up against the raft, shielding it from Japanese batteries.

Approximately two minutes later, 11:42, Boyd was hit by Japanese shells. The first shell passed through the main deck into the engine room, just above one of the ship's two fresh water evaporators. This strike severed at least one 600 pound high pressure, 850-degree superheated steam line, and also destroyed one of the ship's two power distribution boards. All of the men in the forward engine room died. The second shell hit inside the #1 stack.

Total casualties were twelve men killed, 8 wounded. As a result, she had to return to Espiritu Santo, New Hebrides, for repairs.

Following repairs Boyd arrived at Pearl Harbor 23 March 1944. She joined Task Force 58 (TF 58) for

- the Hollandia landings (21–24 April);
- Truk-Satawan-Ponape raid (29 April–1 May);
- Saipan landings (11–24 June);
- 1st Bonins raid (15–16 June);
- Battle of the Philippine Sea (19–20 June);
- 2d Bonins raid (24 June);
- 3d Bonins raid (3–4 July);
- invasion of Guam (12 July–15 August);
- Palau-Yap-Ulithi, raid (25–27 July);
- 4th Bonins raid (4–5 August);
- occupation of the southern Palaus (9–24 September),
- and Morotai landings (15 September).

She then joined TF 38 for the strikes against Okinawa (10 October), northern Luzon and Formosa (11–14 October), and Luzon (15 October), which preceded the Leyte landings. After taking part in the Battle for Leyte Gulf (24–25 October) she screened the carriers launching strikes against Luzon (5–6, 13–14, and 19–25 November).

Between 31 December 1944 and 22 January 1945 Boyd served as an escort vessel. She then took part in the bombardment of Iwo Jima and in the occupation of the island (19 February–1 March). She arrived off Okinawa 95 March and remained there on screening duty until 30 June. She then rejoined the 3rd Fleet for strikes against the Japanese home islands (10 July–7 August). One of the first vessels to return to the United States after the Japanese surrender, Boyd departed Okinawa 7 September and underwent overhaul at Mare Island Navy Yard (25 September–28 November). She then moved to San Diego, arriving 14 January 1948 and was placed out of commission in reserve 15 January 1947.

Recommissioned 24 November 1950, the destroyer reported to the Pacific Fleet. Following training off the west coast, Boyd departed for Korea 28 May 1951. She remained there, serving with TF 77 and on the Formosa Strait Patrol, until returning to San Diego 21 December 1951. Boyd departed San Diego 12 July 1952 for her second Korean tour. She served on the Wonsan blockade and took part in the amphibious demonstration off Kojo (6–15 October). She departed Korean waters in late January and arrived at San Diego 16 February 1953. After the end of the Korean fighting Boyd continued operations along the west coast and made three Far Eastern tours.

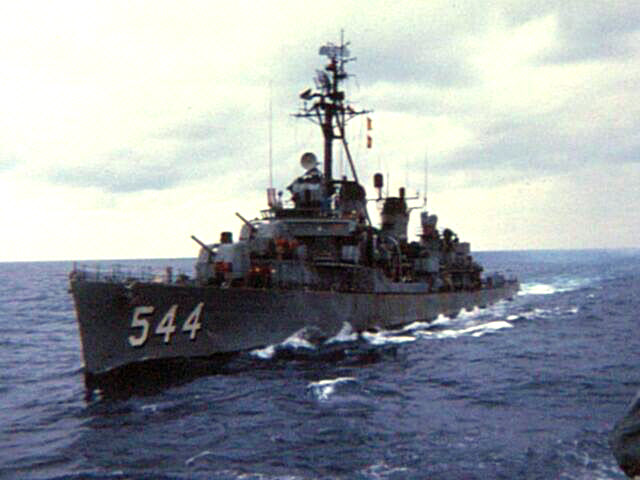
USS Boyd underway at sea in the 1960s.

Boyd received 11 battle stars for World War II and five for her Korean War service.

== TCG Iskenderun (D-343) ==
On 1 October 1969, Boyd was decommissioned, stricken from the Naval Vessel Register, and transferred to Turkey. She served in the Turkish Navy as TCG Iskenderun (D-343). In 1981, she was stricken and scrapped.

== Bibliography ==
- Pauley, John (2010). "Question 13/43: U.S. Warships Hit by Japanese Coast Defense Guns". Warship International. XLVII (2): 113–114. ISSN 0043-0374.
