= Japanese submarine I-175 =

Japanese World War II submarine

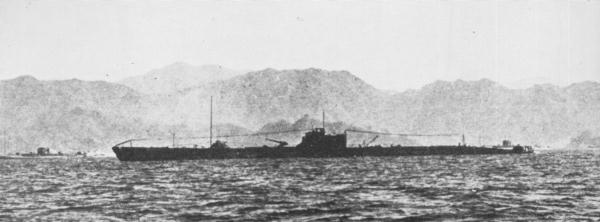
- I-75 in late October 1941.

History

Empire of Japan
- Name: I-75
- Ordered: 1934
- Builder: Mitsubishi Heavy Industries, Kobe, Japan
- Laid down: 1 November 1934
- Launched: 16 September 1937
- Commissioned: 8 December 1938
- Renamed: I-175 on 20 May 1942
- Fate: Sunk 4 February 1944
- Stricken: 10 July 1944

General characteristics
- Class & type: Kaidai type (KD6B Type)
- Displacement: 1,839 tonnes (1,810 long tons) surfaced; 2,605 tonnes (2,564 long tons) submerged
- Length: 105 m (344 ft 6 in)
- Beam: 8.2 m (26 ft 11 in)
- Draft: 4.57 m (15 ft 0 in)
- Installed power: 9,000 bhp (6,711 kW) (diesels); 1,800 hp (1,342 kW) (electric motors)
- Propulsion: Diesel-electric; 2 × diesel engines; 2 × electric motors
- Speed: 23 knots (43 km/h; 26 mph) surfaced; 8 knots (15 km/h; 9.2 mph) submerged
- Range: 10,000 nmi (19,000 km; 12,000 mi) at 16 knots (30 km/h; 18 mph) surfaced; 65 nmi (120 km; 75 mi) at 3 knots (5.6 km/h; 3.5 mph) submerged
- Test depth: 75 m (246 ft)
- Complement: 70
- Armament: 6 × 533 mm (21 in) torpedo tubes (4 bow, 2 stern); 1 × 120 mm (4.7 in) deck gun; 2 × single 13.2 mm (0.52 in) anti-aircraft machine gun

I-75, later I-175, was an Imperial Japanese Navy Kaidai-type cruiser submarine of the KD6B subclass commissioned in 1938. During World War II, she took part in the attack on Pearl Harbor, the Battle of Midway, the Guadalcanal campaign, the Aleutian Islands campaign, and the Gilbert and Marshall Islands campaign and operated off Australia, before she was sunk in 1944 during her 10th war patrol. She is best known for sinking the United States Navy escort carrier USS Liscome Bay on 24 November 1943.

== Design and description ==
The submarines of the KD6B subclass were very similar to the preceding KD6A subclass. They displaced 1,814 tonnes (1,785 long tons) surfaced and 2,605 tonnes (2,564 long tons) submerged. The submarines were 105 meters (344 ft 6 in) long and had a beam of 8.2 m (26 ft 11 in) and a draft of 4.57 m (15 ft 0 in). They had a diving depth of 75 m (250 ft)

For surface running, the submarines were powered by two 4,500-brake-horsepower (3,356 kW) diesel engines, each driving one propeller shaft. When submerged, each propeller was driven by a 900-horsepower (671 kW) electric motor. They could reach 23 knots (43 km/h; 26 mph) on the surface and 8 kn (15 km/h; 9.2 mph) under water. On the surface, the KD3Bs had a range of 10,000 nautical miles (19,000 km; 12,000 mi) at 16 kn (30 km/h; 18 mph); submerged, they had a range of 65 nmi (120 km; 75 mi) at 3 kn (5.6 km/h; 3.5 mph).

The submarines were armed with six internal 53.3 cm (21.0 in) torpedo tubes, four in the bow and two in the stern. They carried a total of 14 torpedoes. They also were armed with one 120 mm (4.7 in) deck gun and two Hotchkiss M1929 13.2 mm (0.52 in) antiaircraft machine guns.

== Construction and commissioning ==
I-75 was laid down on 1 November 1934 by Mitsubishi in Kobe, Japan. Launched on 16 September 1937, she was completed and commissioned on 18 December 1938.

== Service history ==
=== Before World War II ===
I-75 dry-docked in Kobe shortly before launch, September 1937

On the day of her commissioning, I-75 was attached to the Kure Naval District and assigned to Submarine Division 11 in Submarine Squadron 2 in the 2nd Fleet, a component of the Combined Fleet. On 15 November 1939, her division was transferred to Submarine Squadron 3, also in the 2nd Fleet. I-75 departed Okinawa on 27 March 1940 in company with the submarines I-68, I-69, I-70, I-73, and I-74 for a training cruise in southern Chinese waters, completing it when the six submarines arrived at Takao, Formosa, on 2 April 1940. On 11 October 1940, I-75 was one of 98 Imperial Japanese Navy ships that gathered along with more than 500 aircraft on the Japanese coast at Yokohama Bay for an Imperial fleet review — the largest fleet review in Japanese history — in honor of the 2,600th anniversary of the enthronement of the Emperor Jimmu, Japan's legendary first emperor. On 15 November 1940, Submarine Squadron 3 was reassigned to the 6th Fleet, a component of the Combined Fleet.

On 11 November 1941, the 6th Fleet's commander, Vice Admiral Mitsumi Shimizu, held a meeting with the commanding officers of the submarines of Submarine Squadron 3 aboard his flagship, the light cruiser Katori, and his chief of staff briefed them on plans for Operation Z, the upcoming surprise attack on Pearl Harbor in Hawaii. The attack would begin the Pacific campaign and bring Japan and the United States into World War II.

As Japanese military forces began to deploy for the opening Japanese offensive of the war, I-75 was assigned to the Submarine Advance Force on 11 November 1941 and departed Saeki Bay on the coast of Kyushu that day in company with I-74 bound for Kwajalein Atoll, which the two submarines reached on 20 November 1941. Assigned to support Operation Z, I-75 got underway from Kwajalein on 23 November 1941 and set course for the Hawaiian Islands. While she was en route, she received the message "Climb Mount Niitaka 1208" (Japanese: Niitakayama nobore 1208) from the Combined Fleet on 2 December 1941, indicating that war with the Allies would commence on 8 December 1941 Japan time, which was on 7 December 1941 on the other side of the International Date Line in Hawaii.

=== World War II ===
==== First war patrol ====
When the attack on Pearl Harbor took place on the morning of 7 December 1941, the submarines of Submarine Squadron 3 were deployed south of Oahu, with orders to reconnoiter the area and attack any ships that sortied from Pear Harbor. I-75′s patrol area was 25 to 50 nautical miles (46 to 93 km; 29 to 58 mi) southwest of Oahu.

I-75 bombarded the harbor at Kahului on the north coast of Maui on 15 December 1941. She fired 16 rounds from her 120-millimeter (4.7 in) deck gun. Two shells struck the Maui Pineapple Company cannery, which sustained an estimated US$654.38 in damage.

On 17 December 1941, I-75 hit the American 3,253- or 3,545-gross register ton (according to different sources) merchant ship Manini with one torpedo either 100 or 180 nautical miles (190 or 330 km; 120 or 210 mi) (according to different sources) south of Hawaii, then surfaced and illuminated Manini with a searchlight. Manini, which was making a voyage from Honolulu, Hawaii, to San Francisco, California, sank by the stern at 17°46′N 157°03′W with the loss of one crewman. The United States Navy destroyer USS Patterson (DD-392) rescued Manini′s survivors on 28 December 1941.

I-75 departed the Hawaiian Islands area, and on 24 December 1941, bombarded Naval Air Station Palmyra on Palmyra Atoll in the northern Line Islands. Opening fire at 04:55 Greenwich Civil Time, she fired twelve 120-millimeter (4.7 in) rounds, targeting the atoll′s radio station, and with one of the shells hit the United States Army Corps of Engineers dredge Sacramento, which was anchored in the lagoon. A 5-inch (127 mm) coastal artillery battery on the atoll returned fire, forcing her to submerge and withdraw. She arrived at Kwajalein on 31 December 1941.

==== January–April 1942 ====
I-75 and I-74 got underway from Kwajalein on 13 January 1942 and headed north, passing Midway Atoll in the Northwestern Hawaiian Islands on their way to the Aleutian Islands. From the Aleutians, the two submarines made their way to Yokosuka, Japan, where they arrived on 19 February 1942.

==== Second war patrol ====
I-75′s stay in Japan ended on 15 April 1942, when she began her second war patrol, departing Kure in company with I-74 to form a patrol line east of Japan. While she was at sea, 16 United States Army Air Forces B-25 Mitchell bombers launched by the aircraft carrier USS Hornet (CV-8) struck targets on Honshu in the Doolittle Raid on 18 April 1942, but I-75 made no contact with enemy forces. I-75 and I-74 concluded their patrol with their arrival at Kwajalein on 10 May 1942.

==== Third war patrol: Midway operation ====
On 20 May 1942, I-75 was renumbered I-175 and I-74 became I-174. The two submarines departed Kwajalein in company that day to participate in Operation MI, the planned Japanese invasion of Midway Atoll. Plans called for them first to support a preliminary phase of the Midway operation, Operation K-2, which called for the Japanese submarines I-121 and I-123 to refuel two Kawanishi H8K (Allied reporting name "Emily") flying boats at the French Frigate Shoals in the Northwestern Hawaiian Islands so that the two aircraft could conduct a reconnaissance flight over Pearl Harbor, while I-175 patrolled 80 nautical miles (150 km; 92 mi) southwest of Oahu to provide weather reports in support of the operation. The aircraft were scheduled to arrive at the French Frigate Shoals on 30 May 1942 and make their Pearl Harbor flight on 31 May. When I-123 arrived off the French Frigate Shoals on 29 May 1942, however, she found the U.S. Navy seaplane tenders USS Ballard (AVD-10) and USS Thornton (AVD-11) already operating flying boats there. She radioed her news of this sighting after she surfaced that night, and the reconnaissance flight was postponed for a day. When I-123 again observed the French Frigate Shoals on 31 May, she found the American ships still there and noted U.S. Navy flying boats landing in the lagoon, and this news resulted in the Japanese concluding that the U.S. Navy was using the atoll as a base. The Japanese decided to cancel the reconnaissance flights entirely.

With their supporting mission for the aircraft cancelled, I-175 and I-174 took patrol stations in support of the scheduled invasion of Midway. The Battle of Midway began on 4 June 1942, and it ended on 7 June 1942 in a decisive Japanese defeat. The Japanese cancelled the invasion of Midway. I-175 made no contact with enemy forces during the battle and concluded her patrol with her arrival at Kwajalein on 20 June 1942.

==== Fourth war patrol ====
On 8 July 1942, I-175 set out from Kwajalein on her fourth war patrol, assigned a patrol area in the Tasman Sea off the eastern coast of Australia between Sydney and 35°S. She arrived off Sydney on 20 July 1942. She was on the surface 20 nautical miles (37 km; 23 mi) off Newcastle, New South Wales, on 23 July 1942 when she hit the Australian 3,279-gross register ton armed merchant ship Allara with a single torpedo at 33°03′S 152°22′E. As Allara — which was on a voyage from Cairns, Queensland, to Sydney with a cargo of sugar — began to settle by the stern, her crew abandoned ship. She did not sink, however, and eventually she was reboarded and towed to Newcastle.

On 24 July 1942, I-175 torpedoed and damaged the 3,345-gross register ton Australian merchant ship Murada off Crowdy Head, 82 nautical miles (152 km; 94 mi) northeast of Newcastle. On 26 July 1942, she survived a depth-charge attack by the Royal Australian Navy corvette HMAS Cairns, then moved southward. She torpedoed and sank the French 2,795-gross register ton merchant ship Cagou, which was carrying a cargo of nickel ore, 160 nautical miles (300 km; 180 mi) northeast of Newcastle on 28 July 1942.

During the predawn hours of 3 August 1942, I-175 was on the surface when she encountered the Australian 233-gross register ton steam trawler Dureenbee off Moruya, New South Wales, at 35°55′S 150°33′E. At 01:30, she fired a 120 mm (4.7 in) round, which missed, but prompted the surprised Dureenbee to transmit a distress signal. She then opened fire with machine guns, destroying Dureenbee′s radio room and badly wounding her radio operator. I-175′s next two 120 mm shells hit Dureenbee, destroying her wheel house and crippling her steam engine, causing her to go dead in the water. I-175 circled Dureenbee for the next 45 minutes, firing her deck gun, before submerging. She resurfaced six minutes later, and departed to seaward, leaving the crippled Dureenbee with one crewman dead and two others seriously wounded, both of whom later died of their injuries. A Royal Australian Air Force aircraft sighted Dureenbee at 06:20, and the Australian fishing trawler Mirrabooka with embarked members of the Australian Volunteer Defence Corps later arrived and took off Dureenbee′s crew. On 4 August 1942, Mirrabooka found the abandoned Dureenbee aground on rocks on the coast of New South Wales off the North Head of Batemans Bay, but attempts to tow her off failed and salvage attempts were abandoned. During and after World War II, some authors described I-175′s attack on the unarmed Dureenbee as a war crime, but in fact Allied submarines made similar attacks on Japanese fishing vessels throughout the war as a way of attacking Japan's war economy and because such vessels sometimes served as early-warning pickets for Japanese military forces.

On 5 August 1942, I-175 arrived in a new patrol area south of Jervis Bay on the coast of New South Wales. On 7 August 1942, however, the Guadalcanal campaign began with United States Marine Corps landings on Guadalcanal in the southeastern Solomon Islands, and that day I-175 received orders to move to an area west of San Cristobal in the southeastern Solomons. She made her transit via the Nouméa area in New Caledonia.

At dawn on 12 August 1942, I-175 was on the surface 170 nautical miles (310 km; 200 mi) southwest of Espiritu Santo when two U.S. Navy SBD-3 Dauntless dive bombers from the aircraft carrier USS Saratoga (CV-3) attacked her. She submerged, but not before suffering bomb damage. Two destroyers — USS Grayson (DD-435) and USS Sterett (DD-407) — were detached from Saratoga′s escort screen in Task Force 11 and forced her to remain submerged until dark, when she finally escaped. She headed for Rabaul on New Ireland in the Bismarck Archipelago for emergency repairs, arriving there on 17 August 1942.

==== Fifth war patrol ====
I-175 departed Rabaul for to begin her fifth war patrol on 22 August 1942, assigned a patrol area southeast of Guadalcanal extending from the Rennell Island area eastward to the waters southeast of San Cristobal. She reconnoitered the anchorage at Lungga Roads off Lungga Point on the north coast of Guadalcanal on 11 September 1942. The patrol otherwise was uneventful, and she concluded it with her arrival at Truk Atoll in the Caroline Islands on 21 September 1942.

==== Sixth war patrol ====
On 16 October 1942, I-175 got underway from Truk for her sixth war patrol, ordered to form a patrol line with I-174 and patrol an area in the Solomon Islands southeast of the Indispensable Reefs and Shortland Islands. I-175 and I-174 later were ordered to leave their patrol areas and join the submarines I-172 and Ro-34 in an attempt to intercept an American convoy, but I-175 did not encounter enemy ships. She returned to Truk on 19 November 1942 and was assigned that day to the B Patrol Unit with I-174 and the submarines I-9, I-15, I-21, and I-24.

==== November 1942–May 1943 ====
On 20 November 1942, I-175 suffered damage in an anchorage in Truk Lagoon south of Eten Island (known to the Japanese as "Takeshima") in a collision with the 16,764-gross register ton oiler Nisshin Maru and was run aground to prevent her from sinking. After she was refloated, I-175 departed Truk on 27 November 1942 bound for Kure, Japan, which she reached on 4 December 1942. She moved to Yokosuka, Japan, on 5 December 1942 for repairs. During her stay in Yokosuka, Submarine Division 11 was disbanded on 15 March 1943, and she was reassigned to Submarine Division 12, also in Submarine Squadron 3.

==== Aleutian Islands campaign ====
As I-175′s repairs were being completed, Japan's fortunes in the Aleutian Islands campaign waned as U. S. Army forces landed on Attu in the Aleutian Islands on 11 May 1943, beginning the Battle of Attu. As the fighting on Attu raged, I-175 put to sea from Kure on 17 May 1943 to support Japanese forces in the Aleutians. On 21 May 1943, the Japanese Imperial General Staff decided to evacuate the Japanese garrison on Kiska, but on 24 May, I-175 and the submarines I-169 and I-171 received orders to operate in an area 200 nmi (370 km; 230 mi) south of Kiska to support a planned Japanese counter-landing on Attu. The Battle of Attu concluded on 30 May 1943 with the annihilation of the Japanese garrison before the counter-landing could take place. I-175 proceeded to Paramushiro in the northern Kurile Islands.

On 5 June 1943, I-175 departed Paramushiro on a supply run to Kiska, where she unloaded one ton of ammunition and 15 tons of food, and embarked 60 passengers. She then returned to Paramushiro, where she arrived on 10 June 1943 and refueled from the oiler Teiyō Maru on 11 June 1943. On 13 June 1943, she began another run to Kiska, calling there on 17 June to deliver 16 tons of supplies and embark 70 passengers, and returning to Paramushiro on 20 June 1943.

I-175 departed Paramushiro on 24 June 1943 to begin her eighth war patrol, ordered to attack Allied shipping in the North Pacific Ocean in an area 200 nmi (370 km; 230 mi) south of Amchitka with I-171. While she was on patrol, the Japanese evacuated their garrison on Kiska on 28 July 1943. She made no contact with enemy forces and concluded the patrol by heading back to Japan, arriving at Kure on 10 August 1943.

==== Ninth war patrol: USS Liscome Bay ====
I-175 got underway from Kure on 19 September 1943 and arrived at Truk on 25 September. She departed Truk on 16 October 1943 to begin her ninth war patrol, assigned a patrol area in the vicinity of Wake Island. On 20 October 1943, the submarine I-36 reported a large Allied convoy south of the Hawaiian Islands heading west, and I-175 and the submarines I-19, I-35, and I-169 received orders to intercept the convoy, but I-175 failed to make contact.

I-175 was heading back to Truk on 20 November 1943 when the U.S. offensive phase of the Gilbert and Marshall Islands campaign began on 20 November 1943 with the U.S. landings on Tarawa, beginning the Battle of Tarawa, and on Butaritari (erroneously referred to as "Makin Atoll" by U.S. forces), beginning the Battle of Makin, and she received orders to make for Butaritari at flank speed. She arrived off Butaritari on 24 November 1943 as U.S. Navy forces began their withdrawal after the U.S. seizure of the atoll, and as she approached a U.S. Navy task force that day was 20 nmi (37 km; 23 mi) off Butaritari when the U.S. Navy battleship USS New Mexico (BB-40) detected her on radar at dawn. She submerged and avoided an attack by U.S. forces. She continued her approach, and at 05:10, fired four torpedoes at the task force. Two of them missed the escort carrier USS Coral Sea (CVE-57), but one hit the escort carrier USS Liscome Bay, which was making 15 kn (28 km/h; 17 mph) and preparing to launch aircraft. It struck Liscome Bay on her starboard aft of her after engine room, detonating her bomb storage magazine. Liscome Bay′s stern disintegrated in a tremendous explosion and some debris and body parts struck New Mexico, which was steaming 1 nmi (1.9 km; 1.2 mi) away. At 05:24, the destroyer USS Kimberly (DD-521) gained sound contact on I-175 and attacked her with depth charges at 05:34.

Meanwhile, Liscome Bay sank at 05:33 at 02°54′N 172°30′E with the loss 55 officers — including the commander of Carrier Division 24 and Task Group 52, Rear Admiral Henry M. Mullinnix, and Liscome Bay′s commanding officer, Captain Irving D. Wiltsie — and 591 enlisted men, including Navy Cross recipient Cook Third Class Doris Miller. Twenty-three of Liscome Bay′s aircraft also went down with the ship, although five aloft at the time landed on the aircraft carriers USS Lexington (CV-16) and USS Yorktown (CV-10). The destroyer USS Franks (DD-554) and other destroyers rescued Liscome Bay′s 272 survivors.

On 26 November 1943, I-175 transmitted a report that she had survived a six-hour counterattack on 24 November by two destroyers, which had dropped 34 depth charges, six of which had detonated close aboard. She claimed three Type 95 torpedo hits on an aircraft carrier, which probably had sunk. On 27 November 1943, she reported that the depth charges had inflicted damage that limited her diving depth. After calling at Kwajalein overnight on 27–28 November 1943 to refuel, she proceeded to Truk, which she reached on 1 December 1943. Her commanding officer Nao Tobata (田畑直) received a personal citation on 8 January 1944 from the commander of the 6th Fleet, Vice Admiral Takeo Takagi.

==== Tenth war patrol ====
I-175 got underway from Truk on 27 January 1944 with the commander of Submarine Division 12 embarked to begin her 10th war patrol, making for a patrol area northeast of the Marshall Islands. While she was at sea, the next phase of the Gilbert and Marshall Islands campaign began when U.S. forces landed on Kwajalein and Roi-Namur (beginning the Battle of Kwajalein) and on Majuro. The same day, I-175 and the submarine Ro-39 received orders to proceed to Wotje Atoll in the Marshalls at flank speed. On 3 February 1944, I-175 reconnoitered Wotje Atoll.

==== Loss ====
The battleship USS New Jersey (BB-62) detected a vessel on radar east of Wotje at 22:03 on 3 February at a range of 21 nmi (39 km; 24 mi). Ordered to detach from the screen and investigate, the destroyer USS Charrette (DD-581) closed with the contact. At a range of 10,300 yards (9,400 m), the contact disappeared from Charrette′s radar, indicating a submerging submarine. Charrette achieved sonar contact on the submarine and at 00:03 on 4 February 1944. dropped eight depth charges before losing contact. Ordered to assist Charrette, the destroyer escort USS Fair (DE-35) arrived on the scene and at 00:40, fired a salvo of 10 Hedgehog projectiles. Charrette and Fair heard and felt four explosions, which sank the submarine — probably I-175 — 100 nmi (190 km; 120 mi) northwest of Jaluit Atoll at 06°48′N 168°08′E.

Most Japanese sources claim that Charrette and Fair sank Ro-39 on 4 February 1944 and that the destroyer USS Nicholas (DD-449) sank I-175 on 17 February 1944 northwest of the Marshall Islands at 10°34′N 173°31′E.

On 26 March 1944, the Imperial Japanese Navy declared I-175 to be presumed lost with all 100 hands in the Kwajalein area. The Japanese struck her from the Navy List on 10 July 1944.
