= Battle of Makin =

Battle of the Pacific Theater of World War II

- Part of the Gilbert and Marshall Islands campaign of the Pacific Theater (World War II)
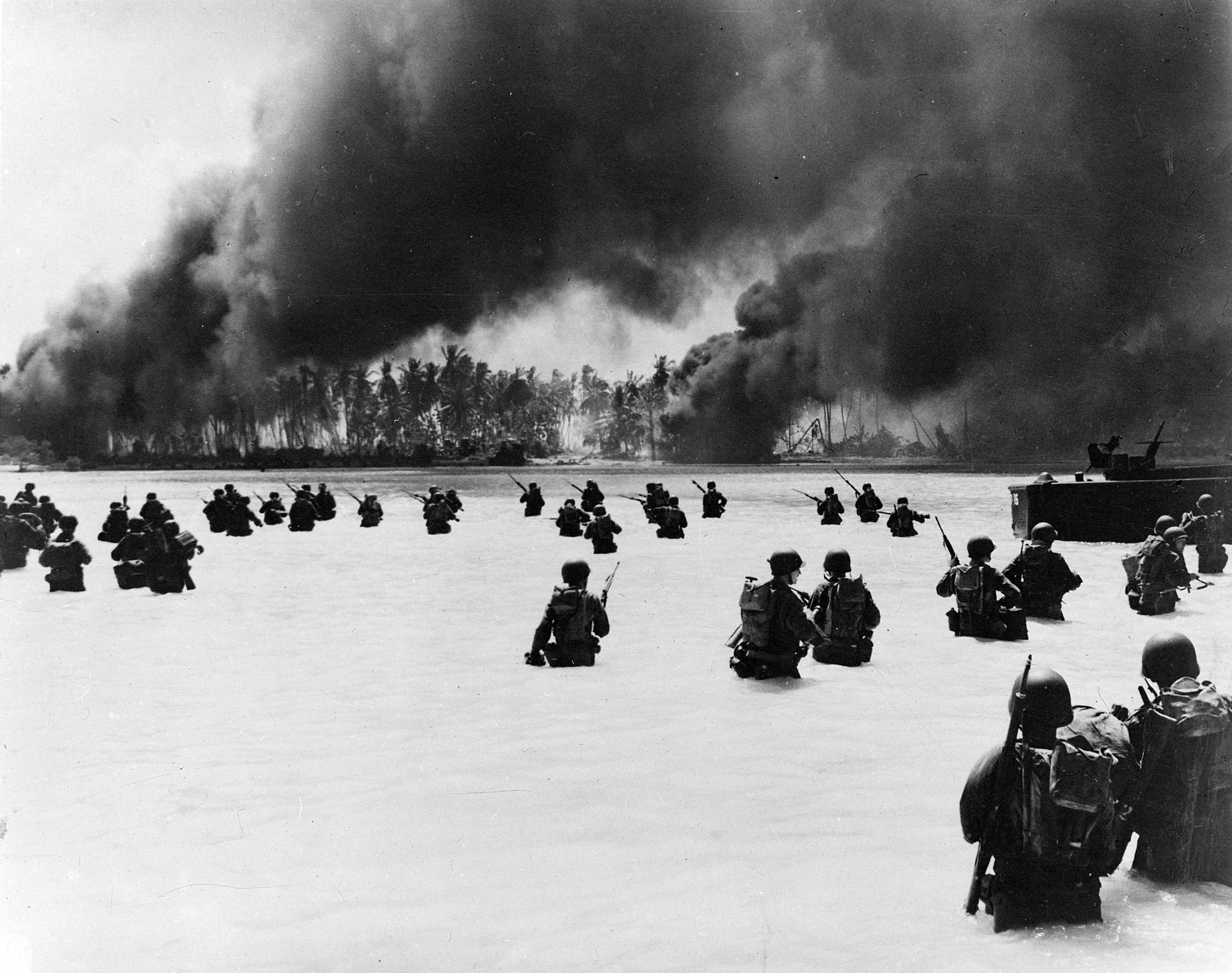
- Soldiers of the US Army's 2nd Battalion, 165th Infantry, struggle to shore on Yellow Beach on Butaritari Island.
Date	20 – 24 November 1943
Location	Makin Atoll, Gilbert Islands 3.0700°N 172.7890°E
Result	American victory

Belligerents
United States; Gilbert and Ellice Islands	Japan

Commanders and leaders
Richmond K. Turner; Ralph C. Smith	Saisuke Fujino †

Units involved
27th Infantry Division 193rd Tank Battalion 2nd Raider Battalion	Gilberts Invasion Special Landing Force

Strength
6,470 soldiers 3 escort carriers 4 old battleships 4 heavy cruisers 16 destroyers 9 transports & landing ships	400 soldiers 400 Japanese and Korean labourers 3 light tanks 4 anti-tank guns 1 submarine

Casualties and losses
821 killed (755 Navy, 66 Army); 185 wounded 1 escort carrier sunk 1 battleship lightly damaged	395 killed 17 soldiers captured 129 Korean labourers captured 1 submarine damaged

The Battle of Makin was an engagement of the Pacific campaign of World War II, fought from 20 to 24 November 1943 on Makin Atoll in the Gilbert Islands.

== Background ==
=== Japanese invasion and fortification ===
On 10 December 1941, three days after the attack on Pearl Harbor, 300 Japanese troops plus laborers of the Gilberts Invasion Special Landing Force had arrived off Makin Atoll and occupied it without resistance. Lying east of the Marshall Islands, Makin was intended as an excellent seaplane base to protect the eastern flank of the Japanese perimeter from an Allied attack by extending Japanese air patrols closer to islands held by the Allies: Howland Island, Baker Island, Tuvalu, and Phoenix and Ellice Islands.

Heavy aircraft losses and the disabling of four heavy cruisers during the bombing of Rabaul meant that the original Japanese plan of a strike at the American invasion fleet by forces based at Truk in the nearby Caroline Islands was scrapped. The garrisons at Tarawa and Makin were left to their fate.

=== Marine raid on Makin ===
On 17 August 1942, 211 Marines of the 2nd Marine Raider Battalion under command of Colonel Evans Carlson and Captain James Roosevelt were landed on Makin from two submarines, USS Nautilus and USS Argonaut. The Japanese garrison only posted 83 to 160 men under the command of a warrant officer. The Raiders killed many Japanese but ultimately, under heavy fire withdrew after losing 21 killed and 9 captured. The Japanese moved their prisoners to Kwajalein Atoll, where they were later beheaded. One objective of the raid was to confuse the Japanese about U.S. intentions in the Pacific, but it had the effect of alerting the Japanese to the strategic importance of the Gilbert Islands and led to their further reinforcement and fortification.

After Carlson's raid, the Japanese reinforced the Gilberts. Makin was garrisoned with a single company of the 5th Special Base Force (700–800 men) in August 1942, and work on both the seaplane base and coastal defenses of the atoll was resumed in earnest. By July 1943 the seaplane base on Makin was completed and ready to accommodate Kawanishi H8K "Emily" flying boat bombers, Nakajima A6M2-N "Rufe" floatplane fighters and Aichi E13A "Jake" reconnaissance seaplanes. Its defenses were also completed, although they were not as extensive as on Tarawa Atoll—the main Japanese Navy air base in the Gilberts. The Chitose and 653rd Air Corps were detached and deployed here. While the Japanese were building up their defenses in the Gilberts, American forces were making plans to retake the islands.

=== U.S. plans to attack ===
The end of the Aleutian Islands campaign and progress in the Solomon Islands, combined with increasing amounts of men and materiel, gave the United States Navy the resources to make an invasion of the central Pacific in late 1943. Admiral Chester Nimitz had argued for this invasion earlier in 1943, but the resources were not available to carry it out at the same time as Operation Cartwheel, the envelopment of Rabaul in the Bismarck Islands. The plan was to approach the Japanese home islands by "island hopping": establishing naval and air bases in one group of islands to support the attack on the next. The Gilbert Islands were the first step in this chain.

In June 1943, the Joint Chiefs of Staff directed Admiral Chester W. Nimitz, Commander in Chief of the Pacific Fleet (CINCPAC), to submit a plan to occupy the Marshall Islands. Initially both Nimitz and Admiral Ernest J. King, the Chief of Naval Operations, wanted to attack right into the heart of the Japanese outer defense perimeter, but any plan for assaulting the Marshalls directly from Pearl Harbor would have required more troops and transports than the Pacific Fleet had at the time. Considering these drawbacks and the limited combat experience of the U.S. forces, King and Nimitz decided to take the Marshalls in a step-by-step operation via the Ellice and Gilbert Islands. The Gilberts lay within 200 miles (320 km) of the southern Marshalls and were well within range of United States Army Air Forces (USAAF) Consolidated B-24 Liberator aircraft based in the Ellice Islands, which could provide bombing support and long-range reconnaissance for operations in the Gilberts. With those advantages in mind, on 20 July 1943 the joint Chiefs of Staff decided to capture the Tarawa and Abemama atolls in the Gilberts, plus nearby Nauru Island. The operation was codenamed "Operation Galvanic."

V Amphibious Corps and 27th Infantry Division commanders

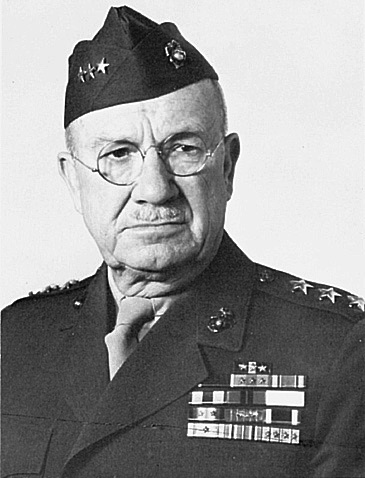
Maj. Gen. Holland M. Smith, USMC

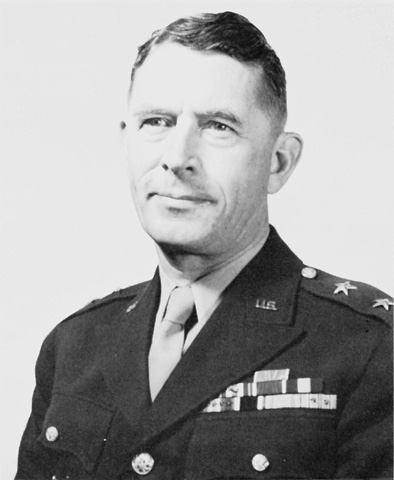
Maj. Gen. Ralph C. Smith, USA

On 4 September, the U.S. 5th Fleet's amphibious troops were designated the V Amphibious Corps and placed under Marine Corps Major General Holland Smith. The V Amphibious Corps had two divisions, the 2nd Marine Division based in New Zealand, and the U.S. Army's 27th Infantry Division based in Hawaii. The 27th Infantry Division had been a New York National Guard unit before being called into federal service in October 1940. It was transferred to Hawaii and remained there for 1½ years before being chosen by Lieutenant General Robert C. Richardson Jr., U.S. Army Commanding General in the Central Pacific, for the Gilbert Islands invasion. Captain James Jones (father of James L. Jones, Commandant of the Marine Corps 1999–2003), Commanding Officer of Amphibious Reconnaissance Company, VAC performed a periscope reconnaissance of the Gilberts aboard the submarine USS Nautilus, establishing accurate accounts of the beachheads for the upcoming invasion.

The 27th Infantry Division was tasked to supply the landing force, with one regimental combat team (the 165th Infantry Regiment, the famed "Fighting 69th" of the New York National Guard), reinforced by a battalion landing team (the 3rd Battalion, 105th Infantry Regiment), supported by the 105th Field Artillery Battalion and the 193rd Tank Battalion, under Major General Ralph C. Smith, a veteran of World War I who had assumed command in November 1942. He was one of the most highly respected officers in the U. S. Army of the time. In April 1943, the 27th Infantry Division had begun preparing for amphibious operations.

Planning for the 27th Infantry Division's role in "Galvanic" (the Army portion was codenamed "Kourbash") began in early August 1943, with Nauru Island in the western Gilberts as the original objective. Unlike the other objectives, Nauru was an actual island, much larger in size and more heavily garrisoned.

However, in September 1943 the 27th's objective changed. The difficulty of providing adequate naval and air support of simultaneous operations at Tarawa and the much more distant Nauru, plus lack of sufficient transport to carry the entire division required to take the larger, more heavily defended Nauru, caused Admiral Nimitz to shift the 27th's objective from Nauru to Makin Atoll, in the northeast Gilberts. The 27th Infantry Division staff learned the change of target on 28 September, scrapped the original Nauru plan, and began planning to capture Makin.

== Prelude ==
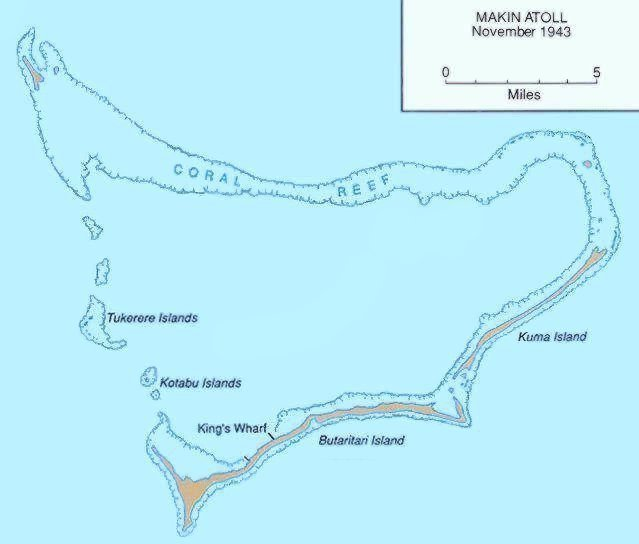
Makin Atoll

The invasion fleet, Task Force 52 (TF 52) commanded by Rear Admiral Richmond K. Turner, left Pearl Harbor on 10 November 1943. The landing force, Task Group 52.6, consisted of units of the 27th Infantry Division transported by attack transports Neville, Leonard Wood, Calvert, and Pierce; attack cargo ship Alcyone; landing ship dock Belle Grove; and LSTs −31, −78, and −179 of Task Group 52.1.

Prior to the invasion, the strength of the Japanese garrison Makin Atoll's main island, Butaritari was between 700 and 800 men. There were as many as 284 naval infantrymen from the 3rd Special Base Force's Makin Detachment, about 100 aviation personnel from the 802nd and 952nd Naval Air Groups, and over 400 laborers from the 111st Construction Unit and 4th Construction Bureau Detachment. These men were under the command of IJN Lieutenant(jg) Saisuke Fujino (藤野斉助) from the 3rd Special Base Force. Including laborers who took up arms, the total number armed combatants likely did not exceed 300 men.

Japanese records list the garrison's main armament was two Type 95 Ha-Go light tanks, six 8cm naval guns, three anti-tank guns, two 13mm anti-aircraft machine guns, several light and heavy machine guns, and a small number of grenade dischargers and flamethrowers. Butaritari's land defenses were centered around the lagoon shore, near the seaplane base in the central part of the island. There were two tank barrier systems: the west tank barrier extended from the lagoon two-thirds of the way across Butaritari, was 12 to 13 feet (4.0 m) wide and 15 feet (4.6 m) deep, and was protected by one anti-tank gun in a concrete pillbox, six machine gun positions, and 50 rifle pits. The east tank barrier, 14 feet (4.3 m) wide and 6 feet (1.8 m) in depth, stretched from the lagoon across two-thirds of the island and bent westward with log antitank barricades at each end. It was protected by a double apron of barbed wire and an intricate system of gun emplacements and rifle pits.

A series of strongpoints was established along Butaritari's ocean side, with 8-inch (200 mm) coastal defense guns, three 37 mm anti-tank gun positions, 10 machine gun emplacements and 85 rifle pits. The Japanese expected the invasion to come on the ocean side of Butaritari, following the example of Carlson's raid in 1942, and established their defenses two miles (3.2 km) from where the raid had taken place. Without aircraft, ships, or hope of reinforcement or relief, the outnumbered and outgunned defenders could only hope to delay the coming American attack for as long as possible.

== Battle ==
=== Invasion ===
Air operations against Makin began on 13 November 1943, with B-24 bombers of the Seventh Air Force from the Ellice Islands. Grumman FM-1 Wildcat fighters escorted Douglas SBD Dauntless dive bombers and Grumman TBF Avengers from escort carriers USS Liscome Bay, USS Coral Sea and USS Corregidor; followed by 8-inch (200 mm) support guns from fire support ship USS Minneapolis and other war vessels. During the bombardment, a turret explosion on battleship USS Mississippi killed 43 sailors.

Troops began to go ashore at two beaches at 08:30 on 20 November. The initial landings on Red Beach went according to plan with the assault troops moving rapidly inland after an uneventful trip on the ocean side of the island. Their progress off the beach was slowed only by an occasional sniper and the need to negotiate their way around the debris and water-filled craters left by the air and naval bombardment. The craters in particular stymied tank support of the Red Beach forces by the light tanks of the 193rd Tank Battalion when the lead M3 Stuart light tank became partially submerged in a shellhole and blocked passage of all the vehicles behind it.

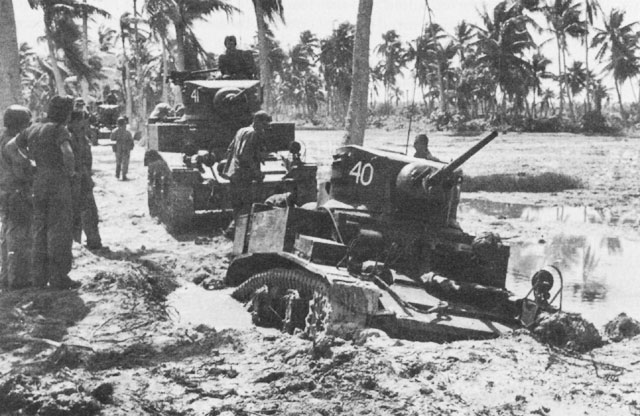
Makin Island – M3 Stuart light tank, bogged down in a shell crater, holds up the advance on the narrow causeway north of Jill lake.

As the landing craft approached Yellow Beach from the lagoon, they began to receive small-arms and machine-gun fire from the island's defenders. The assault troops were also surprised to discover that even though they were approaching the beach at high tide as planned, a miscalculation of the lagoon's depth caused their small boats to go aground, forcing them to walk the final 250 yards (230 m) to the beach in waist-deep water. Equipment and weapons were lost or water-soaked, and three men were killed approaching the beach, mainly because the defenders chose to make their final stand farther inland along the tank barriers.

The U.S. invasion plan was conceived in the hope of luring the Japanese into committing most of its forces to oppose the first landings on Red Beach and thereby allow the troops landing on Yellow Beach to attack from the rear. The Japanese, however, did not respond to the attack on Red Beach and withdrew from Yellow Beach with only harassing fire, leaving the troops of the 27th Division no choice but to knock out the fortified strongpoints one by one. Reduction operations were hampered by the frequent inability to use heavy support weapons, including tanks, because of the danger of cross-fire. The commander of the 165th Infantry Regiment, Colonel Gardiner Conroy, was killed in action by a Japanese sniper on the afternoon of the first day and was succeeded by Colonel Gerard W. Kelley.

=== Capture of Makin ===
Two days of determined fighting reduced Japanese resistance. After clearing the entire atoll, Smith reported on the morning of 23 November, "Makin taken, recommend command pass to commander garrison force."

The most difficult problem capturing Makin was coordinating the actions of two separate landing forces, made more difficult because the defenders did not respond as anticipated. The unsuitability of the narrow beaches for supply landing operations—which went undiscovered by pre-invasion reconnaissance—was also a severe handicap.

=== Sinking of USS Liscome Bay ===
In the early hours of 24 November the escort carrier and flagship USS Liscome Bay was sunk by the Japanese submarine I-175, which had arrived near Makin just a few hours before. A single torpedo, launched as part of a torpedo spread by I-175, detonated the Liscome Bay's aircraft bomb stockpile, causing an explosion which engulfed the entire ship, causing it to sink quickly. The attack on the Liscome Bay accounted for the majority of American casualties in the Battle of Makin. Of the 916 crewmen of Liscome Bay, 702 perished (54 officers and 648 enlisted men), including the flagship's admiral and task force group commander, Rear Admiral Henry M. Mullinnix, Captain Irving Wiltsie, and Pearl Harbor Navy Cross recipient Cook Second Class Doris Miller.

The loss of the Liscome Bay on the eve of Thanksgiving that year was caused by a few factors. Two destroyers of the destroyer screen, USS Hull and USS Franks, left the destroyer screen, leaving a gap in the screen. Also, the task force which included the Liscome Bay was not zigzagging. The Japanese submarine I-175 approached the task force undetected and fired a spread of torpedoes through the gap in the anti-submarine screen, one of which struck and sank the Liscome Bay.

== Aftermath ==
The complete occupation of Makin took four days and cost considerably more in naval casualties than in ground forces. Despite possessing great superiority in men and weapons, the 27th Division had difficulty subduing the island's small defense force. One Japanese Ha-Go tank was destroyed in combat, and two tanks placed in revetments were abandoned without being used in combat.

Against an estimated 395 Japanese casualties in action during the operation, American ground casualties numbered 66 killed and 152 wounded, representing nearly 1.8 Japanese casualties for every American casualty, although a considerable number of Japanese casualties would have been incurred before the landing, due to naval and aerial bombardment. U.S. Navy losses were significantly higher: 702 deaths on the Liscome Bay, 43 killed in a turret fire on the battleship USS Mississippi, and 10 killed in action with naval shore parties or as aviators, for a total of 755 naval deaths. The overall total of 821 American dead equaled double the number of men in the entire Japanese garrison.

=== In popular culture ===
The Battle of Makin was the subject of the playable campaign mission Semper Fi in the video game Call of Duty: World at War.
