= History of the Southern Pacific Railroad =

The history of the Southern Pacific ("SP") stretched from 1865 to 1998.

The Southern Pacific was represented by three railroads. The original company was called Southern Pacific Railroad, the second was called Southern Pacific Company and the third was called Southern Pacific Transportation Company. The third Southern Pacific railroad, the Southern Pacific Transportation Company, is now operating as the current incarnation of the Union Pacific Railroad.

== Origins ==
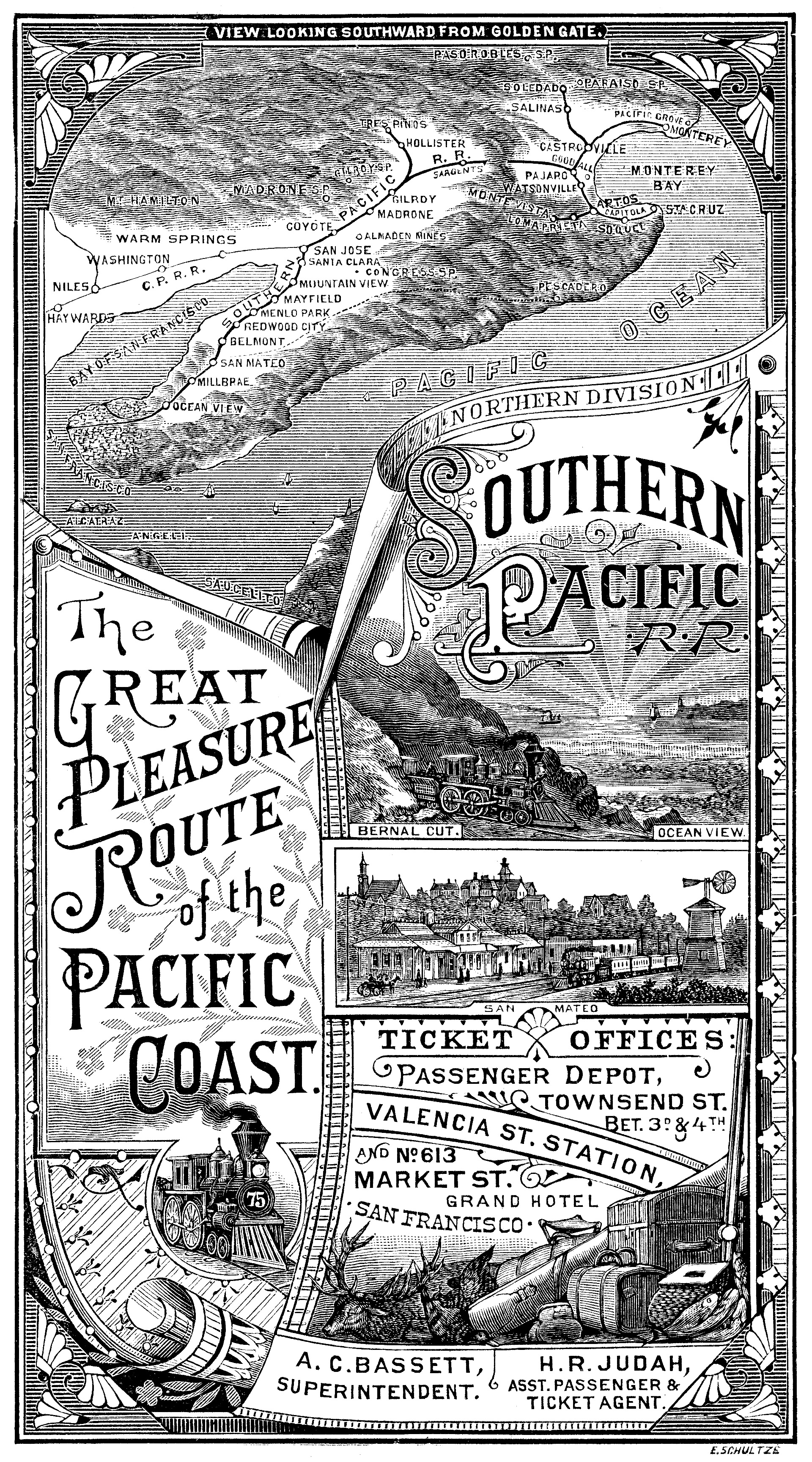
Southern Pacific routes on the Pacific Coast, 1885

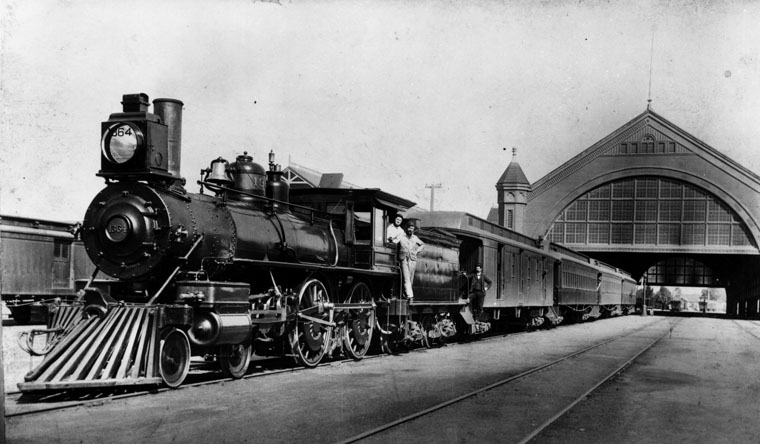
A Southern Pacific train at Los Angeles' Arcade Depot, 1891

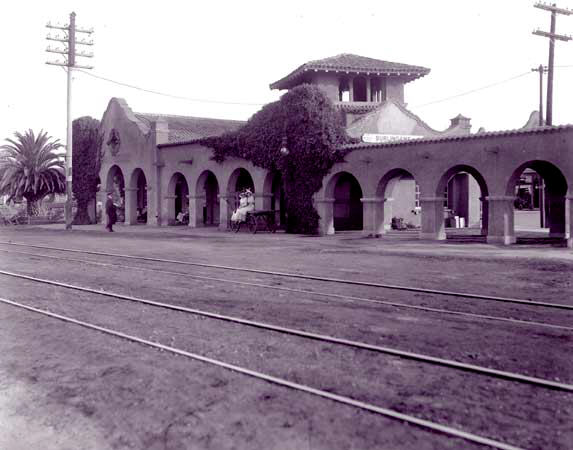
The Southern Pacific depot located in Burlingame, California, c. 1900; completed in 1894 and still in use, it was the first permanent Southern Pacific structure to be constructed in the Mission Revival Style.

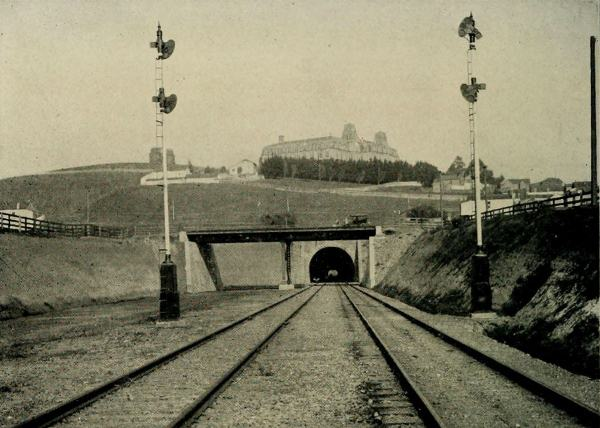
SP tunnel into San Francisco, c. 1900

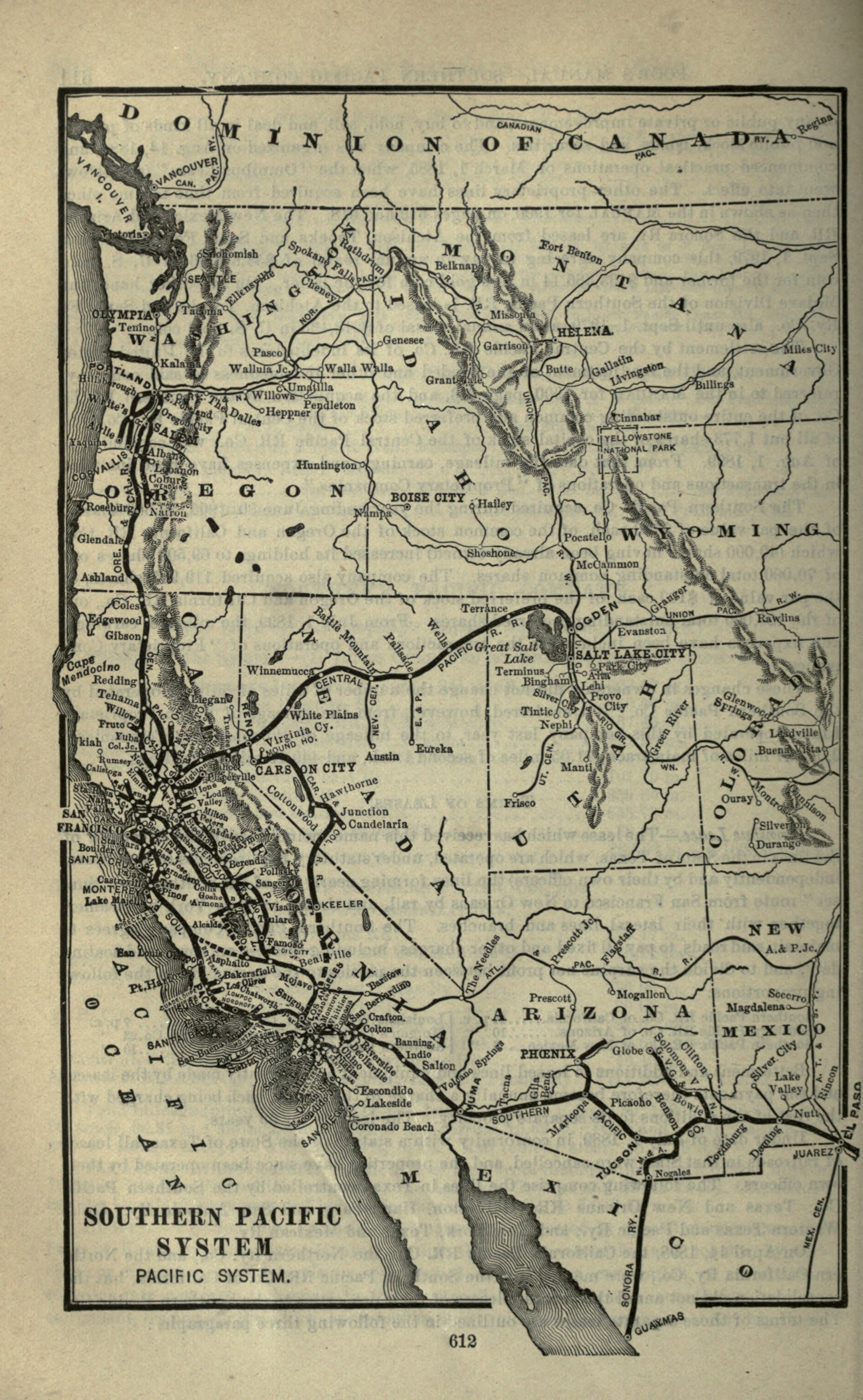
Southern Pacific Company Pacific System in the West, 1901

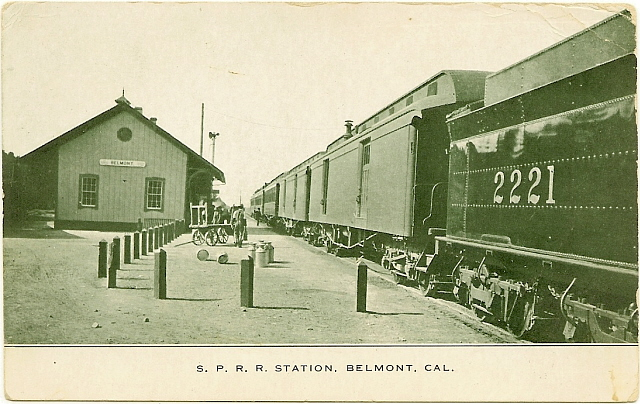
Belmont, California station, c. 1907

One of the original ancestor-railroads of SP, the Galveston and Red River Railway (GRR), was chartered on March 11, 1848, by Ebenezer Allen, although the company did not become active until 1852, after a series of meetings at Chappell Hill, Texas, and Houston, Texas. The original aim was to construct a railroad from Galveston Bay to a point on the Red River near a trading post known as Coffee's Station. Ground was broken in 1853. The GRR built 2 miles (3.2 km) of track in Houston in 1855. Track laying began in earnest in 1856 and on September 1, 1856, GRR was renamed the Houston and Texas Central Railway (H&TC). SP acquired H&TC in 1883 but it continued to operate as a subsidiary under its own management until 1927, when it was leased to another SP-owned railroad, the Texas and New Orleans Railroad.

The Buffalo Bayou, Brazos and Colorado Railway (BBB&C), was chartered in Texas on February 11, 1850, by a group that included General Sidney Sherman. BBB&C was the first railroad to commence operation in Texas and the first component of SP to commence operation. Surveying of the route alignment commenced at Harrisburg, Texas, in 1851 and construction between Houston and Alleyton, Texas, commenced later that year. The first 20 miles (32 km) of track opened in August 1853.

== Southern Pacific Railroad and Southern Pacific Company ==
The original SP was founded in San Francisco in 1865, by a group of businessmen led by Timothy Phelps with the aim of building a rail connection between San Francisco and San Diego, California. The company was purchased in September 1868 by a group of businessmen known as the Big Four: Charles Crocker, Leland Stanford, Mark Hopkins, Jr. and C. P. Huntington. The Big Four had, in 1861, created the Central Pacific Railroad (CPRR).

=== Southern Pacific Railroad and Southern Pacific Company timeline ===
- March 1868: The Southern Pacific acquires the San Francisco and San Jose Railroad.
- March 12, 1873: Railhead is completed south to Tres Pinos, California. This would be the end of the line as the originally-envisioned main line to Coalinga was never built.
- June 1873: The Southern Pacific builds its first locomotive at the railroad's Sacramento shops as CP's second number 55, a 4-4-0.
- Rails reach Soledad, California
- November 8, 1874: Southern Pacific tracks reach Bakersfield, California and work begins on the Tehachapi Loop.
- September 5, 1876: The first through train from San Francisco arrives in Los Angeles, California after traveling over the newly completed Tehachapi Loop.
- February 16, 1877: Before it was the Southern Pacific, the line between Houston and San Antonio was known as the Galveston Harrisburg, & San Antonio line, the GH&SA inaugural run was met along the lines from farms and towns between modern day Houston and San Antonio. The line was originally intended to run to Austin. It was redirected after financial failure and later became part of the SP.
- 1877: Southern Pacific tracks from Los Angeles cross the Colorado River at Yuma, Arizona. Southern Pacific purchases the Houston and Texas Central Railway.
- 1879: Southern Pacific engineers experiment with the first oil-fired locomotives.
- March 20, 1880: The first Southern Pacific train reaches Tucson, Arizona.
- May 11, 1880: The Mussel Slough Tragedy (a dispute over property rights with SP) takes place in Hanford, California.
- 1881: Southern Pacific gains control of the Texas and New Orleans Railroad and the Louisiana Western Railroad.
- May 19, 1881: Southern Pacific tracks reach El Paso, Texas, beating the rival Atchison, Topeka and Santa Fe Railway to El Paso.
- December 15, 1881: Southern Pacific (under the GH&SA RR) meets the Texas and Pacific at Sierra Blanca, Texas in Hudspeth County, Texas getting close to completing the nation's second transcontinental railroad.
- January 12, 1883: The Southern section of the second transcontinental railroad line is completed as the Southern Pacific tracks from Los Angeles meet the Galveston, Harrisburg and San Antonio Railway at a location three miles West of the Pecos River near to Langtry, Texas. The sterling silver spikes were alternatively driven by James Campbell and James Converse with the other driven by Col. Tom Pierce, the GH&SA president. These spikes were thereafter quickly removed. This became the first year round all weather transcontinental railroad. Almost ten years later, March 31, 1892, the Pecos River High Bridge was opened. This moved the line up and out of the Rio Grande Canyon and simplified the alignment. The line now extends to San Antonio and Houston along the Sunset Route.
- March 17, 1884: The Southern Pacific is incorporated in Kentucky.
- February 17, 1885: The Southern Pacific and Central Pacific are combined under a holding company named the Southern Pacific Company.
- April 1, 1885: The Southern Pacific takes over all operation of the Central Pacific. Effectively, the CP no longer exists as a separate company.
- 1886: The first refrigerator cars on the Southern Pacific enter operation; the loading of refrigerator cars with oranges, first performed at Los Angeles, California on February 14, contributed to an economic boom in the famous citrus industry of Southern California, by making deliveries of perishable fruits and vegetables to the eastern United States possible.
- 1886: Southern Pacific wins the landmark Supreme Court case Santa Clara County v. Southern Pacific Railroad which establishes equal rights under the law to corporations.
- 1887: Southern Pacific gains full control of the Oregon and California Railroad giving it a route through northern California all the way across Oregon to Oregon main port city of Portland. However, outright ownership of the railroad wouldn't occur until 1927.
- 1893: Southern Pacific train bandits John Sontag and Chris Evans are apprehended in the Battle of Stone Corral near Visalia, California.
- 1898: Sunset magazine is founded as a promotional tool of the Southern Pacific.
- October 1899: Southern Pacific gains control of the Houston East and West Texas Railway.
- March 31, 1901: Regular service begins along the Coast Line in California.
- 1901: Frank Norris' novel, The Octopus: A California Story, a fictional retelling of the Mussel Slough Tragedy and the events leading up to it, is published.
- July 6, 1901: The Southern Pacific Terminal Company is chartered as an independent operating entity to provide rail service to the Southern Pacific's steamer docks in Galveston, Texas.
- 1901: Union Pacific Railroad acquires control of Southern Pacific. In the following years, many SP operating procedures and equipment purchases follow patterns established by Union Pacific.
- 1903: Southern Pacific gains 50% control of the Pacific Electric system in Los Angeles.
- March 8, 1904: SP opens the Lucin Cutoff across the Great Salt Lake, bypassing Promontory, UT for the railroad's mainline.
- March 20, 1904: The Montalvo cutoff and the Santa Susana Tunnel shorten the Coast Line between Los Angeles and Santa Barbara, CA.
- April 18, 1906: The great 1906 San Francisco earthquake strikes, damaging the railroad's headquarters building and destroying the mansions of the now-deceased Big Four.
- 1906: SP and UP jointly form the Pacific Fruit Express (PFE) refrigerator car line.
- January 8, 1907: With Santa Fe, Southern Pacific forms Northwestern Pacific, unifying several SP- and Santa Fe-owned subsidiaries into one jointly owned railroad serving northwestern California.
- May 22, 1907: The Coast Line Limited of the Southern Pacific Railroad is derailed west of Glendale, California. The accident causes several deaths and injuries, and its cause linked to anarchists.
- 1909: The Southern Pacific of Mexico, the railroad's subsidiary south of the U.S. border, is incorporated.

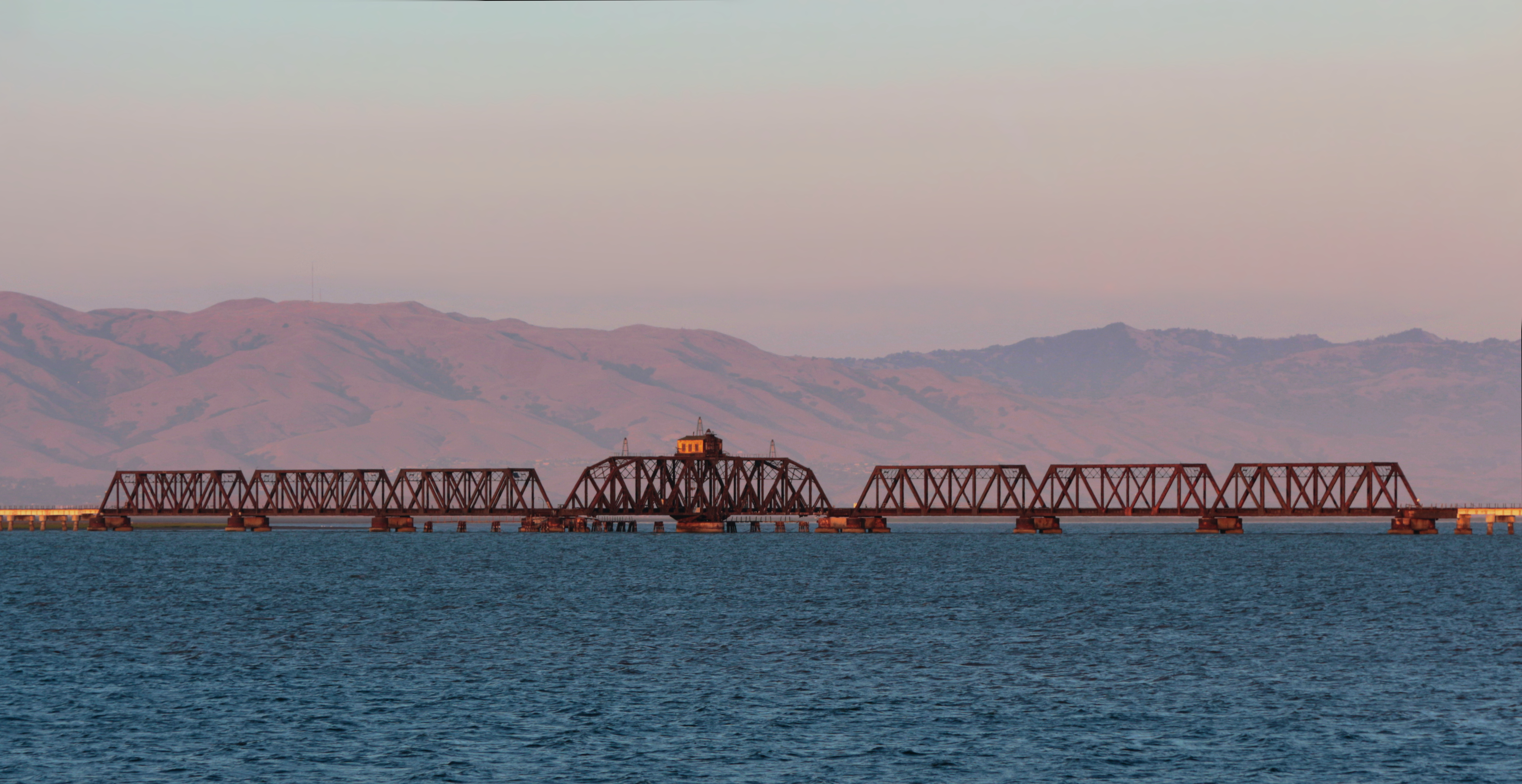
The Dumbarton Rail Bridge

- 1910: The Dumbarton Rail Bridge, the first bridge crossing San Francisco Bay, is completed and inaugurated on September 12.
- 1913: The Supreme Court of the United States orders the Union Pacific to sell all of its stock in the Southern Pacific.
- 1914: Southern Pacific sells Sunset magazine.

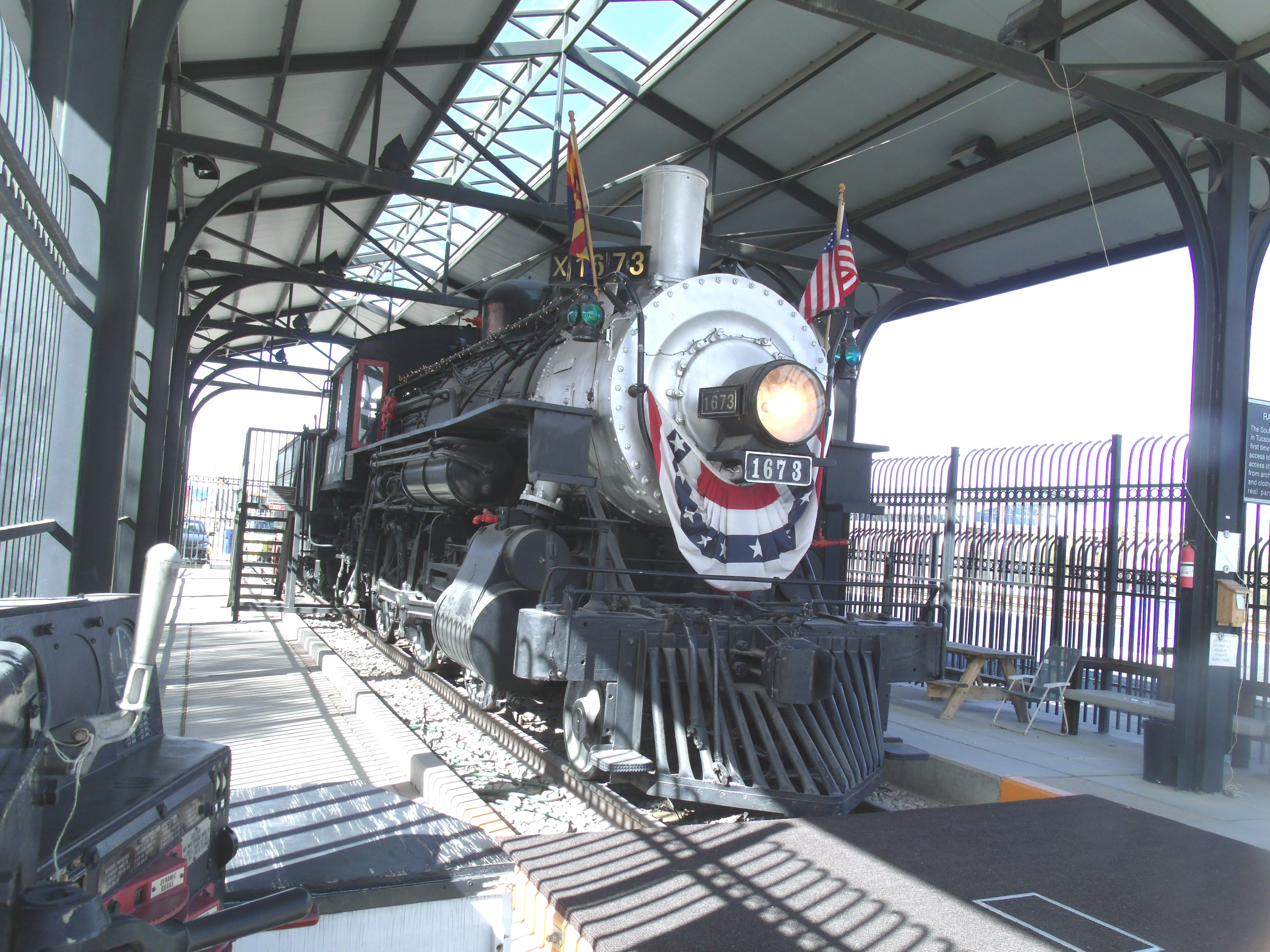
The Southern Pacific Railroad Locomotive No. 1673 is a standard gauge 2-6-0, Mogul type M-4 class, steam locomotive built in 1900 by Schenectady Locomotive Works. It had a brief starring role in the 1954 film Oklahoma, for which it was fitted with a diamond stack and other turn-of-the-century equipment and colors. It was also the star of Southern Pacific's 75th anniversary in Tucson, Arizona. The locomotive is on display in the Southern Arizona Transportation Museum, 414 N. Toole Ave.. It was listed in the National Register of Historic Places on January 9, 1992, ref.: #91001918.

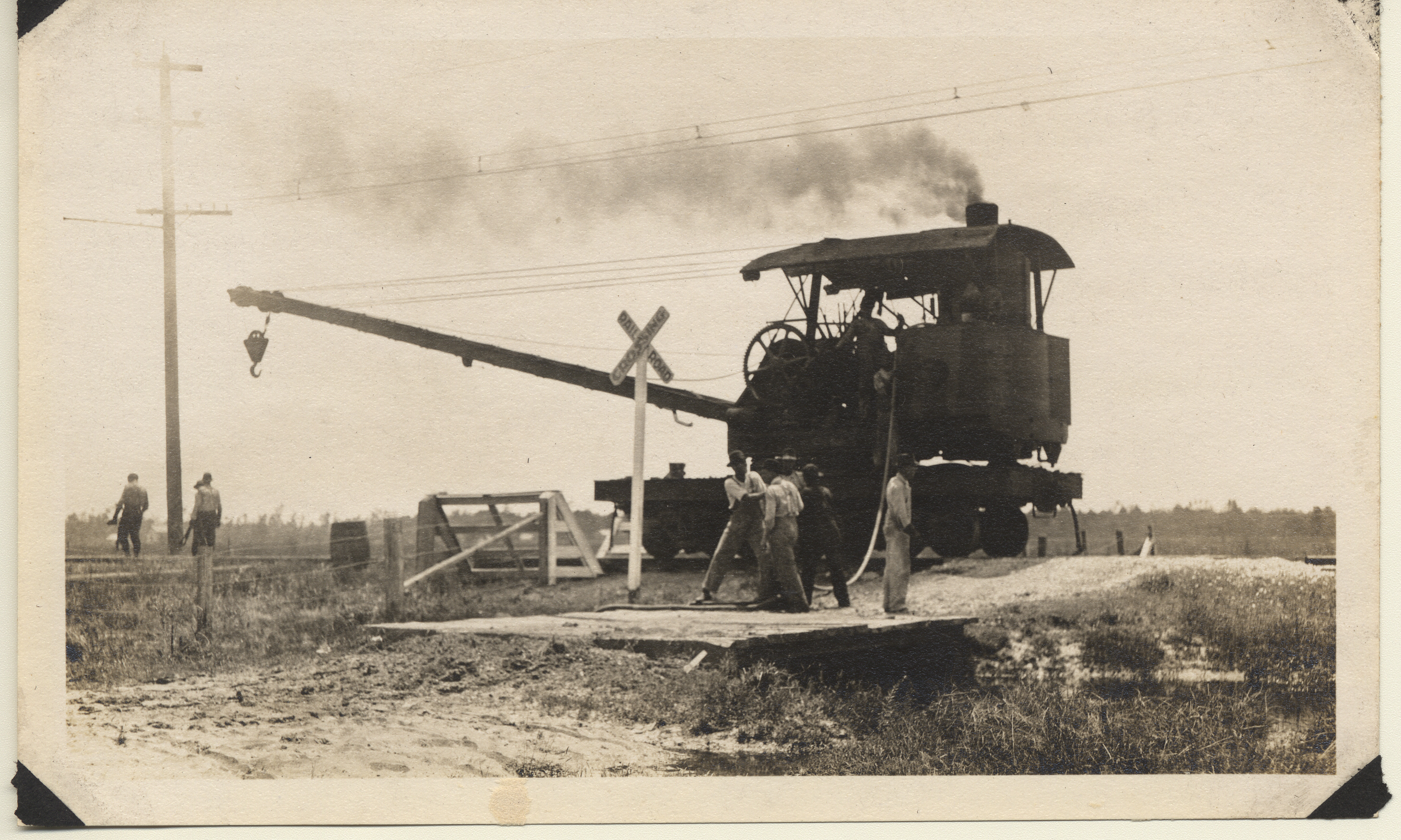
Southern Pacific equipment used to rebuild Galveston after 1915 Hurricane

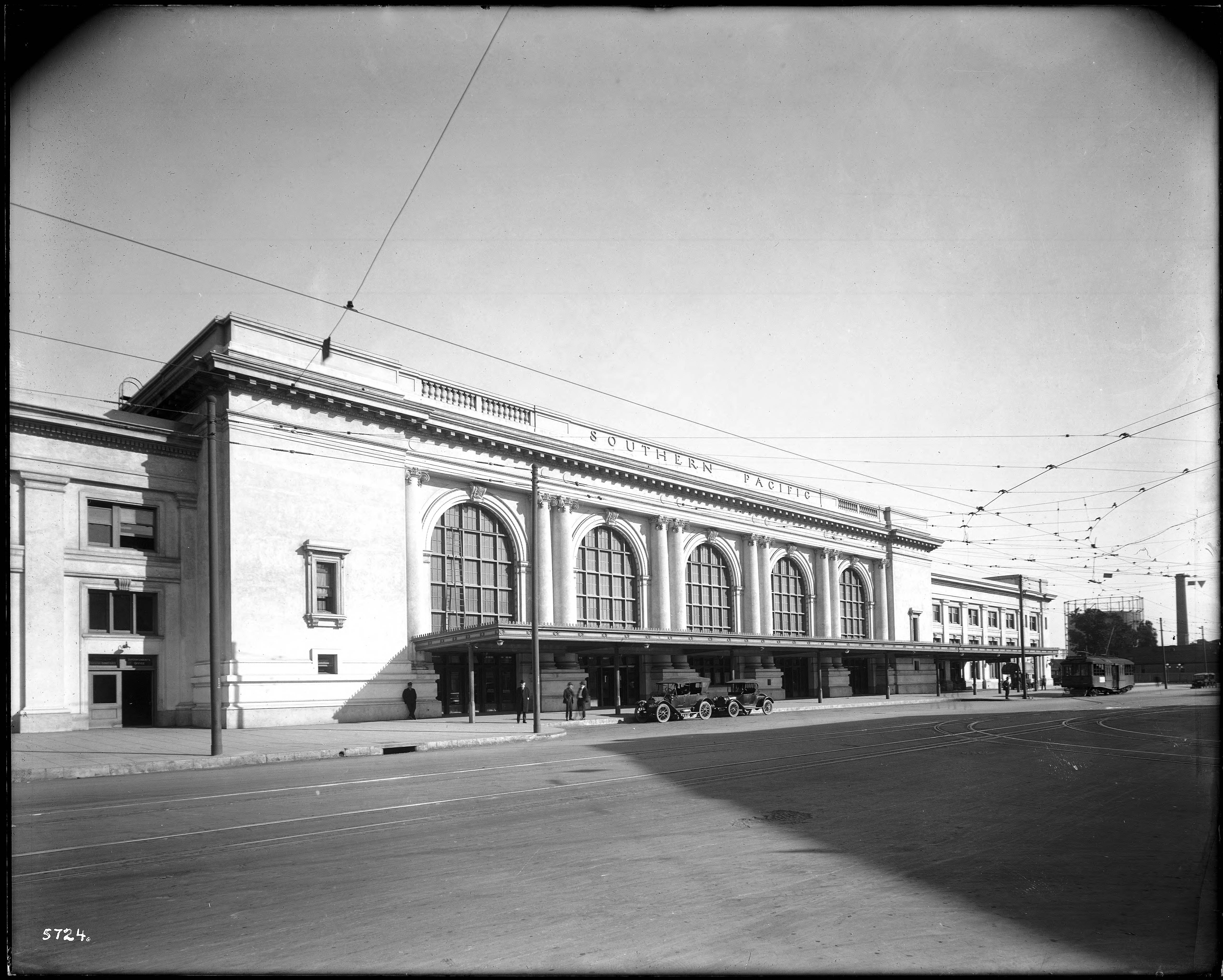
Exterior view of the Southern Pacific's Central Station in Los Angeles c. 1918

- 1917: Southern Pacific moves into its new headquarters in San Francisco at One Market Street
- December 28, 1917: The federal government takes control of American railroads in preparation for World War I
- 1923: The Interstate Commerce Commission allows the SP's control of the Central Pacific to continue, ruling that the control is in the public's interest.
- March 1, 1927: Various Texas and Louisiana SP subsidiaries are leased to the SP-controlled Texas and New Orleans Railroad, including the Galveston, Harrisburg and San Antonio Railway, the Houston and Texas Central Railway, the Houston East and West Texas Railway, the San Antonio and Aransas Pass Railway, and the Southern Pacific Terminal Company.
- 1928: The SP purchases the Texas Midland Railroad and leases the line to the SP-controlled Texas and New Orleans Railroad.
- 1929: Santa Fe sells its interest in Northwestern Pacific to SP. NWP becomes a wholly owned subsidiary of SP.
- 1931: Automatic block signals were added on all Southern Pacific main lines.
- April 14, 1932: The SP gains 87% control of the Cotton Belt Railroad.
- June 30, 1934: All Texas and Louisiana SP subsidiaries previously leased to the SP-controlled Texas and New Orleans Railroad—with the exception of the Southern Pacific Terminal Company—are formally merged with the T&NO, thus creating the largest railroad in Texas, with 3,713 mi (5,975 km) of track.
- May 1939: UP, SP and Santa Fe passenger trains in Los Angeles are united into a single terminal as Los Angeles Union Passenger Terminal opens.
- 1947: The first road diesel locomotives owned solely by SP (i.e., aside from yard switchers) enter operation on the SP. Southern Pacific is reincorporated in Delaware (formerly Kentucky) and entered their first main-line diesel locomotives into service.
- 1951: Southern Pacific subsidiary Southern Pacific of Mexico is sold to the Mexican government.
- 1952: A difficult year for the SP in California opens with the City of San Francisco train marooned for three days in heavy snow on Donner Pass; in July the Kern County earthquake hits Tehachapi pass, closing the line over Tehachapi Loop from 21 July to 15 August.
- 1953: The first Trailer-On-Flat-Car (TOFC, or "piggyback") equipment enters service on the SP.
- January 1957: The last standard gauge steam locomotives in regular operation on the SP are retired; the railroad is now dieselized except for fan excursions.
- 1959: The last revenue steam powered freight is operated on the system by narrow gauge #9.
- 1959: Southern Pacific moved more ton-miles of freight than any other US railroad (the Pennsylvania Railroad had been number one for decades).
- November 1, 1961: The Texas and New Orleans Railroad—which by this time encompassed all of the SP's Texas and Louisiana holdings except for the lines of the Southern Pacific Terminal Company and Cotton Belt—is merged with the Southern Pacific. The SPTC, having been previously leased to the T&NO, is leased to the SP the same day. The SPTC would formally merge with the SP on August 31, 1962.
- 1965: ICC rejects Southern Pacific's bid for control of the Western Pacific.
- 1967: SP opens the longest stretch of new railroad in a quarter century as trains roll over the Palmdale Cutoff through Cajon Pass between Palmdale, California and Colton, California, so that trains could bypass Los Angeles altogether.

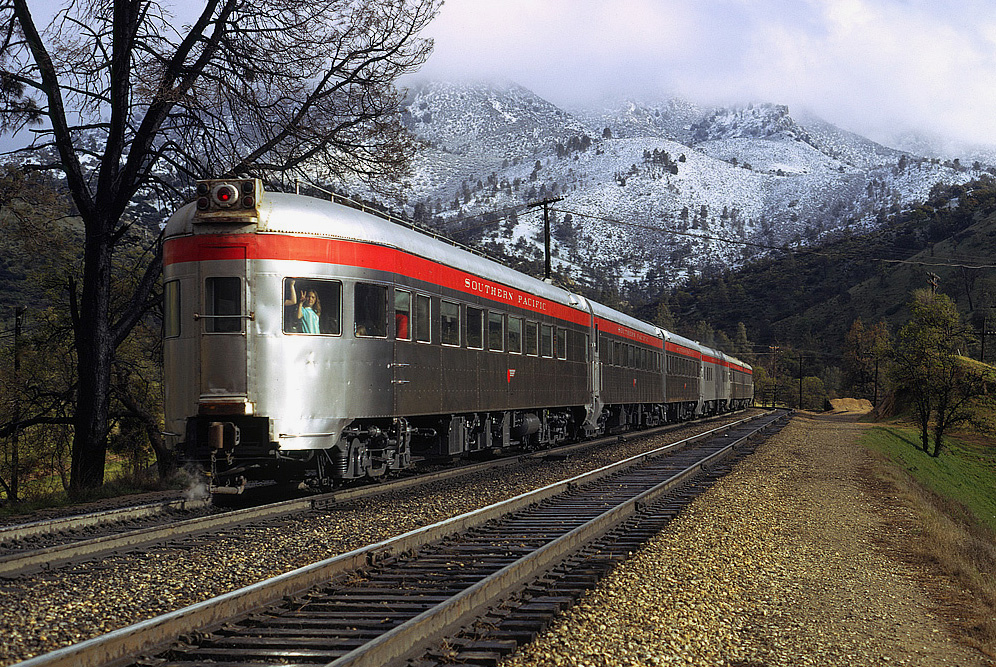
The San Joaquin Daylight, March 1971

== Southern Pacific Transportation Company ==
The Southern Pacific Transportation Company (initials: SPTC, SPTCo and SPT) was established in 1969 and absorbed the Southern Pacific Company, the Southern Pacific Transportation Company becomes the last incarnation of the Southern Pacific railroad. The "Southern Pacific Company" name became available and a new Southern Pacific Company was formed, this time a holding company for the Southern Pacific Transportation Company which replaced the original Southern Pacific Company.

=== Southern Pacific Transportation Company timeline ===
- May 1, 1971: Amtrak takes over long-distance passenger trains in the United States; the only SP revenue passenger trains thereafter were the commutes between San Francisco and San Jose.
- 1972: Southern Pacific Communications began selling surplus capacity on its microwave and fiber optic telecom system (laid along their railroad rights of way) to corporations for use as private lines. This service became part of Sprint (the name coming from the acronym for Southern Pacific Railroad Internal Networking Telephony.)
- 1976: SP is awarded Dow Chemical's first annual Rail Safety Achievement Award in recognition of the railroad's handling of Dow products in 1975.
- 1978: SP entered negotiations with the Seaboard Coast Line Railroad (SCL) for a proposed transcontinental merger, using trackage rights on a railroad SCL controlled, the Louisville and Nashville (L&N). By June, the SCL decided against the merger, but the SP managed to purchase some of SCL's stock.
- 1979: Southern Pacific acquired the title insurance company Ticor
- 1980: Now owning a 98.34% control of the Cotton Belt, the Southern Pacific extends the Cotton Belt from St. Louis to Santa Rosa, New Mexico through acquisition of part of the former Rock Island Railroad.

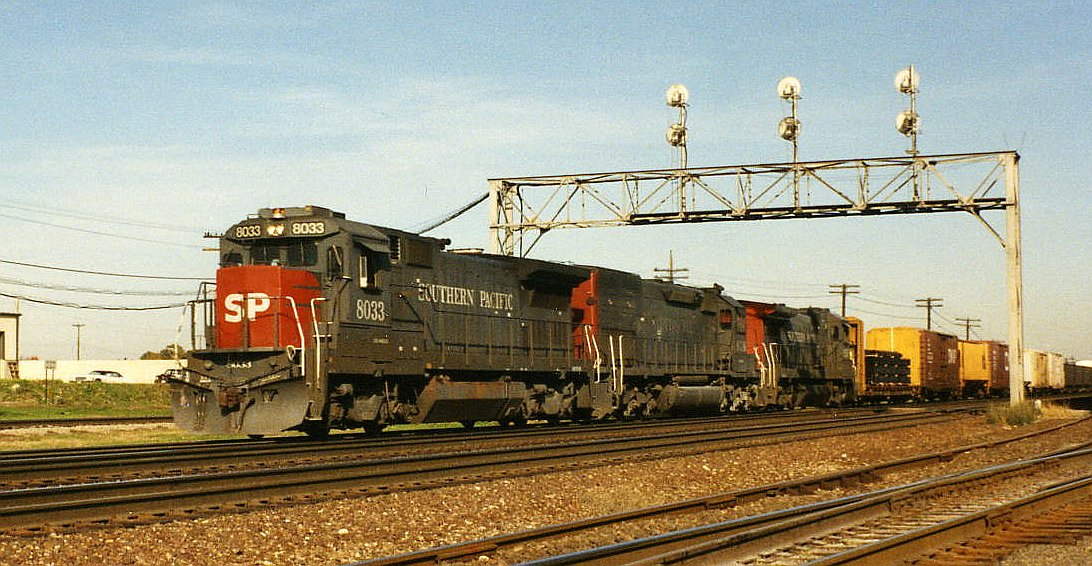
SP 8033, a GE Dash 8-39B, leads a westbound train through Eola, Illinois (just east of Aurora), October 6, 1992.

- 1981: Northern portion of subsidiary Northwestern Pacific sold to independent shortline Eureka Southern Railroad which begins operation on November 1, 1984.
- 1982: Southern Pacific sells its communications arm to GTE
- 1984: The second Southern Pacific Company merges into Santa Fe Industries, parent of the Atchison, Topeka and Santa Fe Railway, to form Santa Fe Southern Pacific Corporation. When the Interstate Commerce Commission refuses permission for the planned merger of the railroad subsidiaries as the Southern Pacific Santa Fe Railroad SPSF shortens its name to Santa Fe Pacific Corporation and puts the Southern Pacific Transportation Company up for sale while retaining the non-rail assets of the second Southern Pacific Company.
- 1984: Santa Fe Southern Pacific sells Ticor.
- 1985: New Caltrain locomotives and rolling stock replace SP equipment on the Peninsula Commute, marking the end of Southern Pacific passenger service with SP equipment.
- 1987: Santa Fe Southern Pacific sold its 520,000 acres of northern California timberland to Sierra Pacific Industries.
- August 9, 1988: the Interstate Commerce Commission approves the purchase of the Southern Pacific Transportation Company by Rio Grande Industries, the company that controlled the Denver and Rio Grande Western Railroad.
- October 13, 1988: Rio Grande Industries takes control of the Southern Pacific Transportation Company. The Southern Pacific Transportation Company and the Denver and Rio Grande Western Railroad did not come together, but the Denver and Rio Grande Western became a subsidiary of the Southern Pacific Transportation Company; this allowed the combined Rio Grande Industries railroad system to operate under the name "Southern Pacific" for all railroad operations while still having the system being represented by two railroads instead of one.
- 1989: Southern Pacific acquires 223 miles of former Alton trackage between St. Louis and Joliet from the Chicago, Missouri & Western. For the first time the Southern Pacific served the Chicago area on its own rails.
- March 17, 1991: The Southern Pacific changes its corporate image, replacing the century-old Roman Lettering with the Rio Grande-inspired Speed Lettering.
- 1992: Northwestern Pacific is merged into SP, ending NWP's existence as a corporate subsidiary of SP and leaving the Cotton Belt as SP's only remaining major railroad subsidiary. The Northwestern Pacific's south end would eventually be sold off by UP and turned into a "new" Northwestern Pacific.
- 1996-1998: The Union Pacific Corporation finishes the acquisition that was effectively begun almost a century before with the purchase of the original Southern Pacific railroad by the Union Pacific Railroad in 1901, until divestiture was ordered in 1913.

== Southern Pacific history revenue tables ==
Revenue Freight Ton-Miles (Millions)
| | SP | T&NO | SSW | Texas Midland | Dayton-Goose Creek | Lake Tahoe Ry and Transp |
|---|---|---|---|---|---|---|
| 1925 | 10,569 | 4,097 | 1,475 | 27 | 15 | 0.05 |
| 1933 | 6,138 | 2,114 | 1,049 | (into T&NO) | (into T&NO) | (into SP) |
| 1944 | 29,877 | 10,429 | 6,243 | | | |
| 1960 | 33,280 | 10,192 | 4,750 | | | |
| 1970 | 64,988 | (merged SP) | 8,650 | | | |

Revenue Passenger-Miles (Millions)
| | SP | T&NO | SSW | Texas Midland | Dayton-Goose Creek | Lake Tahoe Ry and Transp |
|---|---|---|---|---|---|---|
| 1925 | 1,580 | 416 | 75 | 2 | 0.2 | 0.2 |
| 1933 | 869 | 116 | 10 | (into T&NO) | (into T&NO) | (into SP) |
| 1944 | 6,592 | 1,519 | 227 | | | |
| 1960 | 1,069 | 128 | 0 | | | |
| 1970 | 339 | (merged SP) | 0 | | | |

In the tables "SP" does not include NWP, P&SR, SD&AE, PE, Holton Inter-Urban, Visalia Electric (except 1970 includes PE, which merged into SP in 1965; it reported 104 million ton-miles in 1960). "T&NO" total for 1925 includes GH&SA, H&TC, SA&AP and the other roads that folded into T&NO a couple years later. "SSW" includes SSW of Texas.

1971 Moody's shows route-mileage operated as of 31 December 1970: 11615 SP, 1565 SSW, 324 NWP, 136 SD&AE, 44 T&T, 34 VE, 30 P&SR and 10 HI-U. SP operated 18337 miles of track.

== Morgan Line and the Sunset–Gulf Route ==
Southern Pacific system as of 1918

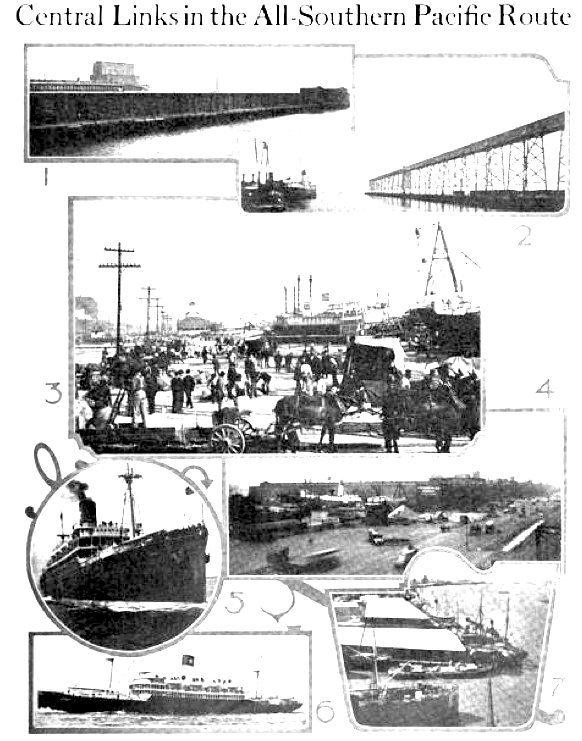
Captions read: 1) Southern Pacific docks at Galveston, Texas, 2) Grain carriers and ships at Galveston, 3) Unloading sugar at New Orleans, 4) Southern Pacific docks at New York City, 5) The Southern Pacific steamer Creole, 6) The S.S. Momus entering New York Bay, 7) West end of the docks at Galveston

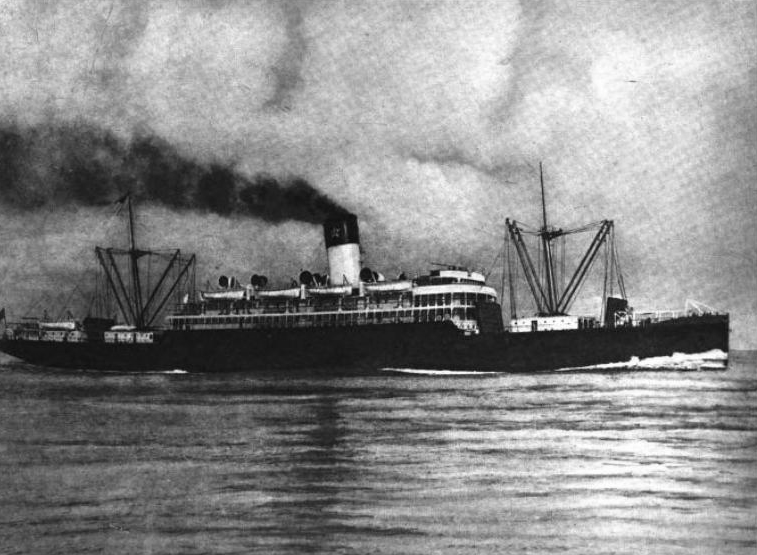
Passenger steamer Antilles.

Southern Pacific's Atlantic Steamship Lines, known in operation as the Morgan Line, provided a link between the western rail system through Galveston with freight and New Orleans with both freight and passenger service to New York. In 1915 the New York terminus in the North River included piers 49–52 at the foot of 11th Street.

The steamer service and later operating name began with a small fleet of side wheel steamers owned by Charles Morgan operating out of Gulf ports and later extending to New York. That line was bought by the Morgans, Louisiana & Texas Railroad & Steamship Company that became part of the Southern Pacific system with Pacific Coast to New York service under single management begun February 1, 1883. The Morgan Line, by 1900, had been operating from New Orleans to Cuba for over thirty years and as a result of the war with Spain benefited with the increased trade. Southern Pacific claimed Morgan's blue flag with a white star and red-hulled ships were as familiar to Cubans as the lions of Castile as it advertised its new freighters El Norte, El Sud, El Rio as they plied between the company's wharves at Algiers to Havana by way of Key West. By 1899 the company was noting that the railway system, stretching from the Columbia River to the Gulf of Mexico, in conjunction with its steamship lines stretched from New Orleans to New York, Havana and Central American ports and with its Pacific service from San Francisco to Honolulu, Yokohama, Hong Kong and Manila.

In a 1912 report to the United States Senate the Special Commissioner on Panama Traffic and Tolls reported the Southern Pacific's "Sunset—Gulf Route" enabled the line to be the only railroad to control a route between the Atlantic and Pacific Seaboards. The other railroads serving the Pacific Coast largely ran from the Midwest with only one other, the American-Hawaiian Steamship Company competing directly with ships serving Hawaii and the Pacific Coast transshipping cargo and passengers across the Isthmus of Tehuantepec by the Tehuantepec National Railway to meet its ships running to New York. Southern Pacific, using that route under single corporate management, began "active warfare" against its competitors securing a large share of the coast to coast traffic. In 1909 the lines rates were equal to the all rail rates of other railroad lines through a system in which the line absorbed costs getting freight from interior Eastern origins to New York and shipping via the water—rail route that took an average time of fifteen days, five hours.

Five of the line's new ships were among the first six built by the new shipyard at Newport News, Virginia that became Newport News Shipbuilding and the contracts were instrumental in the early success of the company. All five, the tug El Toro and the liners El Sol, El Norte, El Sud and El Rio, were taken by the Navy as a Navy tug and as cruisers for the Spanish–American War. The ships were not returned requiring new construction and temporarily crippling the line. Another, El Cid completed in 1893 was sold to Brazil. Ships were leased and in 1899—1901 a new group built including some of the previous name: El Norte, El Dia, El Sud, El Cid, El Rio, El Valle, El Alba, El Siglo and others with a new El Sol built in 1910 along with three others of the same type. Again war took ships, even newly constructed ones such as El Capitan, and the passenger ship Antilles. By 1921 the fleet consisted of five passenger ships, seventeen freighters and two tank ships with more being constructed.

== Ferry service ==
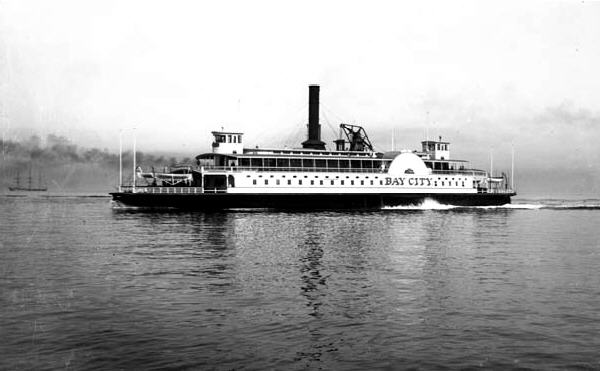
The Southern Pacific Company's Bay City ferry plies the waters of San Francisco Bay in the late 19th century

The Central Pacific Railroad (and later the Southern Pacific) maintained and operated a fleet of ferry boats that connected Oakland with San Francisco by water. For this purpose, a massive pier, the Oakland Long Wharf, was built out into San Francisco Bay in the 1870s which served both local and mainline passengers. Early on, the Central Pacific gained control of the existing ferry lines for the purpose of linking the northern rail lines with those from the south and east; during the late 1860s the company purchased nearly every bayside plot in Oakland, creating what author and historian Oscar Lewis described as a "wall around the waterfront" that put the town's fate squarely in the hands of the corporation. Competitors for ferry passengers or dock space were ruthlessly run out of business, and not even stage coach lines could escape the group's notice, or wrath.

By 1930, the Southern Pacific owned the world's largest ferry fleet (which was subsidized by other railroad activities), carrying 40 million passengers and 60 million vehicles annually aboard 43 vessels. The Southern Pacific had also established ferry service across the Mississippi River between Avondale and Harahan, Louisiana and in New Orleans by 1932. However, the opening of the Huey P. Long Bridge in 1935 and the San Francisco–Oakland Bay Bridge in 1936 initiated the slow decline in demand for ferry service, and by 1951 only 6 ships remained active. Mississippi River service ceased by 1953 and SP ferry service was discontinued altogether in 1958.

== Predecessor and subsidiary railroads ==
=== Arizona ===
- Arizona Eastern Railroad 1910–1955
  - Arizona Eastern Railroad Company of New Mexico 1904–1910
  - Arizona and Colorado Railroad 1902–1910
  - Gila Valley, Globe and Northern Railway 1894–1910 later AZER
  - Maricopa and Phoenix Railroad (of 1907) 1908–1910
    - Maricopa and Phoenix and Salt River Valley Railroad 1895–1908
      - Maricopa and Phoenix Railroad 1887–1895
        - Arizona Central Railroad 1881–1887
      - Phoenix, Tempe and Mesa Railway 1894–1895
  - Arizona and Colorado Railroad Company of New Mexico 1904–1910
- El Paso and Southwestern Railroad
  - Arizona and New Mexico Railway 1883–1935
    - Clifton and Southern Pacific Railway 1883 (Narrow Gauge)
    - Clifton and Lordsburg Railway
  - Arizona and South Eastern Railroad 1888–1902
  - Mexico and Colorado Railroad 1908–1910
  - Southwestern Railroad of Arizona 1900–1901
  - Southwestern Railroad of New Mexico 1901–1902
- New Mexico and Arizona Railroad 1882–1897 ATSF Subsidiary, 1897–1934 Non-operating SP subsidiary
- Phoenix and Eastern Railroad 1903–1934
- Tucson and Nogales Railroad 1910–1934
  - Twin Buttes Railroad 1906–1929; Tucson-Sahuarita line sold to above in 1910. Sahuarita-Twin Buttes line scrapped in 1934.

=== California ===
- Inter-California Railway (California to Baja California)
- California Pacific Railroad (Vallejo, California to Sacramento, California)
- Central Pacific Railroad
- Interurban Electric Railway
- Los Angeles & San Pedro Railroad
- Northern Railway
- Northwestern Pacific Railroad
- Oregon and California Railroad
- Pacific Electric Railway
- Sacramento Southern Railroad
- San Diego and Arizona Railway
- San Diego and Arizona Eastern Railway
- San Francisco and San Jose Rail Road
- South Pacific Coast Railroad
- Ventura and Ojai Valley Railroad
- Visalia Electric Railroad
- Western Pacific Railroad (1862-1870) (San Jose, California to Sacramento, California)
- West Side and Mendocino Railroad (Willows, California to Fruto, California)

=== New Mexico ===
- El Paso and Southwestern Railroad
- El Paso and Northeastern Railway

=== Oregon ===
- Oregon and California Railroad 1869–1927
  - Oregon Central Railroad 1867–1870
- Portland Traction Company, owned jointly with Union Pacific Railroad and operated independently 1962–1989 Portland, Oregon to Oregon City, Oregon and Boring, Oregon

=== Texas ===
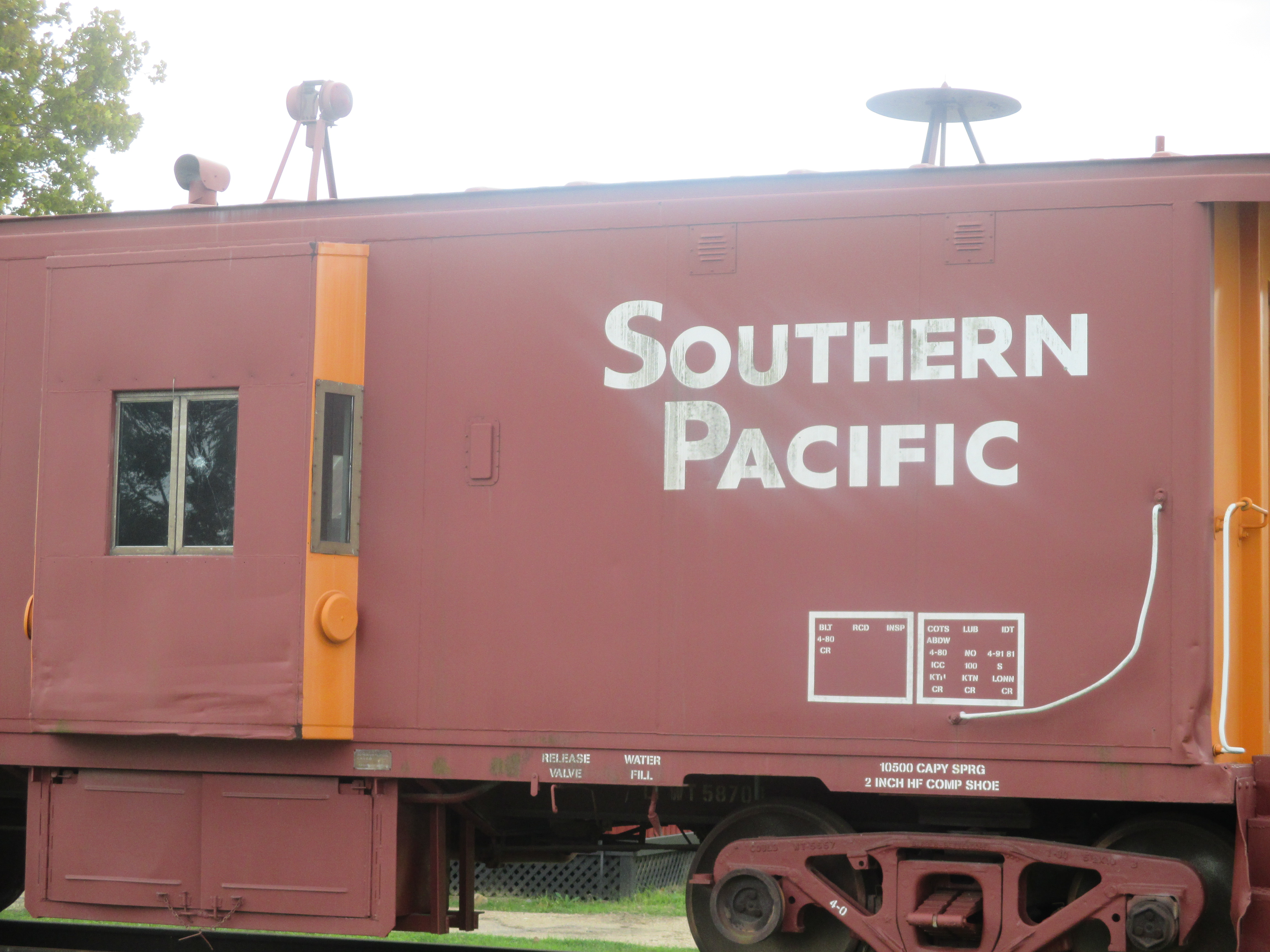
Former Southern Pacific railway caboose on exhibit in Flatonia, west of Houston, Texas

- Austin and Northwestern Railroad
- Galveston, Harrisburg and San Antonio Railway
- Houston East and West Texas Railway
- Houston and Texas Central Railroad
- San Antonio and Aransas Pass Railway, downgraded to secondary status in favor of San Antonio, Uvalde and Gulf Railroad
- Southern Pacific Terminal Company
- Texas Midland Railroad
- Texas and New Orleans Railroad
- El Paso and Northeastern Railway
- El Paso and Southwestern Railroad

=== Mexico ===
- Southern Pacific of Mexico
- Inter-California Railway (California to Baja California)

== Successor railroads ==
=== Arizona ===
- Arizona Eastern Railway (AZER) since 1988 from SP
- San Pedro and Southwestern Railroad (SPSR) from SWKR, since 2003
  - San Pedro and Southwestern Railway (SWKR) from SP, 1994–2003

=== Louisiana ===
- Louisiana and Delta Railroad (LDRR) since 1987

=== California ===
- California Northern Railroad
- Eureka Southern Railroad
- Napa Valley Wine Train
- Niles Canyon Railway
- North Coast Railroad (now part of the Northwestern Pacific Railroad)
- San Diego and Imperial Valley Railroad
- San Joaquin Valley Railroad
- Santa Cruz, Big Trees and Pacific Railway

=== Oregon ===
- Oregon Pacific Railroad
- Port of Tillamook Bay Railroad
- Central Oregon and Pacific Railroad
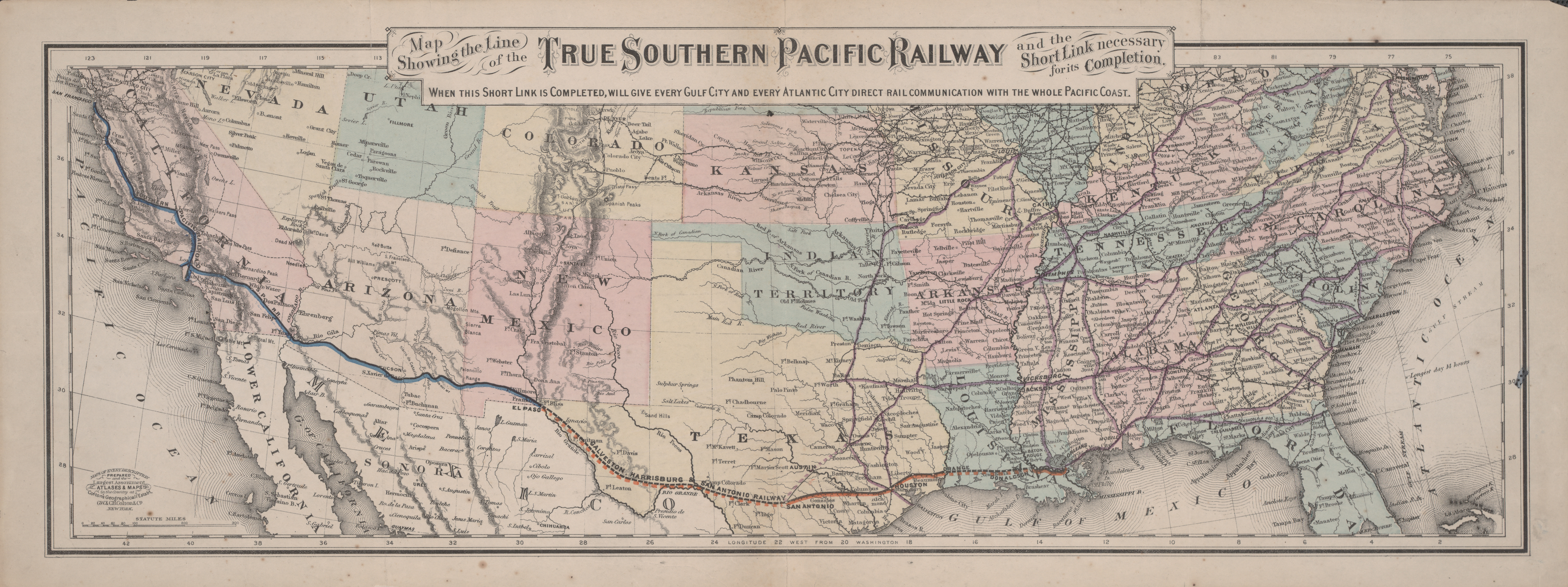
G. W. & C. B. Colton, Map Showing the Line of the True Southern Pacific Railway, c. 1881

== Bibliography ==
- Beale, Edwin I. (1907). Highways & Byways of the Virginia Peninsula. Newport News, Virginia: E. I. Beale. LCCN 07009602.
- Colton, T. (May 2, 2014). "Newport News Shipbuilding, Newport News VA". ShipbuildingHistory. Archived from the original on October 26, 2014.
- Daggett, Stuart (1922). Chapters on the History of the Southern Pacific.
- Johnson, Emory R. (1912). The Relation of the Panama Canal to the Traffic and Rates of American Railroads. United States Senate Reports. Washington, D.C.: United States Government Printing Office.
- Jungen, C. W. (1922). "Ocean Unit of Lines That Span Continent". Southern Pacific Bulletin. 11 (January 1922). San Francisco: Southern Pacific.
- Mayo, H. M. (1900). "Cuba and the Way There". Sunset. 4 (January, 1900). San Francisco: Passenger Department Southern Pacific Company: 95–98.
- Solomon, Brian (2005). Southern Pacific Passenger Trains. Voyageur Press. ISBN 9781610605076.
- Yenne, Bill (1996). The History of the Southern Pacific. New York, New York: Smithmark Pub. ISBN 0-8317-3788-3.
- Woodman, E. H., ed. (1899). "Transportation". Sunset. 2 (March, 1899). San Francisco: Passenger Department Southern Pacific Company.
