= John Greenslade =

US Navy officer (1880–1950)

John Wills Greenslade
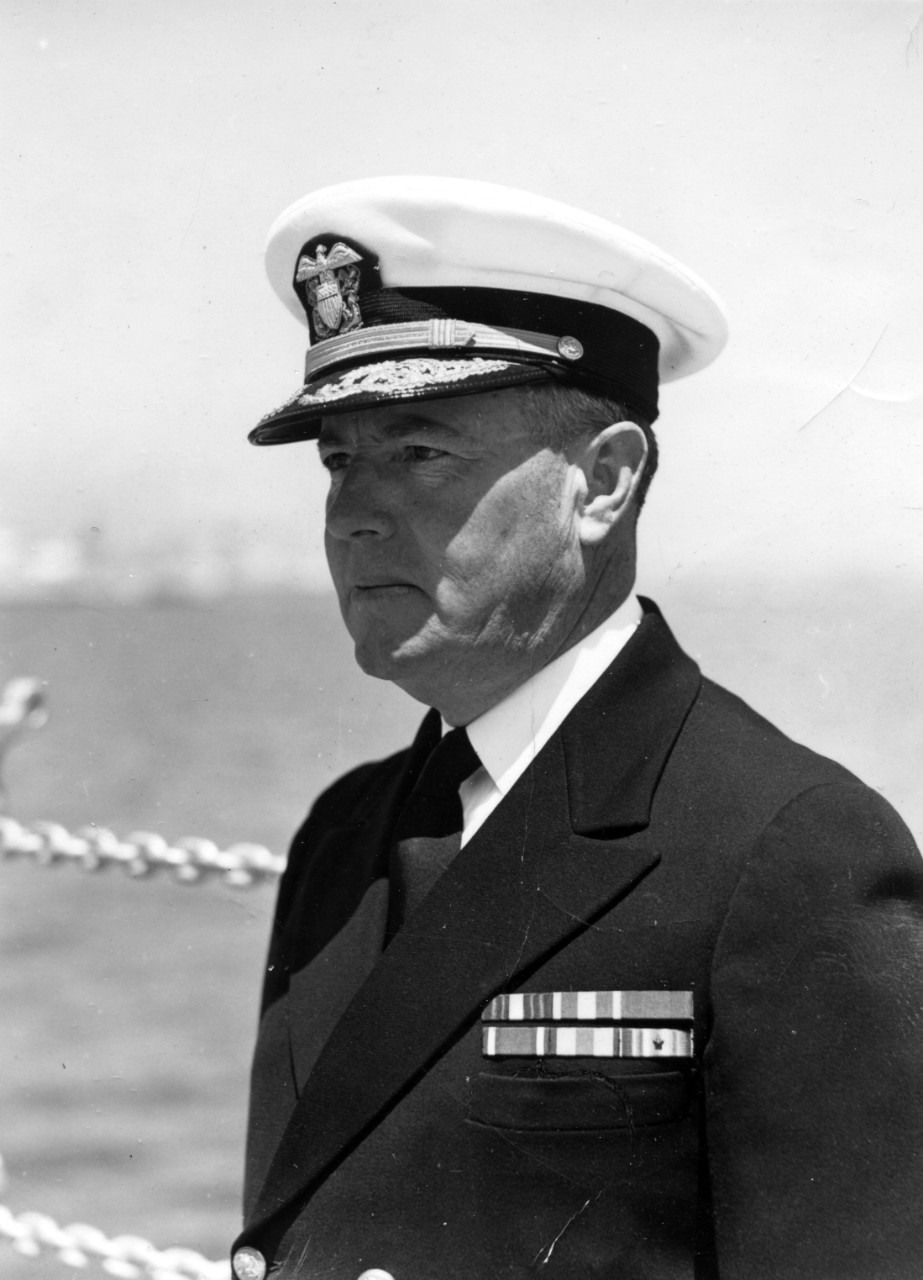
- VADM John W. Greenslade, USN
- Born: January 11, 1880; Bellevue, Ohio, US
- Died: January 6, 1950 (aged 69); Bellevue, Ohio, US
- Burial place: United States Naval Academy Cemetery
- Relatives: RADM John F. Greenslade (son)
- Military career
- Allegiance: United States of America
- Branch: United States Navy
- Service years: 1899–1945
- Rank: Vice Admiral
- Service number: 0-2969
- Commands: Western Sea Frontier; Twelfth Naval district USS Pennsylvania; USS Galveston; USS Housatonic; USS Paducah
- Conflicts: Spanish–American War; Philippine–American War; Cuban Pacification; Veracruz Expedition; World War I: North Sea Mine Barrage; World War II
- Awards: Distinguished Service Medal (2); Legion of Merit

John Wills Greenslade (January 11, 1880 – January 6, 1950) was a highly decorated officer in the United States Navy with the rank of vice admiral. He enjoyed a significant military career, participating in several conflicts and distinguished himself during World War I as commanding officer, USS Housatonic and during World War II as commander, Western Sea Frontier and commandant, Twelfth Naval district with headquarters at Mare Island Naval Shipyard.

During World War II, Greenslade stirred up controversy, during his service at Mare Island Naval Shipyard, when urged that American-born and alien Japanese be excluded from areas of strategic importance. On April 17, 1942, the Navy seized Treasure Island, San Francisco, California, from the City of San Francisco under the direction of Vice Admiral Greenslade, and paid no compensation for the confiscated island. Admiral Greenslade claimed Treasure Island was required for "national security" and appropriated the island for the Navy.

== Early career ==
John W. Greenslade was born on January 11, 1880, in Bellevue, Ohio, as the son of merchant and farmer, John Henry Greenslade and Nellie Wills. He graduated from the Bellevue High School in his hometown in summer 1895 and received an appointment to the United States Naval Academy at Annapolis, Maryland. While at the academy, Greenslade reached the rank of Cadet-Ensign was active as Coxswain in the Crew team and was nicknamed "Babe" by fellow Midshipmen.

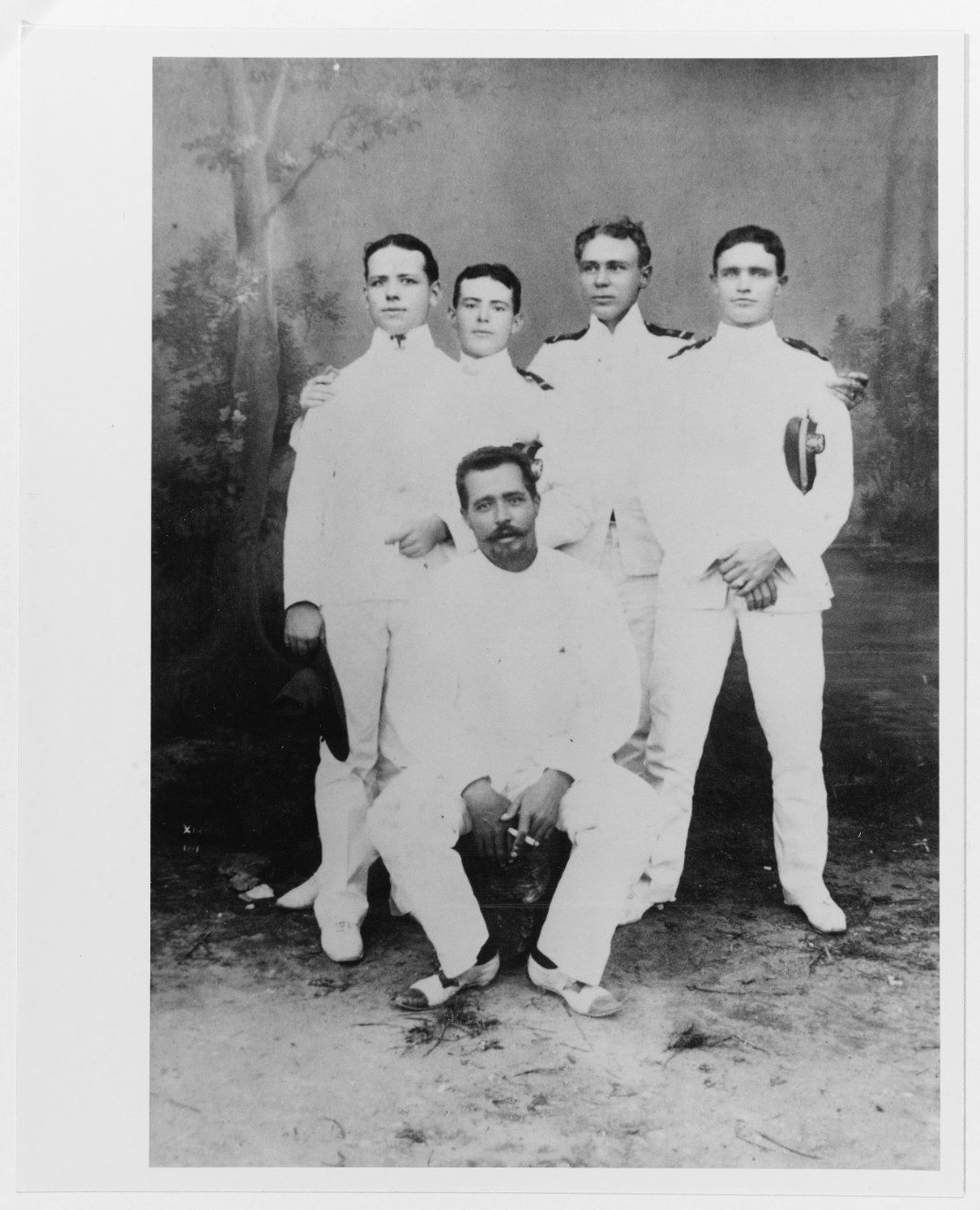
Greenslade (second from left) with Officers at Iloilo, Philippine Islands, January 1900.

Among his classmates were future admirals such as Claude C. Bloch, Harry L. Brinser, Cyrus W. Cole, Charles E. Courtney, Frederick J. Horne, Alfred Wilkinson Johnson, Edward C. Kalbfus, Henry E. Lackey, Edgar B. Larimer, Joseph K. Taussig, Adolphus E. Watson and Clark H. Woodward.

While in his junior year, Greenslade served as Midshipman during Spanish–American War and took part in the naval blockade of Havana, Cuba aboard cruiser USS Montgomery. He graduated as Passed Midshipman in August 1898 with Bachelor of Science degree and was attached to the gunboat USS Concord, operating along the coast of Bataan, Philippines during the Philippine–American War. Greenslade was commissioned ensign on January 28, 1901, after completing two years at sea, required then by law.

In summer 1902, Greenslade served aboard gunboat USS Princeton until May 1903, when he was appointed 12-inch-turret officer aboard the battleship USS Texas under Captain William T. Swinburne. Greenslade participated in the patrols in North Atlantic until July 1904. when he was transferred back to the United States Naval Academy for duty as an instructor in the Department of Physics and Chemistry. While in this capacity, he taught several future World War II admirals including Chester Nimitz, Royal E. Ingersoll, John H. Newton, Aubrey W. Fitch, Frank J. Fletcher, Robert L. Ghormley, John S. McCain Sr., John H. Towers and Russell Willson.

Greenslade was promoted to lieutenant on January 1, 1905, and was transferred to the protected cruiser USS Cleveland in September 1906. He served as ship's navigator and took part in the Cuban Pacification several weeks later, when he commanded a landing force at Cienfuegos, Cuba. Greenslade then assumed command of gunboat USS Paducah and commanded this vessel during the patrol in the Caribbean until December 1908.

He was subsequently attached to the battleship USS Maine and served as senior Watch officer under Captain William B. Caperton until August 1909, when he was ordered back to the United States Naval Academy for his second tour as an instructor in the Department of Physics and Chemistry. Greenslade was transferred to the battleship USS Michigan in June 1911 and served consecutively as ordnance officer and navigator for next three years. During the Veracruz Expedition, he led Michigan landing battalion ashore. He was promoted to lieutenant commander on March 4, 1911.

== World War I ==
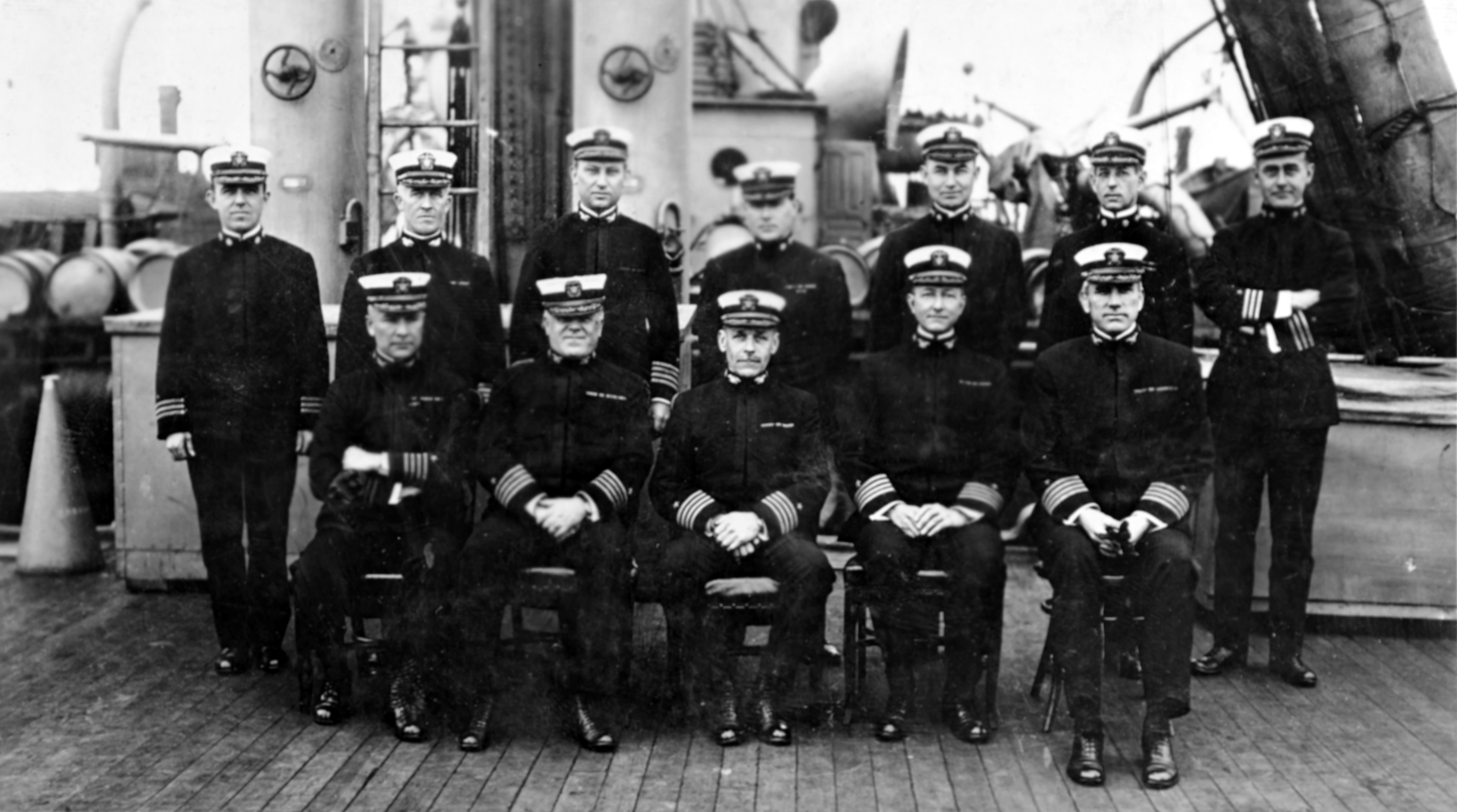
Officers of Mine Squadron One in September 1918. Greenslade standing center in the back row.

Greenslade began his third tour of duty at the United States Naval Academy in January 1915, when he rejoined the Department of Physics and Chemistry as an Instructor and following his promotion to commander on August 29, 1916, he was appointed Head of the Department of Gunnery and Ordnance. He remained in that capacity for one year and subsequently was ordered to Washington, D.C., where he joined the staff of the United States Naval Institute as a secretary and treasurer. While in this capacity, Greenslade authored Landing Force Manual, which was adopted by the Navy in 1918.

He served in this capacity until the end of January 1918, when he assumed command of newly commissioned minelayer USS Housatonic at Bethlehem Shipbuilding Corporation in Hoboken, New Jersey. Greenslade embarked with his ship for Europe and carried 830 mines, which Housatonic planted within North Sea Mine Barrage between June and October 1918. The objective was to inhibit the movement of U-boats from bases in Germany to the Atlantic shipping lanes bringing supplies to the British Isles. Greenslade was decorated with Navy Distinguished Service Medal for his wartime service and was promoted to the temporary rank of captain on July 1, 1918.

== Interwar period ==
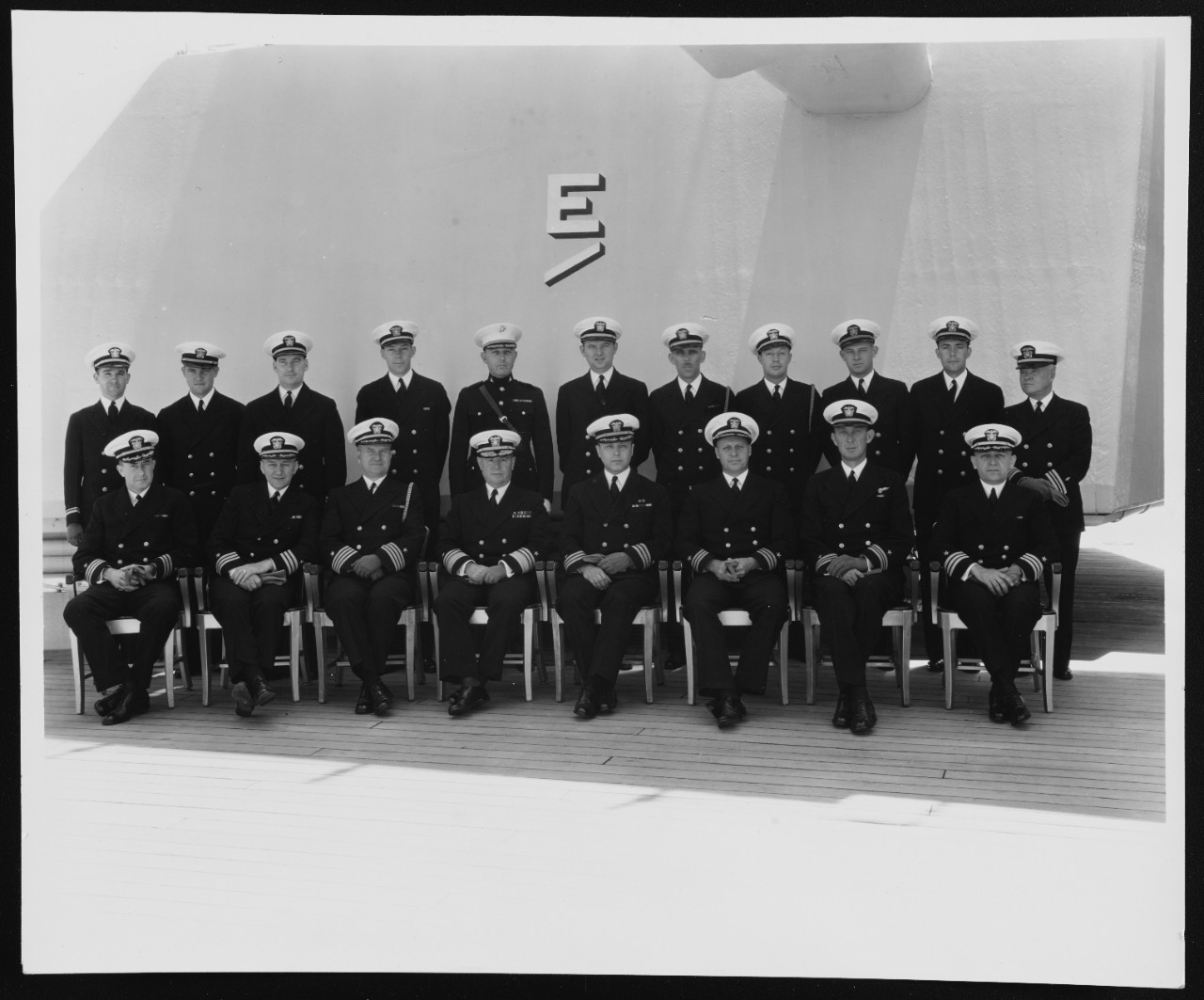
Greenslade (seated, fourth from left) with the staff of Battleships, Battle Force, U.S. Fleet.

Greenslade in civilian clothes in late 1930s.

Greenslade was appointed commanding officer of protected cruiser USS Galveston in March 1919 and participated in the transports of British-American troops from Harwich to Murmansk, USSR as part of Allied intervention in the Russian Civil War there. The Galveston was then transferred to the Black Sea and took part in the evacuation of refugees American Red Cross officials from Novorossiysk and Feodosia to Constantinopol.

In March 1920, Greenslade was ordered to the Indian Head, Maryland, where he was appointed inspector of naval ordnance and officer-in-charge of the Naval Proving Ground and Naval Powder Factory. He served in this capacity until June 1923, when he was appointed commander of Mine Squadron 1, United States Fleet, operating in the Atlantic. Greenslade was ordered to the Naval War College at Newport, Rhode Island, in July 1925, where he completed Senior course one year later. He was subsequently attached to the staff of the Naval War College under Rear Admiral William V. Pratt as operations officer.

By the end of June 1928, Greenslade was ordered to San Francisco, California, where he assumed command of USS Pennsylvania operating with the Pacific Fleet. He served aboard Pennsylvania until May 1929, when he was appointed chief of staff of the Battleship Division, United States Fleet, under Rear Admiral Lucius A. Bostwick. Greenslade was ordered to Washington, D.C., in December 1930 and appointed a member of the General Board of the Navy.

Greenslade was promoted to rear admiral on May 1, 1932, and assumed command of Submarine Force, United States Fleet and was responsible for administration of all submarines for two year, when he returned to the General Board of the Navy. After two-year tour in that capacity, Greenslade assumed command of Battleship Division 2, Battle Force in January 1937. He was promoted to the temporary rank of vice admiral on January 29, 1938, and assumed command of Battleships, Battle Force, United States Fleet.

== World War II ==
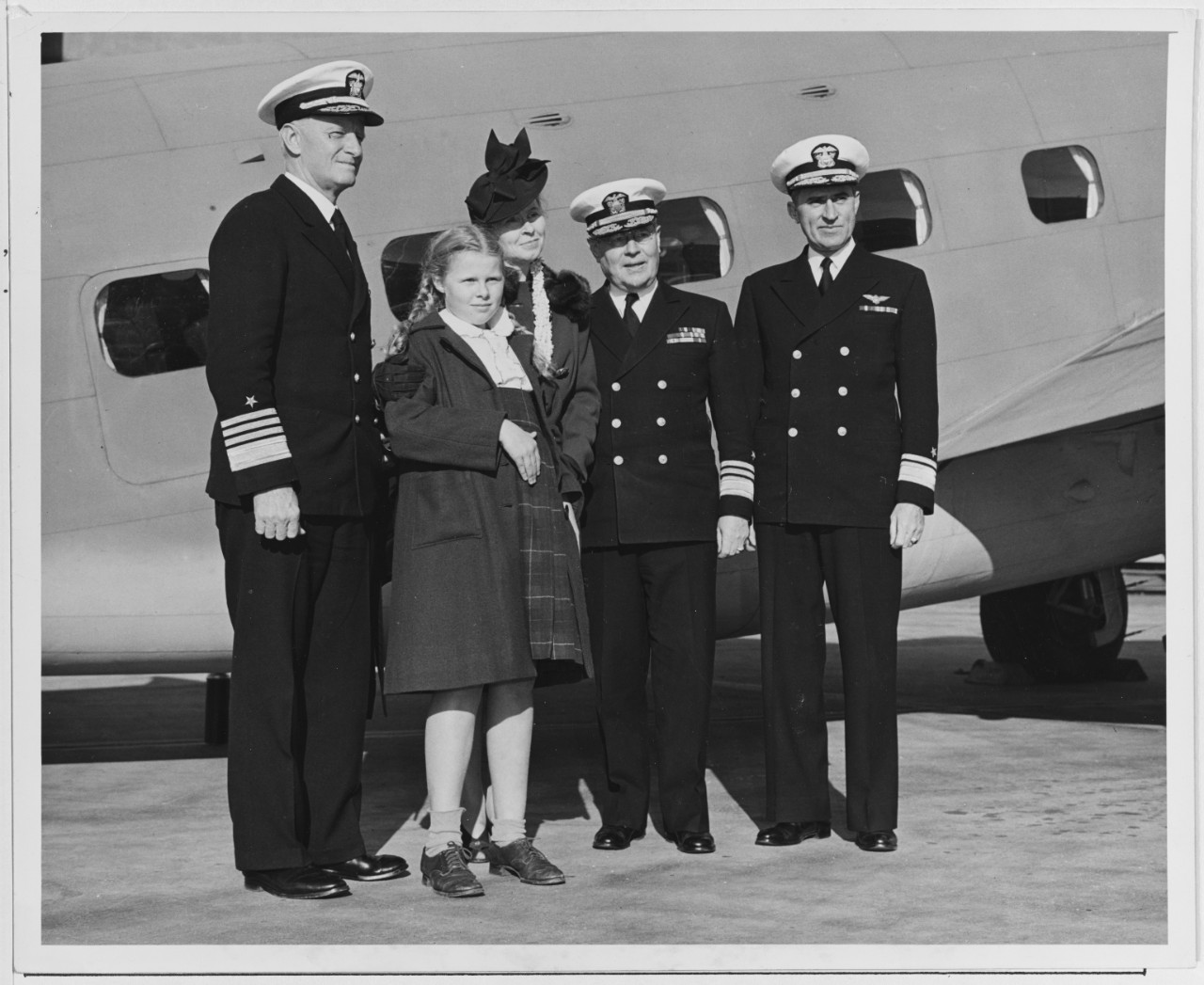
Greenslade (second from right) with Fleet admiral Chester Nimitz (left) and his family at Naval Air Station Alameda, California, in December 1942. Station commander, Rear admiral William K. Harrill on the right.

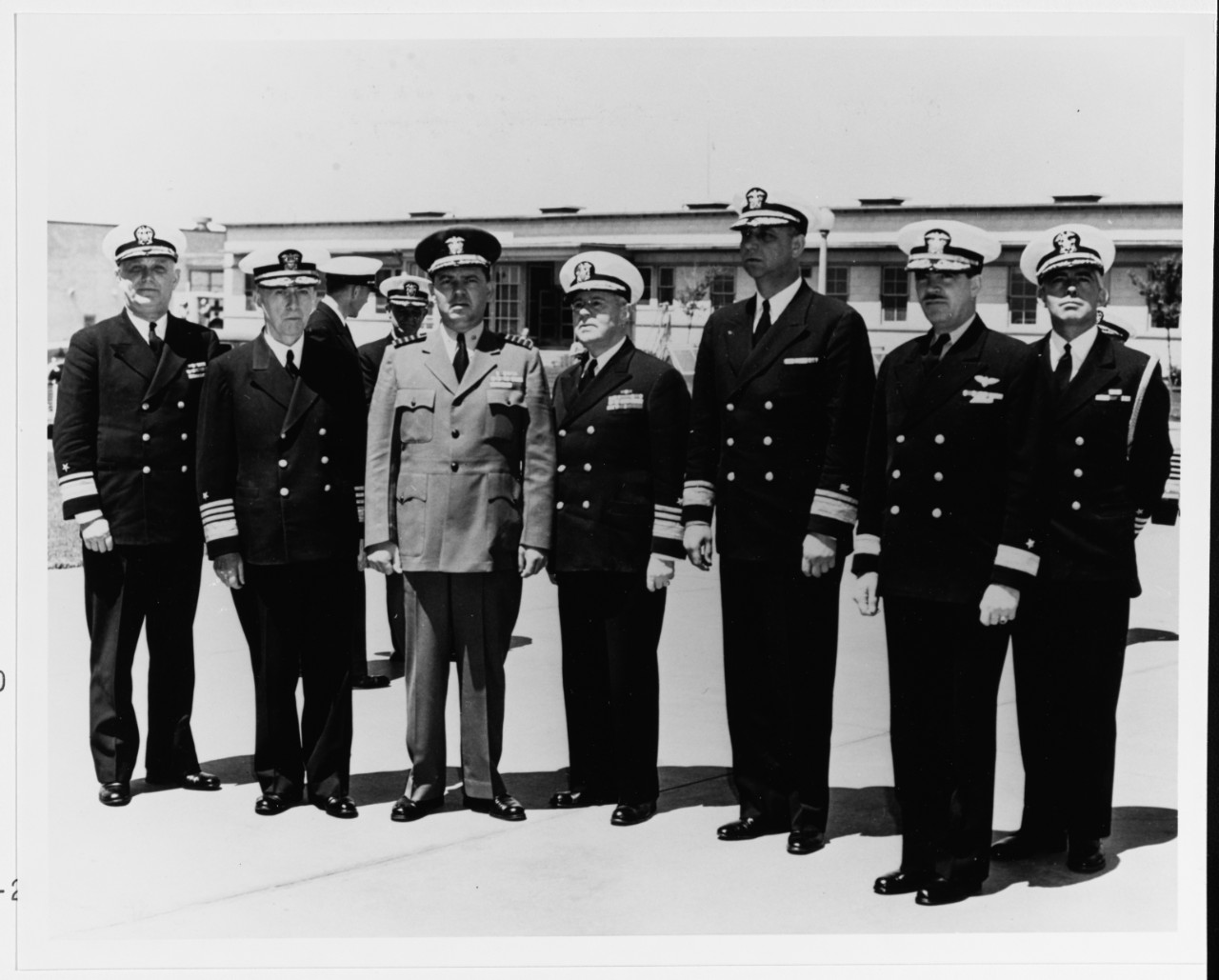
Greenslade (center) during the inspection at Naval Supply Depot, Clearfield, Utah in June 1945. He is accompanied by Admiral Royal E. Ingersoll, Commander, Western Sea Frontier (second from left) and his chief of staff, Rear admiral Glenn B. Davis (extreme left).

Greenslade completed his tour in June 1939 and reverted to his permanent rank of rear admiral. He was subsequently attached back to the General Board of the Navy and President Franklin D. Roosevelt personally selected him for the special board for selection of sites for new naval bases in British possessions in exchange for fifty U.S. destroyers in a lend-lease program.

In April 1941, Greenslade was ordered to Mare Island Navy Yard, California, where he assumed duty as commandant of the Twelfth Naval district. While in this capacity, his area of responsibility consisted of the following geographic areas Colorado; Utah; Nevada except Clark County; the northern part of California, including counties of San Luis Obispo, Kings, Tulare, Inyo, and all counties north thereof. Greenslade stirred up controversy, during his service at Mare Island Naval Shipyard, when urged that American-born and alien Japanese be excluded from areas of strategic importance. On April 17, 1942, the Navy seized Treasure Island, San Francisco, California, from the City of San Francisco under the direction of Greenslade, and paid no compensation for the confiscated island. Admiral Greenslade claimed Treasure Island was required for "national security" and appropriated the island for the Navy. On the other hand, Greenslade was very instrumental to the development and wartime growth of Naval Station Treasure Island.

Following the United States entry into World War II, Greenslade assumed additional duty as commander, Western Sea Frontier and was promoted again to the temporary rank of vice admiral on May 1, 1942. His new duty consisted of the sea defense of the Pacific coast of the United States and Mexico and the Eleventh, Twelfth, and Thirteenth Naval Districts were subordinated to his command. Greenslade served at Mare Island until February 1944, when he was succeeded by Vice Admiral David W. Bagley and retired from active duty.

Greenslade was decorated with his second Navy Distinguished Service Medal for displaying the highest qualities of leadership, judgment and planning in creating an organization to administer the routing and dispatching of convoys and independent sailings from the Western Sea Frontier, and in the initiation and administration of the necessary wartime procedures to most effectively employ available facilities in order to provide services to the Fleet in furthering their efforts against the enemy in the Pacific.

He remained on active service and assumed duty as Resources Coordinator on the staff of Commander Western Sea Frontier and established the Pacific Coast Joint Committees for Shipbuilding and Ship Repair and for Ship Operations. In this capacities, Greenslade a system for moving for keeping the supplies moving for the War against Japan. Greenslade served in this capacity until December, 1945, when he retired for second time, completing 46 years of active service.

Greenslade was decorated with Legion of Merit for his service as Resources Coordinator and also received Order of the British Empire from the Government of United Kingdom; Order of Vasco Núñez de Balboa from Panama; Order of the Aztec Eagle and Medal of Naval Merit, 1st Class from Mexico and Order of Merit from Chile.

== Retirement and death ==
Following his retirement from the Navy, Greenslade settled in his native Bellevue, Ohio, where he was active in Kiwanis and Rotary Clubs and also was honorary member of the Pacific-Union and Bohemian Clubs of San Francisco; and Army and Navy Club. He was also avid golf player and enjoyed sailing.

Vice admiral John W. Greenslade died on January 6, 1950, in his hometown, aged 69 and was buried with full military honors at United States Naval Academy Cemetery.

Greenslade was married three times: his first wife Marie Melanie died in 1936 and he had two sons from their marriage, John Francis (who also served in the Navy and retired as rear admiral) and Robert Wills. His second wife Marry Lee died in 1943 and his third wife Alma Rudd survived him and died in 1975.

== Decorations ==
Here is the ribbon bar of Vice admiral John W. Greenslade:

1st Row	Navy Distinguished Service Medal with one 5/16" Gold Star	Legion of Merit	Spanish Campaign Medal
2nd Row	Philippine Campaign Medal	Cuban Pacification Medal	Mexican Service Medal
3rd Row	World War I Victory Medal with Minelayer Clasp	American Defense Service Medal	American Campaign Medal
4th Row	World War II Victory Medal	Honorary Commander, Order of the British Empire	Commander of the Order of Vasco Núñez de Balboa (Panama)
5th Row	Commander of the Order of the Aztec Eagle (Mexico)	Medal of Naval Merit, 1st Class (Mexico)	Commander of the Order of Merit (Chile)

== See also ==
- USS Bronx (APA-236)
- USS Housatonic (SP-1697)

Military offices
Preceded by Position established	Commander, Western Sea Frontier; February 6, 1942 - February 1, 1944	Succeeded by David W. Bagley
Preceded by Arthur J. Hepburn	Commandant, Twelfth Naval district April 1941 - February 1, 1944	Succeeded by Carleton H. Wright
