= Admiral Clinton =

Admiral Clinton may refer to:

- Edward Clinton, 1st Earl of Lincoln (1512–1584–85), British Royal Navy admiral
- George Clinton (Royal Navy officer) (c. 1686–1761), British Royal Navy admiral

== See also ==
- Lewis Clinton-Baker (1866–1939), British Royal Navy admiral
