= USS Housatonic (SP-1697) =

Southern Pacific freighter

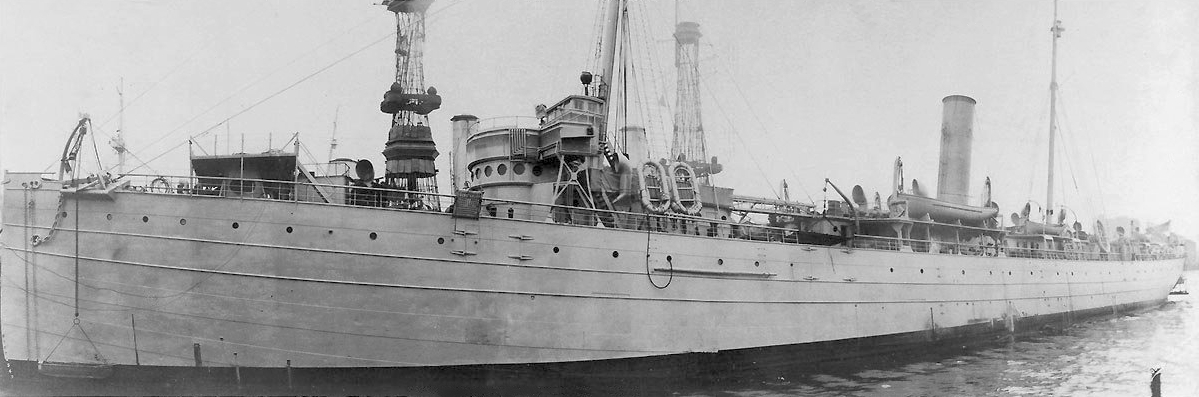
- The USS Housatonic (SP-1697)

History
- Name: El Rio (1899—1918); Housatonic (1918—1919); El Rio (1919—1925); Brazos (1925—1945))
- Namesake: (Navy) Housatonic River
- Owner: Morgan Steamship Co./Southern Pacific Co. (1899-1917); U.S. Navy (1917—1919); Morgan Steamship Co./Southern Pacific Co. (1919-1925); Clyde-Mallory Line (1925-1935); Atlantic, Gulf & West Indies Lines (Agwilines) (1935-1942)
- Builder: Newport News Shipbuilding, Norfolk, Virginia.
- Yard number: 24
- Launched: 24 June 1899
- Completed: 19 October 1899
- Commissioned: (Navy) 25 January 1918
- Decommissioned: (Navy) 5 August 1919
- In service: 1899
- Out of service: 1942
- Home port: New York, New York
- Identification: U.S. Official Number: 136761; Signal: KPJW; Signal: WHCB (1935—1942)
- Fate: Lost as Brazos in collision 1942.

General characteristics
- Type: Freighter (1899-1942); (Navy) Minelayer (1918—1919)
- Tonnage: 4,604 GRT, 2,918 NRT; 4,497 GRT, 2,703 NRT as Brazos 1927—1942
- Displacement: 7,620 tons
- Length: 405 ft 1 in (123.5 m) overall; 379 ft 9 in (115.7 m) on water line; 391.9 ft (119.5 m) registry
- Beam: 48.3 ft (14.7 m)
- Draft: 22 ft 6 in (6.9 m)
- Depth: 15.8 ft (4.8 m)
- Depth of hold: 26 ft (7.9 m)
- Propulsion: Vertical, triple expansion steam
- Speed: 15 kn (17 mph; 28 km/h)
- Capacity: (Navy) 830 mines (900 max)
- Complement: (Navy) 18 officers, 20 chief petty officers, 400 men
- Crew: 49
- Armament: (Navy); 1 × 5"/51 caliber gun; 2 × 3"/50 caliber guns; 2 machine guns

The second USS Housatonic was the Southern Pacific Steamship Company freighter El Rio. The ship was one of four company ships temporarily converted for planting the World War I North Sea Mine Barrage.

El Rio was built for the Morgan Line in 1899 and served as a freighter until the United States Shipping Board took control of the vessel in 1917 for conversion to wartime naval use. After return to commercial service the ship resumed normal freight operations. In 1925 the ship was sold to the Clyde-Mallory Lines and renamed Brazos. In 1935 the vessel was sold to Atlantic, Gulf & West Indies Lines (Agwilines) continuing freight service until sunk in a collision in 1942.

== El Rio ==
El Rio was launched as hull number 24 by Newport News Shipbuilding and Dry Dock Company at Newport News, Virginia on 24 June 1899 and completed 19 October 1899 for the Morgan Line. (Note: Five ships for the Morgan Line had been built as hulls 2 through 6 between 1891 and 1893 with hull number 5 being an earlier El Rio. That ship was one of the three converted to become an auxiliary cruiser, USS Dixie (1893).) The 4,604 GRT ship was assigned U.S. Official Number 136761, signal KPJW with home port of New York, New York. El Rio was intended for service between New York City and Gulf of Mexico seaports of New Orleans and Galveston, Texas. The Morgan Line was incorporated into the Southern Pacific system.

== Big Four minelayers ==
The United States converted eight civilian steamships as minelayers for the 100,000 mines manufactured for the barrage. British Rear Admiral Lewis Clinton-Baker described the North Sea mine barrage as the "biggest mine planting stunt in the world's history."

The largest of the converted minelayers were four freighters owned by Southern Pacific Steamship Company. Southern Pacific Transportation Company had evolved from the First transcontinental railroad to become the dominant transportation provider in California. Owners of the original Central Pacific Railroad were known as the Big Four. Sailors similarly referred to these former Southern Pacific ships as the Big Four.

- El Siglo became No. 1694 USS Canandaigua
- El Dia became No. 1695 USS Roanoke
- El Cid became No. 1696 USS Canonicus
- El Rio became No. 1697 USS Housatonic

== Conversion ==
The United States Shipping Board took control of the ship from Southern Pacific Steamship Company in 1917. Housatonic was fitted out for United States Navy service at Tietjen & Lang's shipyard at Hoboken, New Jersey. Work began on 25 November 1917. Gun platforms were added for two anti-aircraft guns forward and a 5"/51 caliber gun aft. The minelaying conversion enabled her to carry mines on three decks, and included six Otis elevators individually capable of transferring two mines every 20 seconds from the storage decks to the launching deck. Stern ports were cut for launching the mines and the rudder quadrant was raised to give adequate clearance. Watertight subdivision was improved by strengthening existing bulkheads and building two new bulkheads to divide the largest compartments so the ship might stay afloat if only one compartment were flooded. Quarters were enlarged to accommodate messing and berthing arrangements for a crew of about 400. The main machinery was overhauled and auxiliary machinery was added for the elevators, for heating the berthing spaces, for refrigerated food storage, for additional fresh water distilling capacity, for magazine sprinklers and galley and washroom plumbing, and enlarged electric generators for lighting and radio communications. Existing coal bunkers on the third deck were replaced with a bunker in the hold forward of the boiler room with chutes to load coal over the mines. Larger boats and heavier anchors required larger davits and anchor windlass, and the mines required specialized handling machinery.

1918 Navy data after conversion show the ship as being 405 ft 1 in (123.5 m) length overall, 379 ft 9 in (115.7 m) length on water line, beam of 48 ft 3 in (14.7 m), depth of hold 26 ft (7.9 m), mean draft of 22 ft 6 in (6.9 m) and displacement of 7,620 tons. Gross and net tonnage are identical to the merchant vessel registry with 4,604 GRT and 2,918 NRT. Propulsion was by a vertical, triple expansion steam engine with three double ended boilers providing steam with 4,000 ihp giving a speed of 15 kn (17 mph; 28 km/h). Bunker capacity was 943 tons. Electric power was by four 15 kW 110 V direct current General Electric generating sets. Crew is shown as 18 officers, 20 chief petty officers and 400 men.

== Wartime service ==
USS Housatonic was commissioned on 25 January 1918 with Captain John Greenslade, USN, in command . While operating as part of Mine Squadron 1 out of Inverness, Scotland, from 7 June until the close of the war on 11 November 1918, Housatonic laid a total of 9,339 mines:

- planted 769 mines during the 1st minelaying excursion on 7 June,
- planted 800 mines during the 2nd minelaying excursion on 30 June,
- planted 840 mines during the 3rd minelaying excursion on 14 July,
- planted 830 mines during the 4th minelaying excursion on 29 July,
- planted 320 mines during the 5th minelaying excursion on 8 August,
- planted 810 mines during the 7th minelaying excursion on 26 August,
- planted 820 mines during the 8th minelaying excursion on 7 September,
- planted 830 mines during the 9th minelaying excursion on 20 September,
- planted 860 mines during the 10th minelaying excursion on 27 September,
- planted 840 mines during the 11th minelaying excursion on 4 October,
- planted 820 mines during the 12th minelaying excursion on 13 October, and
- planted 800 mines during the final 13th minelaying excursion on 24 October.

Housatonic then made three trips returning soldiers of the American Expeditionary Forces to the United States.

John Greenslade was awarded the Navy Distinguished Service Medal while aboard Housatonic.

== Return to Southern Pacific ==
Housatonic decommissioned 5 August 1919 and was returned to the Southern Pacific Steamship Company. El Rio was renamed Brazos in 1925 for operation with Clyde-Mallory Lines. Brazos on 21 December 1932 had been involved in a collision determined to have been caused by mutual fault in fog off Galveston with Eglantine, a vessel owned by the United States, resulting in a lawsuit by Clyde-Mallory Lines regarding a two-year limitation period for such suits resulting in an appellate court ruling that the two year limitation should have applied. The U.S. Supreme Court affirmed that decision.

In 1935 the ship began operations with Atlantic, Gulf & West Indies Lines (Agwilines) with a signal letter change to WHCB. Brazos continued operating until lost in a collision 13 January 1942. The collision with HMS Archer, an escort carrier transporting aircraft from Norfolk, Virginia to Kingston, Jamaica and suffering from steering and gyrocompass failures, occurred about two and a half hours before midnight. Archer spotted the freighter and put engines in reverse but too late to avoid a collision. Both ships suffered damage with Brazos sinking and Archer eventually requiring tow and repairs in Charleston. All the freighter's crew was taken aboard Archer, two having suffered injury. (Note: The reference, "A history of HMS Archer" incorrectly states that Brazos was a "Peruvian merchantman.")

== See also ==
History of the Southern Pacific
