= North Sea Mine Barrage =

Large minefield laid by the United States in World War I

- Part of the First World War
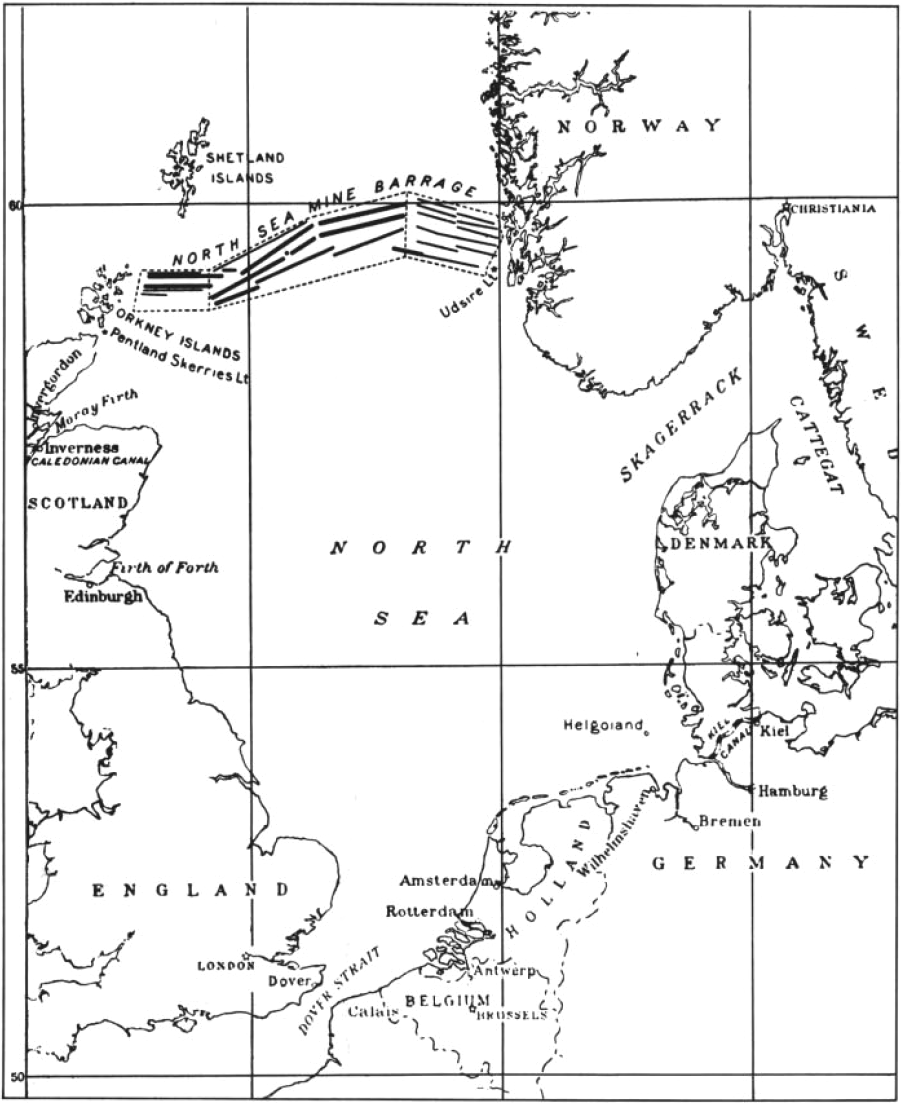
- Map of the North Sea mine barrage
Date	June – 26 October 1918
Location	North Sea

Belligerents
United States; United Kingdom	Germany

The North Sea Mine Barrage, also known as the Northern Barrage, was a large minefield laid easterly from the Orkney Islands to Norway by the United States Navy (assisted by the Royal Navy) during the First World War. The objective was to inhibit the movement of U-boats from bases in Germany to the Atlantic shipping lanes bringing supplies to the British Isles. Rear Admiral Lewis Clinton-Baker, commanding the Royal Navy minelaying force, described the barrage as the "biggest mine planting stunt in the world's history".

== Concept ==
The idea of a mine barrage across the North Sea was first proposed in the summer of 1916 by Admiral Reginald Bacon and was agreed at the Allied Naval Conference on 5 September 1917. The Royal Navy—and in particular Admiral Beatty as Commander in Chief of the Grand Fleet—was skeptical about the value of the operation and did not feel it justified the large logistical and manufacturing commitment required. A minefield across the North Sea would require mining water 900 feet (270 m) deep, when no minefield had been established in waters more than 300 ft (91 m) deep. A minefield across the North Sea had been estimated to require 400,000 conventional anchored mines. An "antenna" mine developed in July 1917 was effective at the assumed maximum submarine depth of 200 ft (61 m) and 100,000 of these new Mk 6 mines would be adequate to form the North Sea mine barrage.

The United States was altogether more enthusiastic about the operation, as the loss of trans-Atlantic shipping was a major domestic concern and this plan allowed the United States to play an active part in tackling this, while playing to their industrial strength and with minimal risk of American casualties. Franklin D. Roosevelt, the Assistant Secretary of the Navy, appealed directly to President Woodrow Wilson to overcome opposition to the project from Vice Admiral William Sims, who commanded all United States naval forces in Europe. The U.S. Navy tendered an order for the Mk 6 mines in October 1917 with 80,000,000 ft (15,000 mi; 24,000 km) of steel wire rope required to moor the mines to the seabed. Project spending of $40 million was shared among 140 manufacturing contractors and over 400 sub-contractors. All mine components other than wire rope, explosives and detonating circuitry were manufactured by Detroit automobile firms. Eight civilian steamships were converted to minelayers and another 24 mine-carrying freighters, sailing at a rate of two or three per week, were required to transport manufactured mine components to assembly depots in Scotland.

== Objectives ==
The objective was to prevent U-boats from operating in the North Atlantic and preying on trans-Atlantic shipping. A similar barrage had already been placed across the English Channel, which had resulted in U-boats diverting north around Scotland. The North Sea Mine Barrage was intended to close this alternative route, and it also made it hard for the U-boats to get supplies.

== Mark 6 Mines ==
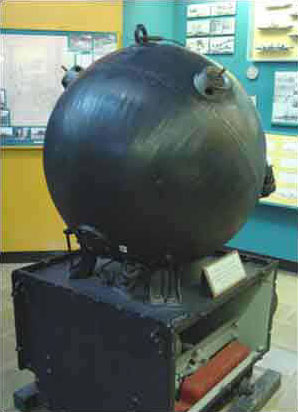
A Mk 6 mine atop its anchor. Two horn fuzes are visible, but the antenna fuze cannot be seen in this image.

The Mk 6 mine was a 34-inch-diameter (86 cm) steel sphere containing a buoyancy chamber and 300 lb (140 kg) of TNT. Each mine was constructed of two steel hemispheres welded together. A Toxyl bursting charge was cast into the lower hemisphere. Toxyl was a mixture of 60% trinitroxylene (TNX) with 40% TNT used because the United States Army controlled United States TNT production and would not release sufficient quantities for the naval mine barrage. For transport, the mine rested atop a box-shaped steel anchor approximately 30 in (760 mm) square.

The anchor box had wheels allowing the mine assembly to be moved along a system of rails aboard the minelayer. The mine was connected to its 800 lb (360 kg) anchor box by a wire rope mooring cable stored on a reel. The depth of the mine below the water surface was controlled by allowing the steel mooring cable to unwind from its reel as the mine was dropped from the minelayer until a sensor suspended beneath the anchor reached the bottom. The sensor locked the cable reel so the falling anchor would pull the buoyant mine below the surface; and the float extended the antenna above the mine.

Each mine had two hydrostatic safety features intended to render the mine safe if it detached from its mooring cable and floated to the surface. The first was an open switch in the detonation circuit closed by hydrostatic pressure. The second was a spring pushing the detonator away from the explosive charge into the buoyancy chamber unless compressed by hydrostatic pressure. The mines were intended to be safe at depths less than 25 ft (7.6 m). The mines contained a dry cell battery each with an electrical detonating circuit which could be initiated by any one of five parallel fuzes. Four of the fuzes were conventional horns in the buoyant upper hemisphere of the mine. Each horn contained a glass ampoule of electrolyte which would connect an open circuit if an ampoule was broken by bending the soft metal horn.

The novel fifth fuze was a copper wire antenna with a float to extend it above the mine. A ship's steel hull touching the copper antenna would form a battery, and seawater acted as an electrolyte completing a circuit with an insulated copper plate on the mine surface to actuate a detonating relay within the mine. The relay armature was initially set to complete the detonating circuit at 25 to 40 millivolts. The Bureau of Ordnance subsequently increased sensitivity to 10 to 25 millivolts, but this was later readjusted on the basis of field experience. Each mine had five spring-loaded safety switches in the detonating circuit held open by salt pellets which took about 20 minutes to dissolve in sea water after the mine was dropped overboard from the minelayer. Battery life for the detonating circuit was estimated at greater than two years.

== Laying the minefield ==
The mine barrage was within a belt 230 mi (200 nmi; 370 km) long and 15 mi (13 nmi; 24 km) to 35 mi (30 nmi; 56 km) wide divided into area B off the east coast of Orkney, area C near the Norwegian coast between Utsira and Bergen, and the longest central area A connecting the two coastal areas between 0° 50′ West and 3° 10′ East. The Royal Navy laid mines in areas B and C while the United States Navy mined area A. The Royal Navy left a 10 mi (8.7 nmi; 16 km) channel open for navigation adjacent to Orkney. Because of neutrality regulations no mines were laid within Norwegian territorial waters. The United States North Sea Mine Force was commanded by Rear Admiral Joseph Strauss aboard the Atlantic Fleet Mine Force flagship USS Black Hawk. Strauss was an ordnance specialist and had been chief of the Bureau of Ordnance from 1913 to 1916. Mine Squadron One, under the command of Captain Reginald R. Belknap, assembled at Inverness, Scotland in June 1918. Over the following five months, these ships planted 56,571 of the 70,177 mines laid to form the North Sea mine barrage.

The WWI Mine Memorial on Boston Common, Massachusetts, United States

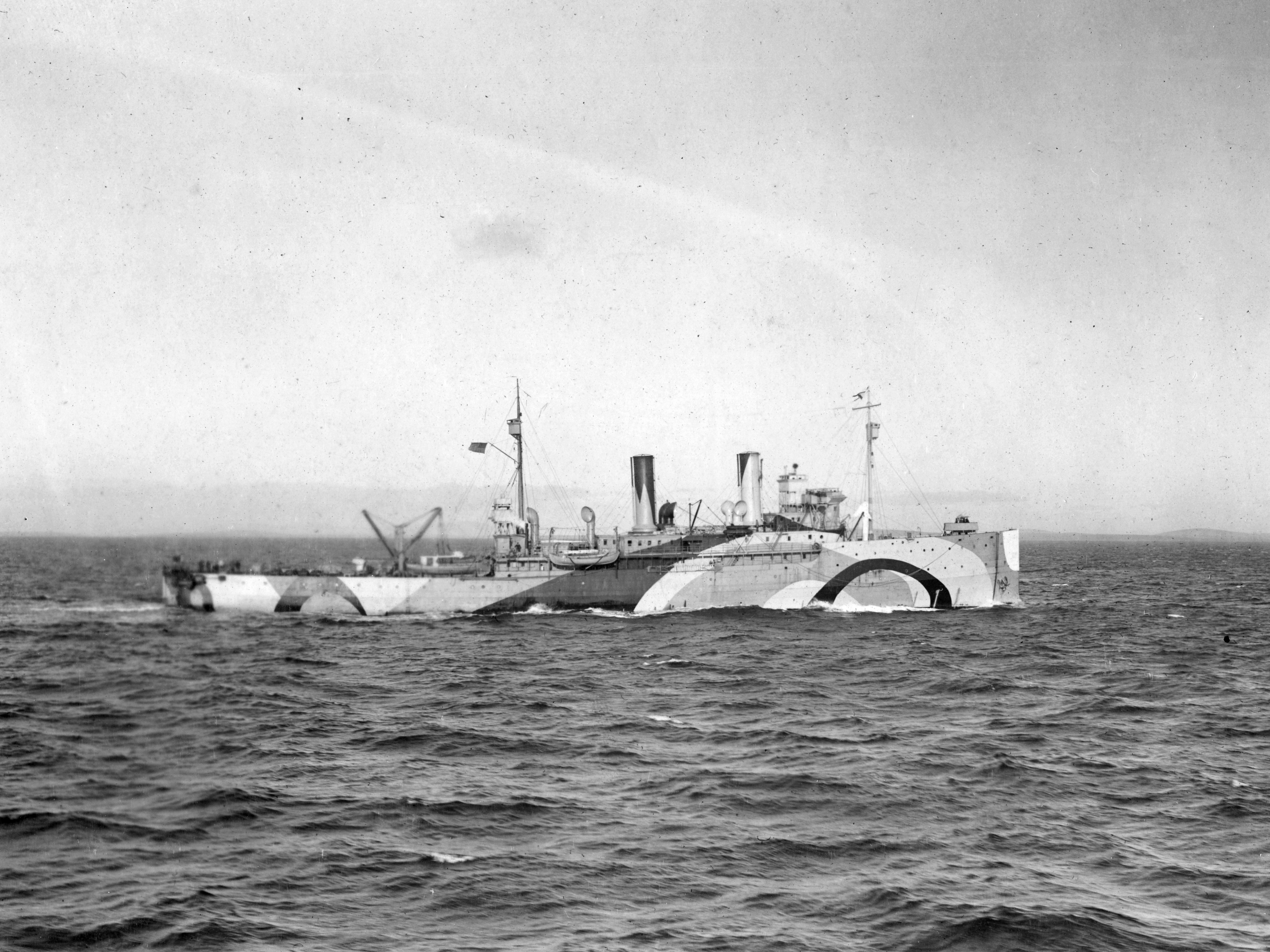
Only the two smallest of the eight steamships converted to lay the barrage remained in commission for conventional minelaying operations. USS Shawmut, shown laying the North Sea mine barrage, sank 23 years later during the attack on Pearl Harbor after being renamed Oglala.

- USS San Francisco (old protected cruiser converted in 1911 to carry 170 mines) (flagship)
- USS Baltimore (old protected cruiser converted in 1915 carry 180 mines)
- USS Aroostook (former Eastern steamship Bunker Hill carried 320 mines on one deck)
- USS Shawmut (former Eastern steamship Massachusetts carried 320 mines on one deck)
- USS Canandaigua (former Southern Pacific freighter El Siglo carried 830 mines on 3 decks)
- USS Roanoke (former Southern Pacific freighter El Dia carried 830 mines on 3 decks)
- USS Canonicus (former Southern Pacific freighter El Cid carried 830 mines on 3 decks)
- USS Housatonic (former Southern Pacific freighter El Rio carried 830 mines on 3 decks)
- USS Saranac (former Old Dominion steamship Hamilton carried 612 mines on 2 decks)
- USS Quinnebaug (former Old Dominion steamship Jefferson carried 612 mines on 2 decks)

The mine barrage consisted of 18 rows of mines laid in an east–west direction. Ten rows of mines were laid at a depth of 80 ft (24 m) to be detonated by ships traveling on the surface. Submerged submarines were targeted by four rows of mines at 160 ft (49 m), and another four rows at 240 ft (73 m). Since Utsira is slightly north of Orkney, alignment of minefields within the central area A was skewed east-north-easterly from Orkney. Where possible, longitude was determined from a calibrated taut-wire anchored near a landmark and unreeled from a 140 mi (230 km) spool of piano wire aboard one of the cruisers acting as the minelaying formation guide. Latitude was checked from the elevation of the sun when atmospheric conditions permitted.

The mine barrage required many missions, called "excursions", laying parallel rows of mines part way across the North Sea between Norway and Orkney. Mine Squadron One made thirteen two-day minelaying excursions laying parallel rows of mines while steaming in columns 500 yards (460 m) apart, with the last ship in each column dropping mines at 100 yd (91 m) intervals. As a minelayer exhausted its supply of mines, another minelayer in that column would drop back to the last position to continue the minelaying sequence. The minelayers were preceded by Royal Navy destroyers sweeping for enemy mines and submarines. A covering force of battleships with Royal Navy cruiser squadrons maneuvered nearby to defend the minelaying formation, but no German surface warships attempted engagement. Buoys were dropped temporarily marking the end point of a mining excursion to avoid leaving an un-mined gap when the next excursion started. These buoys were subject to potential movement by storms or enemy action.

Three to five percent of the new mines dropped into the North Sea detonated as soon as the salt pellets dissolved; and hydrophones detected premature detonations continuing for a week after minelaying. These premature detonations were initially attributed to activation of the horn fuze detonation circuits by seawater leaking into the mines; and mine spacing was increased from 250 ft (76 m) on the first minelaying excursion to 300 ft (91 m) on subsequent excursions to minimize leakage caused by detonation of nearby mines. About one percent of the mines deployed during the first excursion broke free of their mooring cables and washed ashore in Norway within a month. Mines used for the last eleven excursions had springs installed at the mine mooring cable attachment points to buffer wave loading during storms. Premature detonations increased to 14 percent for the fourth minelaying excursion because some mines had been assembled with the more sensitive antenna fuze relay settings made by the Bureau of Ordnance. The fifth minelaying excursion was halted when 19 percent of the mines detonated prematurely. San Francisco identified relay armature sensitivity as a major cause of premature detonations during a comparative field test minelaying excursion on 12 August. Subsequent investigations revealed copper sulfate deposits caused by antenna corrosion created a weak battery, increasing the probability of relay activation by shock wave accelerations when nearby mines detonated. Premature detonations dropped to four to six percent when sensitivity was adjusted to 30 to 45 millivolts for mines deployed by the last five minelaying excursions.

== Results ==
Supply problems and technical difficulties caused some delays. More minelaying excursions to complete the barrage were cancelled when the approaching end of hostilities was recognized after the thirteenth minelaying excursion on 26 October 1918. The design of the minefield meant there was a theoretical 66 per cent chance of a surfaced U-boat triggering a mine and a 33 per cent chance for a submerged U-boat. On the basis of the number of effective mines observed while sweeping the barrage, the actual odds were assessed at being closer to 20 per cent for a surfaced U-boat and 10 per cent for a submerged one. As the final mines were laid only a matter of days before the end of the war, it is impossible to assess the success of the plan. Some contend the minefield was a major cause of the declining morale of the Imperial German Navy through the final months of the war, while others suggest Germany easily swept safe channels through the large, unguarded minefield.

The official statistics on lost German submarines compiled on 1 March 1919 credited the North Sea mine barrage with the certain destruction of four U-boats, presumed destruction of two more and possible destruction of another two.

- 19 August 1918 SM UB-12 unknown - possibly sunk by the North Sea mine barrage
- 9 September 1918 SM U-92 presumed sunk by the North Sea mine barrage area B (confirmed in 2007)
- 9 September 1918 SM UB-127 sunk by the North Sea mine barrage area B
- 25 September 1918 SM U-156 sunk by the North Sea mine barrage area A
- September 1918 SM U-102 presumed sunk by the North Sea mine barrage area B (confirmed in 2006)
- 19 September 1918 SM UB-104 sunk by the North Sea mine barrage area B
- September 1918 SM UB-113 unknown - possibly sunk by the North Sea mine barrage
- 18 October 1918 SM UB-123 sunk by the North Sea mine barrage area A

Eight more boats were known to have been damaged by the mines and some Admiralty personnel assumed the field might be responsible for five more U-boats which disappeared without explanation.

== Removal ==
United States participation in the minesweeping effort was overseen by Rear Admiral Strauss aboard the repair ship Black Hawk, from which he had commanded the minelaying operation. Tugs Patapsco and Patuxent towed Admiralty wooden sailing smacks Red Rose and Red Fern out to conduct the first trial sweep in December. Sweeping was accomplished by suspending a serrated wire between two ships on a parallel course. While held underwater by planing devices called "kites", the wire would foul the cables suspending the buoyant mines above their anchors. If the serrated wire parted the mine mooring cable, the mine would bob to the surface to be destroyed by gunfire. The smacks swept and destroyed six mines before winter weather halted further work at sea. The winter was spent testing an electrical protective device to reduce the risk of sweeping the antenna mines with steel-hulled ships. Patapsco and Patuxent tested the protective device by sweeping 39 mines in March. Royal Navy minesweeping efforts involved 421 vessels manned by 600 officers and 15,000 men from 1 April to 30 November 1919.

Twelve Lapwing class minesweepers and 18 submarine chasers were available for the first routine sweep of the United States minesweepers on 29 April 1919. After the first sweep took two days to clear 221 mines, Strauss requested more ships in the hope of clearing the mine barrage that summer. Twenty Admiralty trawlers with American crews, 16 more Lapwing class minesweepers, and another repair ship Panther were assigned to his command. Panther was given responsibility for tending trawlers William Ashton, Thomas Blackhorne, Thomas Buckley, Richard Bulkeley, George Burton, Pat Caharty, William Caldwell, George Clarke, John Clay, George Cochrane, John Collins, William Darnold, Sam Duffy, John Dunkin, John Fitzgerald, John Graham, Thomas Graham, Thomas Henrix, William Johnson, Thomas Laundry, and submarine chasers SC-37, 38, 40, 44, 45, 46, 47, 48, 95, 110, 164, 178, 181, 182, 206, 207, 208, 254, 256, 259, 272, 329, 354 and 356. Blackhawk provided tender services for the larger ships operating as six divisions.

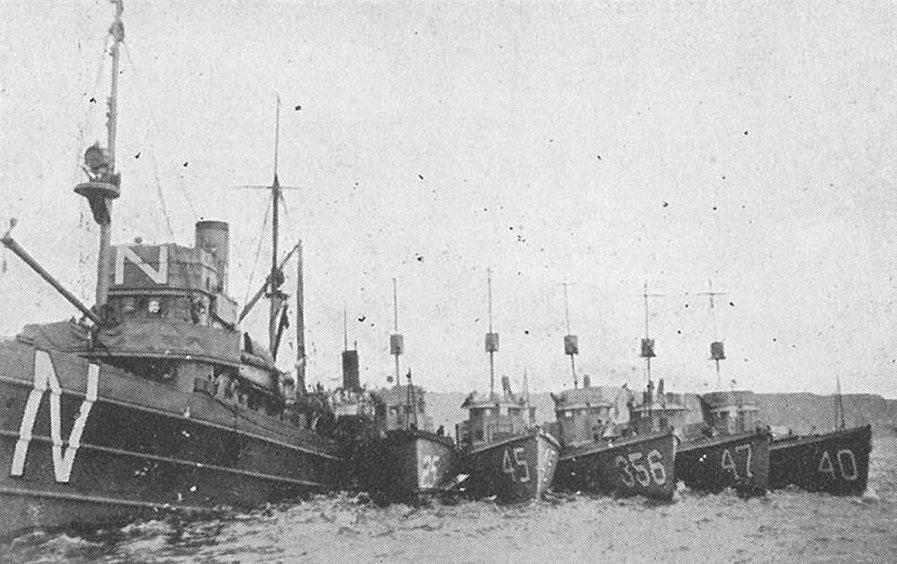
USS Eider (Minesweeper No. 17) (left) in port with submarine chasers alongside during the clearance of the North Sea Mine Barrage in 1919. The leftmost submarine chaser is either SC-254, SC-256 or SC-259 and the others are (left to right) SC-45, SC-356, SC-47, and SC-40.

- Mine Division 1: Turkey, Robin, Quail, Kingfisher, Finch, Falcon
- Mine Division 2: Eider, Pelican, Bobolink, Woodcock, Rail, Teal, Seagull, Swallow
- Mine Division 3: Oriole, Auk, Heron, Sanderling, Chewink, Tanager
- Mine Division 4: Thrush, Avocet, Grebe, Curlew, Cormorant, Mallard
- Mine Division 5: Lark, Swan, Widgeon, Whippoorwill, Flamingo
- Buoying Division: Osprey, Patapsco, Patuxent, Lapwing, Penguin

Common difficulties with the sweeping procedure involved mine cables becoming entangled in the kites attached to the sweeping wires. Sweeping gear was often lost if the mine detonated and cut the sweeping cables. Approximately one-third of the ships were damaged by exploding mines. Two men were killed in separate incidents while attempting to haul mines aboard to clear fouled sweeping kites. It had been assumed the Mk 6 mine hydrostatic safety devices would minimize the risks of this procedure, but sweeping gear losses increased after unreliability of these safety devices was recognized. Counter-mining sequences initiated by destruction of a swept mine causing detonation of an undetected mine closer to one of the minesweepers were another source of damage.

Some of this counter-mining was attributed to acceleration of the antenna fuze relay armature or seawater leaking into damaged mines rather than sympathetic detonation of explosives. The minesweepers were sometimes able to continue sweeping, but the trawlers were less durable. Seven men drowned when the Richard Bulkeley was sunk by a mine detonation on 12 July. Strauss discontinued use of the trawlers for minesweeping, but retained six for transporting replacement sweeping gear to minesweepers when wires were destroyed by exploding mines. The remaining 13 trawlers were returned to the Admiralty. Most damaged ships were repaired, but SC-38 was declared a total loss. Three more men of the minesweeping force were killed in individual accidents involving sweeping gear before Strauss declared the barrage cleared on 30 September 1919. The minesweepers found only about 25 to 30 percent of the mines laid a year earlier; but it was assumed the others had either broken free, sunk to the bottom or been destroyed by premature explosions. Strauss was recognized as a Knight Commander of St Michael and St George for his efforts.

== Post war ==
At the end of 1919, winter forced the suspension of sweeping for moored buoyant mines but the Royal Navy resumed minesweeping operations the following spring, continuing to clear sunken mines from fishing grounds and maintaining a destroyer patrol to track down mines that had broken free of their moorings and gone adrift. Losses of civilian ships to North Sea mines continued; the origin of the mine in these cases was often difficult to determine. In 1919, twenty crewmen drowned when the Swedish steamship Hollander sank, minutes after striking a mine in October; and the steamer Kerwood struck a mine and sank on 1 December.

== See also ==
- Otranto Barrage

== Bibliography ==
- Armstrong, Harry C. (1988). "The Removal of the North Sea Mine Barrage". Warship International. XXV (2): 134–169. ISSN 0043-0374.
