= USS Canandaigua (ID-1694) =

Southern Pacific freighter

History

United States
- Name: USS Canandaigua
- Builder: Newport News Shipbuilding and Dry Dock Company, Newport News, Virginia
- Launched: May 1901
- Commissioned: 2 March 1918
- Notes: Operated as commercial passenger-cargo ship El Siglo c. 1901-1917

General characteristics
- Type: Minelayer (in 1918)
- Displacement: 7,000 tons
- Length: 405 ft (123 m)
- Beam: 48 ft (15 m)
- Draft: 20 ft (6.1 m)
- Speed: 15 knots
- Capacity: 830 mines (900 max)
- Crew: 21 officers and 400 men
- Armament: 1 × 5"/51 caliber gun; 2 × 3"/23 caliber guns

The second USS Canandaigua was the Southern Pacific freighter El Siglo temporarily converted for planting the World War I North Sea Mine Barrage. Newport News Shipbuilding and Dry Dock Company launched El Siglo at Newport News, Virginia in May 1901 for service between New York City and Gulf of Mexico seaports of New Orleans and Galveston, Texas. The United States Shipping Board took control of the ship from Southern Pacific Steamship Company in 1917.

== Conversion ==
She was fitted out for United States Navy service by Morse Dry Dock and Repair Company at Brooklyn, New York. Work began on 20 November 1917. Gun platforms were added for two anti-aircraft guns forward and a 5"/51 caliber gun aft. The minelaying conversion enabled her to carry mines on three decks, and included six Otis elevators individually capable of transferring two mines every 20 seconds from the storage decks to the launching deck. Stern ports were cut for launching the mines and the rudder quadrant was raised to give adequate clearance. Watertight subdivision was improved by strengthening existing bulkheads and building two new bulkheads to divide the largest compartments so the ship might stay afloat if only one compartment were flooded. Quarters were enlarged to accommodate messing and berthing arrangements for a crew of about 400. The main machinery was overhauled and auxiliary machinery was added for the elevators, for heating the berthing spaces, for refrigerated food storage, for additional fresh water distilling capacity, for magazine sprinklers and galley and washroom plumbing, and enlarged electric generators for lighting and radio communications. Existing coal bunkers on the third deck were replaced with a bunker in the hold forward of the boiler room with chutes to load coal over the mines. Larger boats and heavier anchors required larger davits and anchor windlass, and the mines required specialized handling machinery.

== Wartime service ==
USS Canandaigua was commissioned on 2 March 1918. While operating as part of Mine Squadron 1 out of Inverness, Scotland, from 7 June until the close of the war on 11 November 1918, Canandaigua a total of 8,829 mines:

- planted 775 mines during the 1st minelaying excursion on 7 June,
- planted 710 mines during the 2nd minelaying excursion on 30 June,
- planted 760 mines during the 3rd minelaying excursion on 14 July,
- planted 779 mines during the 4th minelaying excursion on 29 July,
- planted 170 mines during the 5th minelaying excursion on 8 August,
- planted 640 mines during the 6th minelaying excursion on 18 August,
- planted 810 mines during the 7th minelaying excursion on 26 August,
- planted 820 mines during the 8th minelaying excursion on 7 September,
- planted 830 mines during the 9th minelaying excursion on 20 September,
- planted 840 mines during the 10th minelaying excursion on 27 September,
- planted 840 mines during the 11th minelaying excursion on 4 October, and
- planted 855 mines during the 12th minelaying excursion on 13 October.

Canandaigua then made three trips returning soldiers of the American Expeditionary Forces to the United States before decommissioning and return to Southern Pacific Steamship Company in 1919.

== Big Four ==
In the words of British Rear Admiral Lewis Clinton-Baker, the North Sea mine barrage was the "biggest mine planting stunt in the world's history." The United States converted eight civilian steamships as minelayers for the 100,000 mines manufactured for the barrage. The largest of these were four freighters owned by Southern Pacific Steamship Company. Southern Pacific Transportation Company had evolved from the First transcontinental railroad to become the dominant transportation provider in California. Owners of the original Central Pacific Railroad were known as the Big Four. Sailors similarly referred to these former Southern Pacific ships as the Big Four.

- El Siglo became No. 1694 USS Canandaigua
- El Dia became No. 1695 USS Roanoke
- El Cid became No. 1696 USS Canonicus
- El Rio became No. 1697 USS Housatonic
