= Lewis Clinton-Baker =

Royal Navy Admiral; Commander-in-Chief, East Indies Station (1866–1939)

Admiral Sir Lewis Clinton-Baker KCB KCVO CBE
- Born: 16 March 1866
- Died: 12 December 1939 (aged 73)
- Military career
- Allegiance: United Kingdom
- Branch: Royal Navy
- Service years: 1879–1927
- Rank: Admiral
- Commands: HMS Gibraltar; HMS Berwick; HMS Hercules; HMS Benbow; East Indies Station
- Conflicts: Mahdist War; Second Boer War; World War I
- Awards: Knight Commander of the Order of the Bath; Knight Commander of the Royal Victorian Order; Commander of the Order of the British Empire

Admiral Sir Lewis Clinton-Baker KCB KCVO CBE (16 March 1866 – 12 December 1939) was a Royal Navy officer who served as Commander-in-Chief, East Indies Station.

== Life ==
He was born at Bayfordbury, Hertfordshire, the second son of William Clinton Baker J.P. (1839–1903) and his wife Edith Mildmay Ashhurst Majendie, eldest daughter of the Rev. Henry Lewis Majendie.

Clinton-Baker joined the Royal Navy in 1879. He took part in the bombardment of Alexandria in 1882 and went to command HMS Gibraltar during the Second Boer War. He was promoted to Commander on 1 January 1901 and commanded HMS Berwick from 1908.

He served in World War I as Captain of HMS Hercules, which he commanded at the Battle of Jutland in 1916. With him there on the Hercules was Gustav von Schoultz, the Finnish naval attaché from the Russian Empire, who wrote in his memoirs of waiting on the bridge with Clinton-Baker, waiting for the signal to deploy. He was Captain of HMS Benbow from later that year; he then took responsibility for laying a mine barrage across the North Sea from a base at Grangemouth.

He became Second-in-Command of the Second Battle Squadron in 1919, Admiral Superintendent of Chatham Dockyard in 1920 and Commander-in-Chief, East Indies Station in 1921. In 1925 he was made Admiral commanding the Reserves and in 1927 he retired.

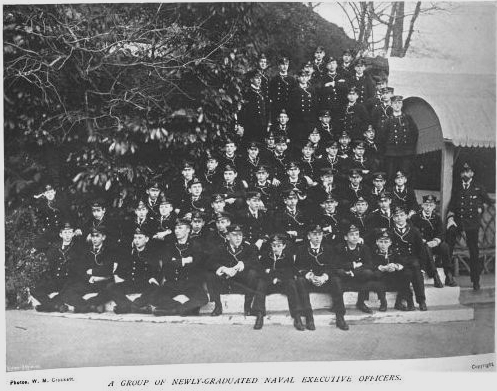
Graduates of Britannia Royal Naval College, 1899 photograph with Lieut. Clinton-Baker on the right, 1899 photograph

== Pinetum ==
Clinton-Baker's residence in later life was at Bayfordbury. His grandfather William Robert Baker (1810–1897) had founded a pinetum there, in 1837, based on existing fir trees, working with John Claudius Loudon and applying taxonomy from the de Jussieu system. His elder brother Henry William Clinton Baker developed it further, from 1903. Clinton-Baker introduced the cypress Chamaecyparis formosensis, collected on Formosa in 1910.

In 1945, after Clinton-Baker's death, Bayfordbury became the home of the John Innes Horticultural Institution.

== Family ==
On 11 May 1920 Clinton-Baker married Rosa Agnes Henderson MBE, who in March that year had been honoured for war work with Queen Mary's Needlework Guild. The ceremony took place in the chapel of Royal Foundation of St Katharine, at that time on a site near Regent's Park, London; her younger sister Jessie Marguerite had married in 1913 Geoffrey Arbuthnot RN. Their father was the late William Henderson (1842–1910), of Berkley House, Berkley, Somerset, near Frome, who died in 1910 at age 67. A son of the Manchester merchant Charles Paton Henderson, senior, he had been a merchant in China. The mother of the family of three daughters and a son was Jessie Dennistoun Bankier, daughter of William Bankier of Glasgow. The couple were married in 1888.

The couple had a son William Lewis Clinton-Baker (born 1921), and a daughter Jean.

Military offices
Preceded by Sir Hugh Tothill	Commander-in-Chief, East Indies Station; 1921–1923	Succeeded by Sir Herbert Richmond
