= USS Sanderling (AM-37) =

Minesweeper of the United States Navy

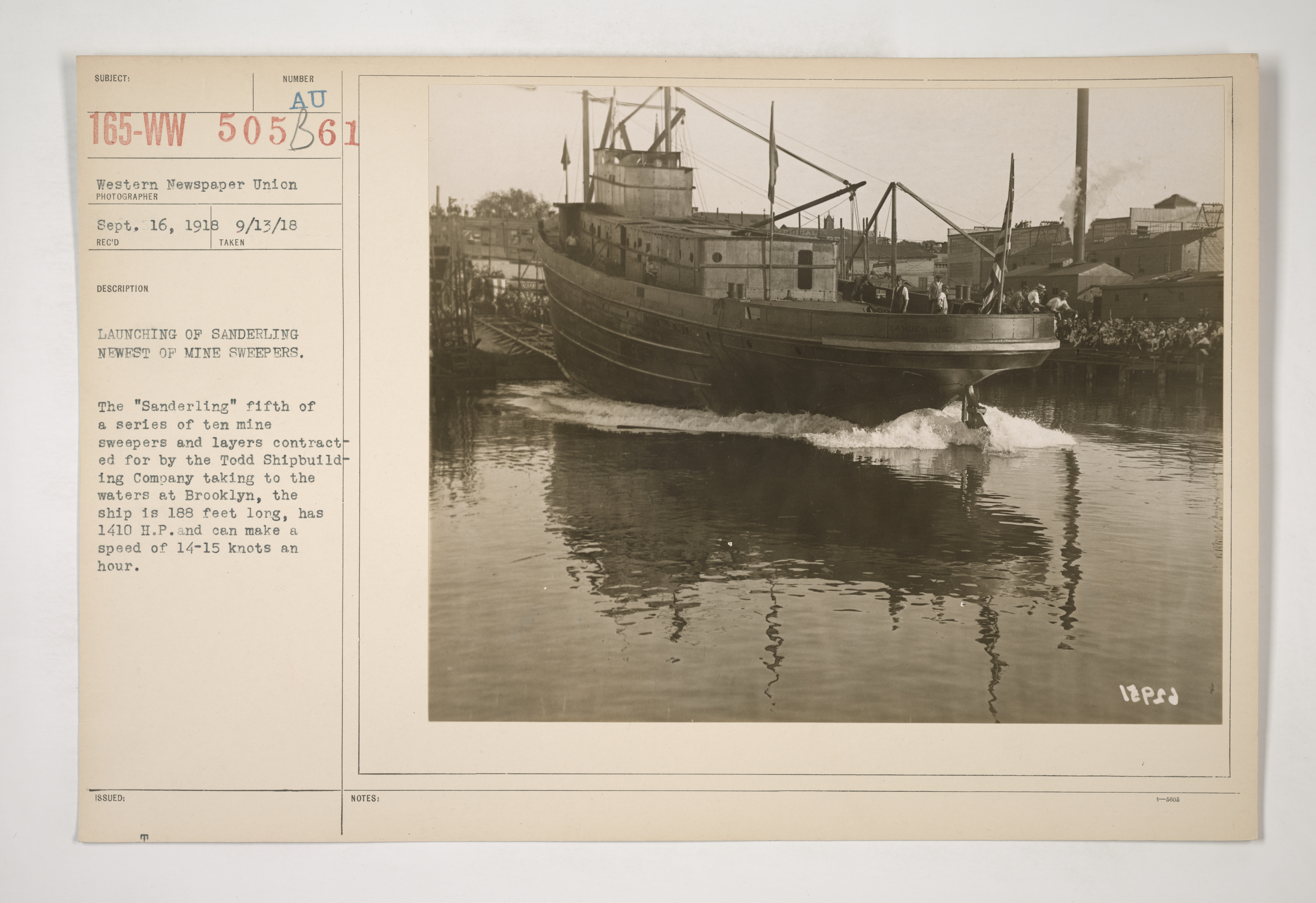
- Sandering being launched.

History

United States
- Name: USS Sanderling
- Laid down: 27 May 1918
- Launched: 2 September 1918
- Commissioned: 4 December 1918, as Minesweeper No.37
- Decommissioned: 2 May 1922
- Reclassified: AM-37, 17 July 1920
- Stricken: 26 June 1937
- Fate: Accidentally sunk, 26 June 1937

General characteristics
- Class & type: Lapwing-class minesweeper
- Displacement: 840 long tons (850 t)
- Length: 187 ft 10 in (57.25 m)
- Beam: 35 ft 6 in (10.82 m)
- Draft: 10 ft 4 in (3.15 m)
- Speed: 14 kn (16 mph; 26 km/h)
- Complement: 78
- Armament: 2 × 3 in (76 mm) guns

USS Sanderling (AM-37) was an Lapwing-class minesweeper acquired by the United States Navy for the dangerous task of removing mines from minefields laid in the water to prevent ships from passing.

Sanderling, Minesweeper No. 37, was laid down on 27 May 1918 at the Tebo Yacht Basin by the Todd Shipbuilding Co., New York City; launched on 2 September 1918; and commissioned on 4 December 1918.

== World War I mine clearance ==
Commissioned after the end of World War I, Sanderling conducted exercises and performed miscellaneous towing operations out of Tompkinsville, New York, through January and February 1919. In March, she proceeded to Boston, Massachusetts, whence she sailed on 14 April for the Orkney Islands to join in the postwar sweeping operations to clear the North Sea for peacetime shipping.

On the 29th, the day she arrived at Kirkwall, the first sweeping operation in the American-laid fields began. Experimental in nature, that sweep disposed of only 221 mines and put hardly a dent in the barrage which had been stretched from Orkney to Norway to stop German submarine traffic from going into the Atlantic Ocean. The six following sweeps used different methods, improved equipment, and more ships — including Sanderling. These modified operations proved to be more productive.

During the third operation, in June, Sanderling and Heron, operating together, located a sunken U-boat. The submarine, probably U-127, fouled their sweep gear, almost stopping the two ships, and sent oil to the surface. Sweeping operations were soon resumed and continued more "routinely," if hazardously, for Sanderling until the sixth operation in August and early September. Influenza struck the mine force as it worked the eastern end of the barrage. Soon thereafter, Sanderling was damaged by an upper level countermine. Repairs, however, were effected quickly, and the ship was ready to return to sea as the final clearance sweeps were conducted.

== Return to East Coast operations ==
By 1 October, the North Sea Mine Barrage, originally a concentration of over 70,000 British and American mines, had been swept; and Sanderling headed home. Moving south, then west, she returned to Tompkinsville, New York on 19 November. On the 25th, the North Sea Mine Force was disbanded, and Sanderling proceeded to Charleston, South Carolina for an extended overhaul.

== West Coast operations ==
Designated AM-37 on 17 July 1920, she departed the South Carolina coast on 3 August; moved up to Norfolk, Virginia; and on the 31st sailed for California. She conducted exercises en route; arrived at San Diego, California on 28 October; and remained in Californian waters until January 1921. She then proceeded west, arriving on the 21st at her new home port, Pearl Harbor.

== Deactivation and accidental sinking ==
Sanderling remained active only until 11 May, when she was placed in reduced commission. A year later, on 2 May 1922, she was decommissioned and berthed with the reserve fleet at Pearl Harbor. On 26 June 1937, while still in reserve, the minesweeper accidentally sank. Her name was struck from the Naval Vessel Register, effective on the day of her loss.
