= USS Oriole (AM-7) =

Minesweeper of the United States Navy

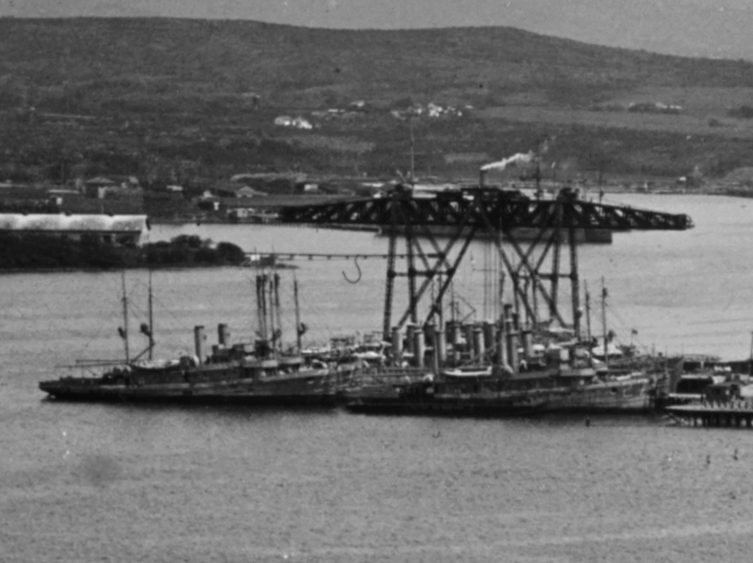
- USS Oriole at Pearl Harbor; she is the leftmost ship

History

United States
- Name: USS Oriole
- Builder: Staten Island Shipbuilding Co., New York Todd Shipyard Co., New York
- Laid down: 6 March 1918
- Launched: 3 July 1918
- Commissioned: 5 November 1918, as Minesweeper No.7
- Decommissioned: 3 May 1922
- Recommissioned: 15 August 1938
- Decommissioned: 6 February 1946
- Reclassified: AM-7, 17 July 1920; AT-136, 1 June 1942; ATO-136, 15 May 1944
- Fate: Scrapped

General characteristics
- Class & type: Lapwing-class minesweeper
- Displacement: 950 long tons (965 t) full
- Length: 187 ft 10 in (57.25 m)
- Beam: 35 ft 6 in (10.82 m)
- Draft: 10 ft 3 in (3.12 m)
- Speed: 14 knots (26 km/h; 16 mph)
- Complement: 62
- Armament: 2 × 3 in (76 mm) guns; 2 × machine guns

USS Oriole (AM-7) was a Lapwing-class minesweeper acquired by the U.S. Navy for the dangerous task of removing mines from minefields laid in the water to prevent ships from passing.

== Construction and commissioning ==
Oriole (Minesweeper No. 7) was laid down on 6 March 1918 at Port Richmond, New York, by the Staten Island Shipbuilding Co.; launched on 3 July 1918; sponsored by Miss Dorothy Leaverton, daughter of an employee of the builders' engineering department, and commissioned at the New York Navy Yard on 5 November 1918.

== North Sea operations ==
After a shaking-down period engaged in minesweeping operations off the Atlantic Coast, the new ship was assigned to the force assigned the monumental task of sweeping the North Sea Mine Barrage. Consequently, Oriole proceeded to the Orkney Islands, and arrived at Kirkwall on 29 April 1919. She then spent 112 days in the minefields (punctuated by 41 days in port), and her sailors' efforts accounted for 1,925 mines.

== Assigned to the Pacific Fleet ==
Assigned then to the U.S. Pacific Fleet, Oriole operated out of Pearl Harbor, in the 14th Naval District, for the next four years, during which time she received the alphanumeric hull number AM-7 on 17 July 1920. With the reduction in naval forces mandated by the Washington Naval Treaty of 6 February 1922, however, she was decommissioned at Pearl Harbor on 3 May 1922 and placed in reserve.

== Reactivation after decommissioning ==
On 2 May 1938, Oriole was placed in ordinary (a non-commissioned status) at the Mare Island Navy Yard to replace sister ship Swallow (AM-4) in the 13th Naval District. Oriole was re-commissioned on 15 August 1938. She then spent the next three years operating out of the Puget Sound Navy Yard, Bremerton, Washington.

== World War II Pacific operations ==
Oriole stood north from Seattle, Washington, on 22 October 1941 for duty in Alaskan waters, and arrived at Dutch Harbor on 3 November to begin vital support operations in those waters that lasted through the entrance of the United States into hostilities in December 1941 and continued until the end of World War II in 1945. She was assigned to the Northwest Sea Frontier Force on 15 July 1942 following her reclassification to Ocean Tug AT-136 on 1 June. From 22 October 1942 to 11 January 1943 the ship conducted rescue, then salvage of the dynamite laden Russian freighter SS Turksib with divers from USN CB 4, five men from CB 8. The destroyer Abner Read (DD-526) was mined off Kiska on 15 August 1943. Oriole towed her back to Bremerton for repair.

Ultimately assigned to the Alaska Sea Frontier on 15 April 1944, Oriole returned north for her last year of service as an ocean tug, proceeding from Adak to Kodiak to Kiska, Alaska. On 15 May 1944 she was redesignated ATO-136. After towing the floating workshop YR-78 from Kodiak to the U.S. Naval shipyard at Tongue Point, Oregon (16–24 October 1945) Oriole remained in 13th Naval District waters awaiting disposition.

== Final decommissioning ==
Decommissioned on 6 February 1946 at the Puget Sound Naval Shipyard, Oriole was stricken from the Naval Vessel Register on 12 March 1946. Delivered to the Maritime Commission on 6 January 1947, she was sold that same day to M. E. Baker, who took possession of her on 8 January 1947 at Scow Bay, Kilisut Harbor, Marrowstone, Washington. She was scrapped at Port Glasgow on 27 March 1952.
