= AM4 =

AM4 or AM-4 may refer to:

- Socket AM4, a socket for AMD processors utilizing the Zen microarchitecture
- Amusement Vision, video game developer formerly known as Sega-AM4
- USS Swallow (AM-4), a U.S. Navy minesweeper
- Ekspress-AM4, a Russian satellite that never reached its intended orbit
- AAA battery, alternately called AM4)
- AM-2201, a synthetic cannabinoid alternately called AM4)
- British Rail Class 304 train, originally known as class AM4
