= USS Avocet (AVP-4) =

Minesweeper of the United States Navy

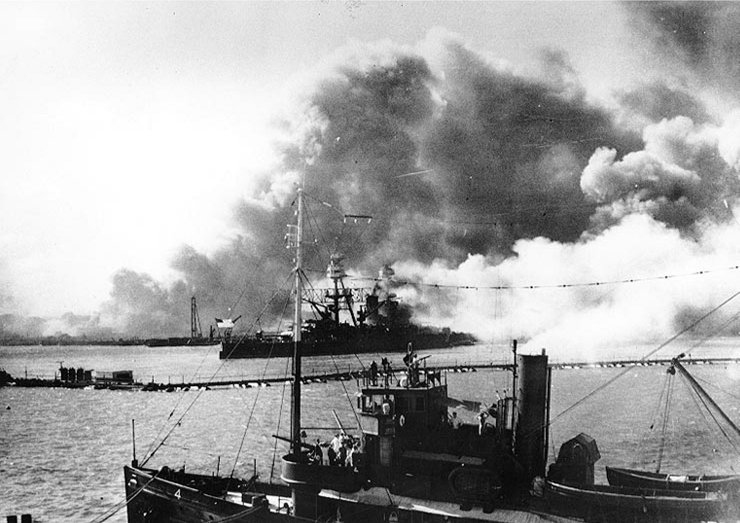
- USS Avocet in foreground during the Attack on Pearl Harbor. USS Nevada is in the background, with a large American flag on her stern.

History

United States
- Builder: Baltimore Drydock and Shipbuilding Co.
- Cost: $766,914 (hull and machinery)
- Laid down: 13 September 1917
- Launched: 9 March 1918
- Commissioned: 17 September 1918; 8 September 1925
- Decommissioned: 10 December 1945
- Reclassified: AM-19 to AVP-4 8 September 1925
- Stricken: 3 January 1946
- Honours and awards: Avocet (AVP-4) earned one World War II battle star for her participation in the defense of the fleet at Pearl Harbor on 7 December 1941
- Fate: Sold to the Construction and Power Machine Co., Brooklyn, N.Y., on 12 December 1946 for use as a hulk.

General characteristics
- Class & type: Lapwing-class minesweeper
- Displacement: 840 tons (853 tonnes) as AVP-4
- Length: 187 ft 10 in (57.25 m)
- Beam: 35 ft 5 in (10.80 m)
- Draught: 15 ft (4.6 m)
- Propulsion: Triple Reciprocating engine
- Speed: 14 kn
- Complement: 75
- Armament: 2 × 3"/50 caliber guns
- Armor: None

USS Avocet (AM-19/AVP-4) was a Lapwing-class minesweeper. Avocet was commissioned at the Norfolk Navy Yard, on 17 September 1918, as a minesweeper. Recommissioned on 8 September 1925 as a small seaplane tender, USS Avocet (AVP-4) was present during the Pearl Harbor attack on 7 December 1941. The ship survived the war, and was sold as a hulk on 6 December 1946. In June, 1937, USS Avocet carried a science team to Canton Island (in the Phoenix Islands, midway between Hawaii and Fiji, at the time a British Protectorate) for the total solar eclipse. There, Avocet and HMS Wellington, carrying a British science team, fired shots across each other's bows in a dispute over the choice anchorage of the island that the Americans, arriving first, had claimed. The dispute was quickly smoothed over by both governments.

== Avocet's role in the Attack on Pearl Harbor ==
At about 07:45 on Sunday, 7 December 1941, Avocet's security watch reported Japanese planes bombing the seaplane hangars at the south end of Ford Island and sounded general quarters. Her crew promptly brought up ammunition to her guns and the ship opened fire. The first shot from Avocet's starboard 3 in (76.2 mm) gun scored a direct hit on a Nakajima B5N2 ("Kate") carrier attack plane that had just scored a torpedo hit on the battleship USS California, moored nearby. The "Kate", from the aircraft carrier Kaga's air group, caught fire, slanted down from the sky, and crashed on the grounds of the naval hospital, one of five such planes lost by Kaga that morning.

Initially firing at torpedo planes, Avocet's gunners shifted their focus to dive bombers attacking ships in the drydock area at the beginning of the forenoon watch. Then, sighting high altitude bombers overhead, they shifted their fire again. Soon afterwards five bombs splashed in a nearby berth, but none exploded.

From her veritable ringside seat, Avocet then witnessed the sortie of the battleship USS Nevada, the only ship of her type to get underway during the attack. Seeing the dreadnought underway, after clearing her berth astern of the burning battleship USS Arizona, dive-bomber pilots from Kaga singled her out for destruction, 21 planes attacking her from all points of the compass. Avocet's captain, Lieutenant William C. Jonson Jr., marveled at the Japanese precision, writing later that he had never seen "a more perfectly executed attack." Avocet's gunners added to the barrage to cover the battleship's passage down the harbor.

Although the ship ceased fire at 10:00, much work remained in the wake of the devastating surprise attack. She had expended 144 rounds of 3 in (76.2 mm) and 1,750 of .30 in (7.62 mm) ammunition in the battle against the attacking planes, and had suffered only two casualties: a box of ammunition coming up from the magazines had fallen on the foot of one man, and a piece of flying shrapnel had wounded another. Also during the course of the action, a sailor from the small seaplane tender USS Swan, unable to return to his own ship, had reported on board for duty, and was immediately assigned a station on a .30 in (7.62 mm) machine gun.

Oil from ruptured battleship fuel tanks had been set afire by fires on those ships, and the wind, from the northeast, was slowly pushing it toward Avocet's berth. Accordingly, the seaplane tender got underway at 10:45, and moored temporarily to the magazine island dock at 11:10, awaiting further orders which were not long in coming. At 11:15, she was ordered to help quell the fires still blazing on board California. She spent 20 minutes fighting fires on board the battleship with the submarine rescue ship USS Widgeon, and was then directed to proceed elsewhere.

Leaving California at 12:15, she reached the side of Nevada 25 minutes later, ordered to assist in beaching the battleship and fighting her fires. Mooring to Nevada's port bow at 12:40, Avocet went slowly ahead, pushing her aground at channel buoy no. 19, with fire hoses led out to her forward spaces and her signal bridge. For two hours, Avocet fought Nevada's fires, and succeeded in putting them out.
