= USS Widgeon (AM-22) =

Minesweeper of the United States Navy

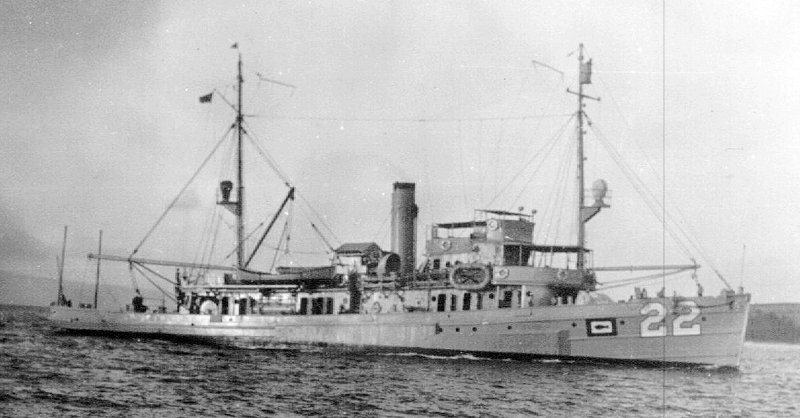
- USS Widgeon (AM-22) ca. 1926, photographed from the deck of an R-class submarine at Hawaii.

History

United States
- Name: USS Widgeon
- Builder: Sun Shipbuilding and Drydock Company; Chester, Pennsylvania
- Laid down: 8 October 1917
- Launched: 5 May 1918
- Sponsored by: Mildred Moyer
- Commissioned: 27 July 1918
- Reclassified: From Minesweeper No.22 to AM-22, 17 July 1920
- Decommissioned: 15 April 1922
- Recommissioned: 5 March 1923
- Decommissioned: 5 February 1947
- Reclassified: ASR-1, 22 January 1936
- Stricken: 23 December 1947
- Honors and awards: 1 battle star (World War II)
- Fate: Sold for scrapping, 1948

General characteristics
- Class & type: Lapwing-class minesweeper
- Displacement: 950 long tons (970 t)
- Length: 187 ft 10 in (57.25 m)
- Beam: 35 ft 6 in (10.82 m)
- Draft: 9 ft 9 in (2.97 m)
- Speed: 14 kn (16 mph; 26 km/h)
- Complement: 85
- Armament: 2 × 3 in (76 mm) guns

USS Widgeon (AM-22/ASR-1) was an Lapwing-class minesweeper acquired by the United States Navy for the dangerous task of removing mines from minefields laid in the water to prevent ships from passing. Later converted to a submarine rescue ship. Widgeon was named by the Navy after the widgeon, a freshwater duck.

== Construction and commissioning ==
Widgeon (Minesweeper No. 22) was laid down on 8 October 1917 at Chester, Pennsylvania, by the Sun Shipbuilding Co.; launched on 5 May 1918; sponsored by Ms. Mildred Moyer; and commissioned on 27 July 1918.

== Service history ==
=== World War I ===
Widgeon served with Minesweeping Group 2 of the Atlantic Fleet during the last months of World War I. After the armistice, she was assigned to the North Sea Minesweeping Detachment and departed Boston, Massachusetts, on 28 June 1919, bound for Scotland. Arriving at Kirkwall on 10 July, Widgeon operated in the North Sea between Scotland and Norway, sweeping up mines sown by the Allies the year before to deter the German High Seas Fleet. These duties – often difficult and dangerous – kept the minesweeper occupied through the summer of 1919. Following the conclusion of the operation, Widgeon headed home – via Brest, France; Ponta Delgada, Azores; and Hamilton, Bermuda – and arrived at New York on 19 November 1919.

=== U.S. East Coast ===
Widgeon operated off the United States East Coast through 1921. During this period, on 17 July 1920, she was designated AM-22. Selected for conversion to a salvage vessel for duty on the Pacific coast, the minesweeper was decommissioned at Charleston, South Carolina on 15 April 1922. She underwent conversion at the Charleston Navy Yard and was recommissioned there on 5 March 1923.

Despite her new equipment, the ship retained her minesweeper designation. In a departmental letter of 21 November 1923, the Navy's Bureau of Construction and Repair specified that Widgeon's equipment be utilized to determine "their exact capabilities in salvage work." Furthermore, "Widgeon should be considered available for salvage or rescue work and the Commander, Submarine Divisions, Pacific, is authorized to send... Widgeon to render such service when needed."

=== Pacific operations ===
Operating out of Pearl Harbor, Territory of Hawaii, Widgeon served as the primary submarine rescue vessel for the Hawaiian area. During this time, she proved her versatility by recovering practice mines or torpedoes and served as a training ship for fleet divers. In late October 1925, she collided with the submarine USS R-8; R-8 suffered the loss of her periscopes, the destruction of her bridge, and damage to her radio antenna supports.

In 1926, Widgeon was extensively altered to increase her capabilities as a submarine rescue vessel (ASR). She finally was reclassified ASR-1 on 22 January 1936, over a decade after she began operating as such. On 16 July 1929 Widgeon came alongside of USS Burns and its divers replaced a damaged propeller underwater. It is believed that this was the first instance of work of this kind was accomplished.

Widgeon continued her routine operations out of Pearl Harbor throughout the late 1930s.

=== World War II ===
On 7 December 1941, the submarine rescue vessel lay alongside a berth at the submarine base at Pearl Harbor, when the Japanese attacked. Despite keeping up a steady defensive fire with rifles and machine guns during the attack, Widgeon's crewmen did not claim to down any of the attackers. After the enemy planes left, Widgeon set course for Ford Island to begin salvage operations on the overturned USS Oklahoma. When she reached Battleship Row, she found that burning oil spewing from the shattered tanks on USS Arizona was threatening the ships nested immediately ahead, USS Tennessee and the torpedoed USS West Virginia. Under orders from the Commander, Battle Force, Widgeon assisted USS Tern and Garbage Lighter USS YG-17 in fighting the fires.

Widgeon subsequently took part in salvaging USS Nevada, USS California, and Oklahoma. Her work on Nevada earned the ship a commendation from Commander, Battle Force, and her divers conducted numerous dives into the darkened and treacherous interiors of the sunken battleships. When this work was well in hand and her service in that capacity was no longer required, Widgeon returned to her duties with the submarines of the Pacific Fleet. She towed targets for gunnery exercises and served as a target during torpedo-firing drills. She also recovered practice torpedoes at the conclusion of the day's training activities.

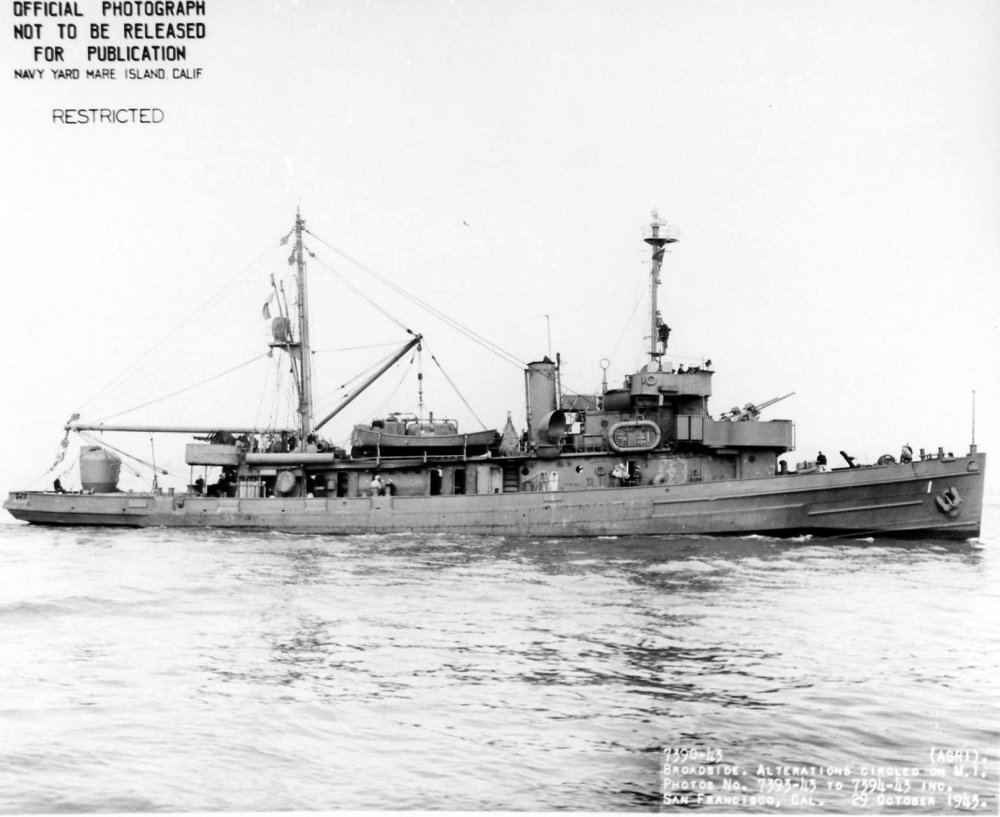
Widgeon off San Francisco, California on 29 October 1943.

Widgeon operated in this capacity from April 1942-7 September 1943, when she got underway for the California coast. Arriving at San Diego on 18 September, she operated off the West Coast as a torpedo recovery and submarine rescue ship into the spring of 1944, when she was relieved by USS Ortolan. In May, Widgeon returned to Pearl Harbor and resumed her operations as the Hawaiian-based submarine rescue vessel. She continued this duty through the end of the war in the Pacific and into November 1945, after which time she completed another tour at San Diego.

=== Operation Crossroads ===
In the summer of 1946, Widgeon – as part of Task Unit 1.2.7, the salvage unit of Joint Task Force 1 – supported Operation Crossroads, the atomic bomb tests at Bikini Atoll.

== Decommissioning ==
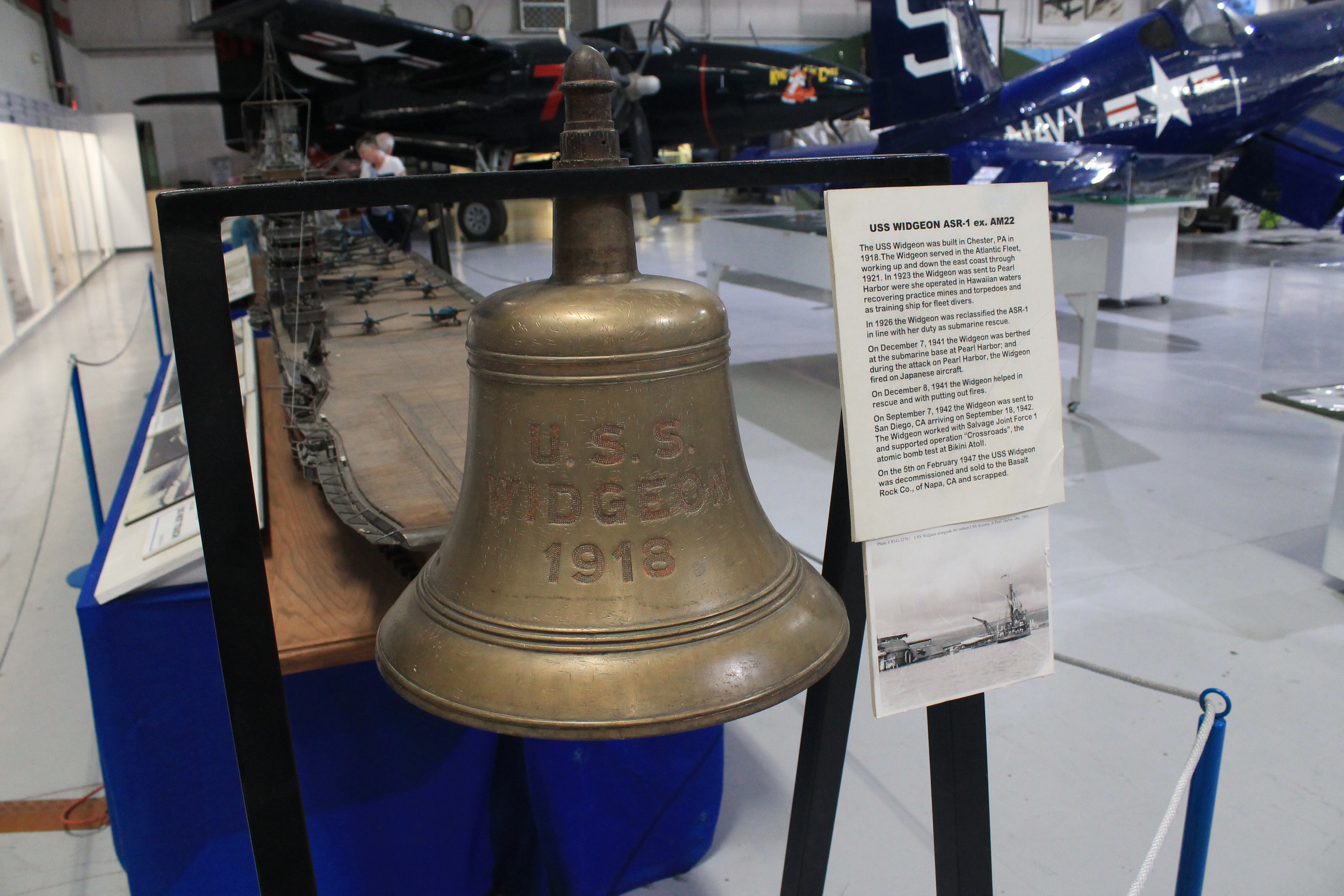
Widgeon's bell preserved at the Palm Springs Air Museum

Subsequently, returning to the West Coast, Widgeon was decommissioned on 5 February 1947 and struck from the Naval Vessel Register on 23 December. Soon thereafter, she was sold to the Basalt Rock Co., of Napa, California, on 5 March 1948 and scrapped.

== Commemoration ==
Widgeon's ship's bell has been preserved, and as of 2018 it is on display at the Palm Springs Air Museum in Palm Springs, California.

== Awards ==
- World War I Victory Medal with "MINESWEEPER" clasp
- American Defense Service Medal with "FLEET" clasp
- Asiatic-Pacific Campaign Medal with one battle star
- American Campaign Medal
- World War II Victory Medal
