= USS Peacock (AM-46) =

Minesweeper of the United States Navy

History

United States
- Namesake: Male Indian peafowl (peacock)
- Builder: Staten Island Shipbuilding Company, Staten Island, New York City
- Laid down: 31 August 1918
- Launched: 8 April 1919
- Sponsored by: Miss A.M. Danner
- Commissioned: 27 December 1919
- Decommissioned: 14 February 1920
- Stricken: 22 April 1941
- Fate: Sunk after collision, 24 August 1940

General characteristics
- Class & type: Lapwing-class minesweeper
- Displacement: 840 long tons (853 t)
- Length: 187 ft 10 in (57.25 m)
- Beam: 35 ft 5 in (10.80 m)
- Draft: 8 ft 10 in (2.69 m)
- Propulsion: Triple expansion reciprocating steam engine; 2 × Babcock & Wilcox boilers; 1 shaft
- Speed: 14 knots (26 km/h; 16 mph)
- Complement: 85 officers and enlisted
- Armament: 2 × 3"/50 caliber guns

USS Peacock (AM-46) was a Lapwing-class minesweeper built for the United States Navy during World War I.

Peacock was laid down on 31 August 1918 by Staten Island Shipbuilding Company of Staten Island, New York; launched on 8 April 1919; sponsored by Miss A.M. Danner; and commissioned on 27 December 1919.

After fitting out, Peacock remained at her berth at the New York Navy Yard until decommissioned 14 February 1920 and loaned to the Shipping Board on the same date. Converted to a salvage tug, Peacock served under charter to the Shipping Board and various commercial activities until 24 August 1940 when she collided with the Norwegian merchantman SS Hindanger off Cartagena, Colombia, and sank. She was struck from the Naval Vessel Register on 22 April 1941.
