= USS Partridge (AM-16) =

Minesweeper of the United States Navy

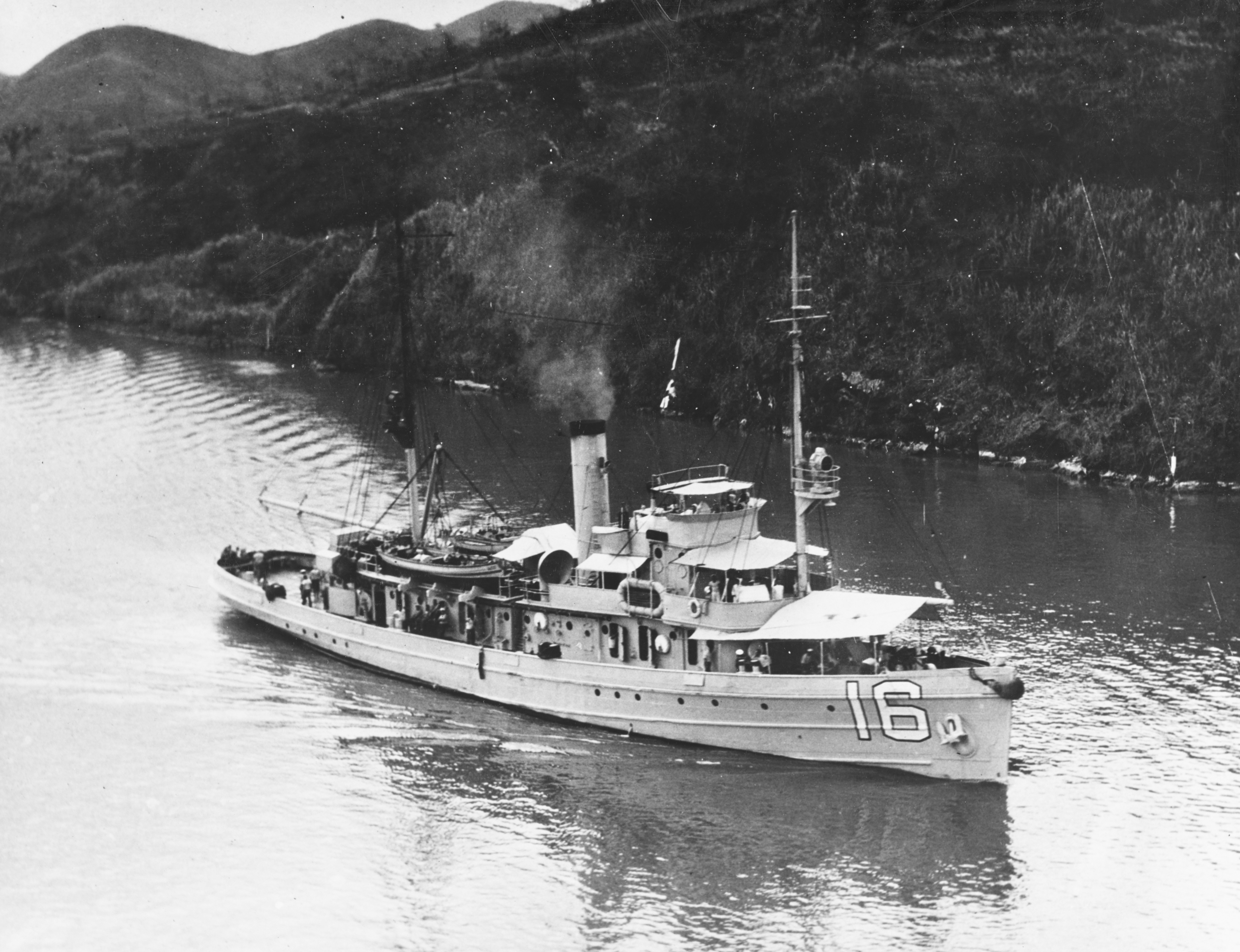
- USS Partridge

History

United States
- Name: USS Partridge
- Builder: Chester Shipbuilding Co., Chester, Pennsylvania
- Laid down: 14 May 1918
- Launched: 15 October 1918
- Commissioned: 17 June 1919, as Minesweeper No.16
- Reclassified: AM-16, 17 July 1920; AT-138, 1 June 1942; ATO-138, 15 May 1944
- Stricken: 29 July 1944
- Fate: Sunk by torpedo, 11 June 1944

General characteristics
- Class & type: Lapwing-class minesweeper
- Displacement: 950 long tons (965 t)
- Length: 187 ft 10 in (57.25 m)
- Beam: 35 ft 6 in (10.82 m)
- Draft: 9 ft 9 in (2.97 m)
- Speed: 14 kn (16 mph; 26 km/h)
- Complement: 72
- Armament: 2 × 3 in (76 mm)/50 cal dual purpose guns

USS Partridge (AM-16) was an Lapwing-class minesweeper acquired by the United States Navy for the dangerous task of removing mines from minefields laid in the water to prevent ships from passing.

Partridge was named after the partridge, any of various gallinaceous birds, such as the ruffed grouse or bob-white quail, found in North America.

Partridge was laid down on 14 May 1918 by the Chester Shipbuilding Co., Chester, Pennsylvania: launched on 15 October 1918; sponsored by Ms. C. H. McCay; and commissioned on 17 June 1919.

== Post-World War I operations ==
Completed too late to participate in World War I, Partridge operated in the Pacific Ocean until returning to the Atlantic Ocean in June 1941. Converted to an ocean-going tug, Partridge was reclassified AT-138 on 1 June 1942. The tug participated in rescue and towing duties along the eastern seaboard and in the Caribbean, making an important contribution to saving lives and ships, until early May 1944.

== World War II operations ==
Reclassified ATO-138 on 15 May 1944, Partridge was ordered to England to assist in preparing for the coming invasion of Normandy. The ship remained in England until 10 June, when she was ordered to sail for the beachhead.

En route to France, at position 49°30′N 00°50′W, some 11 nmi (13 mi; 20 km) north of Vierville-sur-Mer, the veteran minesweeper was hit by a torpedo from a German E-Boat at 02:00 on 11 June and sank some 35 minutes later.

Partridge was struck from the Naval Vessel Register on 29 July 1944.
