= Lapwing-class minesweeper =

1918 class of minesweepers of the United States Navy

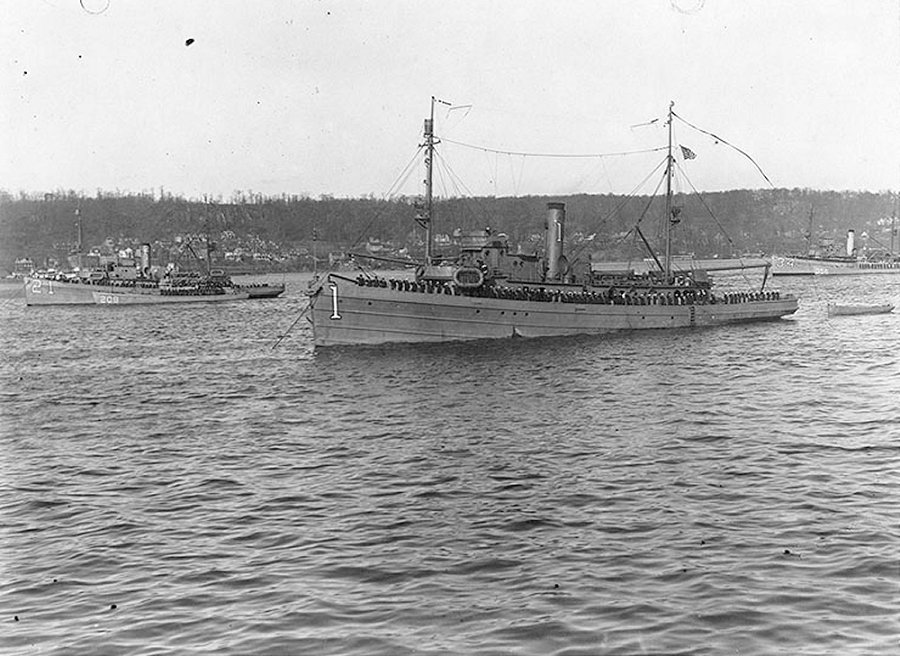
- USS Lapwing (AM-1) and other ships of the squadron anchored in the Hudson River, off New York City

Class overview
- Operators: United States Navy
- Succeeded by: Raven-class minesweeper
- Built: 1917–1919
- In commission: 1918–1953
- Planned: 51
- Completed: 49
- Cancelled: 2
- Lost: 16
- Retired: 35
- Preserved: 0
- Notes: Although technically not "preserved", USS Auk has been abandoned in Venezuela since 1962 and is still there in its original configuration albeit partially sunk.

General characteristics
- Type: Minesweeper
- Displacement: 840 long tons (853 t)
- Length: 187 ft 10 in (57.25 m)
- Beam: 35 ft 5 in (10.80 m)
- Draft: 15 ft (4.6 m)
- Propulsion: Reciprocating engine
- Speed: 14 knots (16 mph; 26 km/h)
- Complement: 75
- Armament: 2 × 3 in (76 mm)/50 caliber guns and/or 2 × .30cal machine guns

The Lapwing-class minesweeper, often called the Bird class, was an early "AM-type" oceangoing minesweeper of the United States Navy. Seven ships of the class were commissioned during World War I, and served well into the 1950s. A number were refitted to serve as ocean-going tugs, salvage vessels, seaplane tenders, or submarine rescue ships.

The propulsion system consisted of 2 Babcock & Wilcox 200psi boilers and a 1,400shp Harlan and Hollingsworth triple expansion reciprocating steam engine.

== Ships ==
The table makes no distinction between classification as "Minesweeper No. X" and "AM-X". This change affected all boats equally ca. 1920.

All boats reclassified as Fleet Tugs (AT) where later again reclassified as Fleet Tug, Old (ATO) (ca. 1944). The table treats them the same. Brant and Grebe were never reclassified as ATO.

Ship name	Hull number	Builder	Commissioned	Decommissioned	Fate
Lapwing	AM-1	Todd Brooklyn	12 Jun 1918	11 Apr 1922	Sold, 19 August 1946; fate unknown
Lapwing	AVP-1	Todd Brooklyn	1 Sep 1932	29 Nov 1945	Sold, 19 August 1946; fate unknown
Owl	AM-2	Todd Brooklyn	11 Jul 1918		Sold for scrap, 27 June 1947
Owl	AT-137	Todd Brooklyn	1 Jun 1942	26 Jul 1946	Sold for scrap, 27 June 1947
Robin	AM-3	Todd Brooklyn	29 Aug 1918		Sold for scrap, 1945
Robin	AT-140	Todd Brooklyn	1 Jun 1942	9 Nov 1945	Sold for scrap, 1945
Swallow	AM-4	Todd Brooklyn	8 Oct 1918	n/a	Ran aground, 19 February 1938; later sank
Tanager	AM-5	Staten Island Shipbuilding Company	28 Jun 1918	n/a	Sank, 4 May 1942
Cardinal	AM-6	Staten Island Shipbuilding Company	23 Aug 1918	n/a	Ran aground, 6 June 1923; later sank
Oriole	AM-7	Staten Island Shipbuilding Company	5 Nov 1918; 15 Aug 1938	3 May 1922	Sold 1947
Oriole	AT-136	Staten Island Shipbuilding Company	1 Jun 1942	6 Feb 1946	Sold 1947
Curlew	AM-8	Staten Island Shipbuilding Company	7 Jan 1919	n/a	Ran aground, 15 December 1925; later sank
Finch	AM-9	Standard Shipbuilding Company	10 Sep 1918	n/a	Sank, 10 Apr 1942;salvaged later sunk 12 January 1945
Heron	AM-10	Standard Shipbuilding Company	30 Oct 1918; 18 Sep 1924	6 Apr 1922	Sold for scrap, 25 July 1947
Heron	AVP-2	Standard Shipbuilding Company	27 Jan 1936	12 Feb 1946	Sold for scrap, 25 July 1947
Condor	AM-11		never	never	Construction cancelled, 4 December 1918
Plover	AM-12		never	never	Construction cancelled, 4 December 1918
Turkey	AM-13	Merchant Shipbuilding Corporation	13 Dec 1918	12 Apr 1922	Sold for scrap, 30 December 1946
Turkey	AT-143	Merchant Shipbuilding Corporation	1 Jun 1942	6 Nov 1945	Sold for scrap, 30 December 1946
Woodcock	AM-14	Merchant Shipbuilding Corporation	19 Feb 1919; 21 Feb 1924	5 May 1922	Sold for scrap, 19 December 1947
Woodcock	AT-145	Merchant Shipbuilding Corporation	1 Jun 1942	30 Sep 1946	Sold for scrap, 19 December 1947
Quail	AM-15	Merchant Shipbuilding Corporation	29 Apr 1919	n/a	Scuttled to prevent capture, 5 May 1942
Partridge	AM-16	Merchant Shipbuilding Corporation	17 Jun 1919	n/a	Sank, 11 June 1944
Eider	AM-17	Pusey and Jones	23 Jan 1919	18 Apr 1922	Fate unknown
Eider	YNG-20	Pusey and Jones	7 Oct 1940	28 Nov 1945	Fate unknown
Thrush	AM-18	Pusey and Jones	25 Apr 1919	3 Apr 1922	Sold to a commercial interest, 21 August 1946; Sank, 10 March 1951
Thrush	AVP-3	Pusey and Jones	31 Oct 1935	13 Dec 1945	Sold to a commercial interest, 21 August 1946; Sank, 10 March 1951
Avocet	AM-19	Baltimore Dry Dock and Shipbuilding	17 Sep 1918; 8 Sep 1925	3 Apr 1922	Sold for scrap, 12 December 1946
Avocet	AVP-4	Baltimore Dry Dock and Shipbuilding	22 Jan 1936	10 Dec 1945	Sold for scrap, 12 December 1946
Bobolink	AM-20	Baltimore Dry Dock and Shipbuilding	28 Jan 1919		Fate unknown
Bobolink	AT-131	Baltimore Dry Dock and Shipbuilding	1 Jun 1942	22 Feb 1946	Fate unknown
Lark	AM-21	Baltimore Dry Dock and Shipbuilding	12 Apr 1919		Fate unknown
Lark	AT-168	Baltimore Dry Dock and Shipbuilding	1 Mar 1944	7 February 1946	Fate unknown
Widgeon	AM-22	Sun Shipbuilding and Drydock Company	27 Jul 1918		Sold for scrap, 5 March 1948
Widgeon	ASR-1	Sun Shipbuilding and Drydock Company	22 Jun 1936	5 Feb 1947	Sold for scrap, 5 March 1948
Teal	AM-23	Sun Shipbuilding and Drydock Company	20 Aug 1918		Fate unknown
Teal	AVP-5	Sun Shipbuilding and Drydock Company	22 Jan 1936	23 Nov 1945	Fate unknown
Brant	AM-24	Sun Shipbuilding and Drydock Company	5 Sep 1918		Fate unknown
Brant	AT-132	Sun Shipbuilding and Drydock Company	1 Jun 1942		Fate unknown
Brant	ARS-32	Sun Shipbuilding and Drydock Company	1 Sep 1942	19 Dec 1945	Fate unknown
Kingfisher	AM-25	Puget Sound Navy Yard	27 May 1918		Fate unknown
Kingfisher	AT-135	Puget Sound Navy Yard	1 Jun 1942	6 Feb 1946	Fate unknown
Rail	AM-26	Puget Sound Navy Yard	5 Jun 1918		Fate unknown
Rail	AT-139	Puget Sound Navy Yard	1 Jun 1942	29 Apr 1946	Fate unknown
Pelican	AM-27	Gas Engine and Power Company	10 Oct 1918		Sold for scrap, November 1946
Pelican	AVP-6	Gas Engine and Power Company	22 Jan 1936	30 Nov 1945	Sold for scrap, November 1946
Falcon	AM-28	Gas Engine and Power Company	12 Nov 1918		Fate unknown
Falcon	ASR-2	Gas Engine and Power Company	12 Sep 1929	18 Jun 1946	Fate unknown
Osprey	AM-29	Gas Engine and Power Company	7 Jan 1919	12 Dec 1920	Sold for scrap, 1952
Osprey	ARS-2	Gas Engine and Power Company	17 Sep 1941	13 Feb 1947	Sold for scrap, 1952
Seagull	AM-30	Gas Engine and Power Company	7 Mar 1919		Fate unknown
Seagull	AT-141	Gas Engine and Power Company	1 Jun 1942	5 Sep 1946	Fate unknown
Tern	AM-31	Gas Engine and Power Company	17 May 1919		Fate unknown
Tern	AT-142	Gas Engine and Power Company	1 Jun 1942	23 Nov 1945	Fate unknown
Flamingo	AM-32	New Jersey Dry Dock and Transportation Company	12 Feb 1919	17 Mar 1953	Sold for scrap, 22 July 1953
Penguin	AM-33	New Jersey Dry Dock and Transportation Company	21 Nov 1918	n/a	Scuttled to prevent capture, 8 December 1941
Swan	AM-34	Alabama Drydock and Shipbuilding Company	31 Jan 1919		Fate unknown
Swan	AVP-7	Alabama Drydock and Shipbuilding Company	22 Jan 1936	13 Dec 1945	Fate unknown
Whippoorwill	AM-35	Alabama Drydock and Shipbuilding Company	1 Apr 1919		Fate unknown
Whippoorwill	AT-169	Alabama Drydock and Shipbuilding Company	1 Mar 1944	17 Apr 1946	Fate unknown
Bittern	AM-36	Alabama Drydock and Shipbuilding Company	28 May 1919	n/a	Scuttled following incapacitating damage, 10 December 1941
Sanderling	AM-37	Todd Brooklyn	4 Dec 1918	2 May 1922	Accidentally sank while under tow, 26 June 1937
Auk	AM-38	Todd Brooklyn	31 Jan 1919	28 Jan 1947	Transferred to Venezuela, 9 June 1947; decommissioned in 1962 and abandoned as of 2019
Chewink	AM-39	Todd Brooklyn	9 Apr 1919	4 Feb 1947	Sunk as a target, 31 July 1947
Chewink	ASR-3	Todd Brooklyn	9 April 1919	4 February 1947	Sunk as a target, 31 July 1947
Cormorant	AM-40	Todd Brooklyn	15 May 1919	29 March 1946	Fate unknown
Cormorant	AT-133	Todd Brooklyn	15 May 1919	29 March 1946	Fate unknown
Gannet	AM-41	Todd Brooklyn	10 July 1919	n/a	Sunk, 7 June 1942
Gannet	AVP-8	Todd Brooklyn	10 July 1919	n/a	Sunk, 7 June 1942
Goshawk	AM-42		never	never	Construction cancelled, 4 December 1918
Grebe	AM-43	Staten Island Shipbuilding Company	1 May 1919	n/a	Ran aground, 6 December 1942; destroyed by hurricane, 1–2 January 1943
Grebe	AT-134	Staten Island Shipbuilding Company	1 May 1919	n/a	Ran aground, 6 December 1942; destroyed by hurricane, 1–2 January 1943
Mallard	AM-44	Staten Island Shipbuilding Company	25 Jun 1919	10 Dec 1946	Sunk as a target, 22 May 1947
Mallard	ASR-4	Staten Island Shipbuilding Company	25 Jun 1919	10 Dec 1946	Sunk as a target, 22 May 1947
Ortolan	AM-45	Staten Island Shipbuilding Company	17 Sep 1919	18 Mar 1947	Fate unknown
Ortolan	ASR-5	Staten Island Shipbuilding Company	17 Sep 1919	18 Mar 1947	Fate unknown
Peacock	AM-46	Staten Island Shipbuilding Company	27 Dec 1919	n/a	Sunk, 24 August 1940
Pigeon	AM-47	Baltimore Dry Dock and Shipbuilding	15 July 1919	n/a	Sunk, 4 May 1942
Pigeon	ASR-6	Baltimore Dry Dock and Shipbuilding	15 July 1919	n/a	Sunk, 4 May 1942
Redwing	AM-48	Baltimore Dry Dock and Shipbuilding	17 October 1919	n/a	Sunk, 29 June 1943
Redwing	ARS-4	Baltimore Dry Dock and Shipbuilding	17 October 1919	n/a	Sunk, 29 June 1943
Raven	AM-49		never	never	Construction cancelled, 4 December 1918
Shrike	AM-50		never	never	Construction cancelled, 4 December 1918
Sandpiper	AM-51	Philadelphia Navy Yard	9 October 1919	10 December 1945	Fate unknown
Sandpiper	AVP-9	Philadelphia Navy Yard	9 October 1919	10 December 1945	Fate unknown
Vireo	AM-52	Philadelphia Navy Yard	16 October 1919	18 April 1946	Fate unknown
Vireo	AT-144	Philadelphia Navy Yard	16 October 1919	18 April 1946	Fate unknown
Warbler	AM-53	Philadelphia Navy Yard	22 December 1919	29 March 1946	Fate unknown
Warbler	ARS-11	Philadelphia Navy Yard	22 December 1919	29 March 1946	Fate unknown
Willet	AM-54	Philadelphia Navy Yard	29 January 1920	1 December 1947	Sold for scrap 2 November 1948
Willet	ARS-12	Philadelphia Navy Yard	29 January 1920	1 December 1947	Sold for scrap 2 November 1948
