= USS Chewink (AM-39) =

Minesweeper of the United States Navy

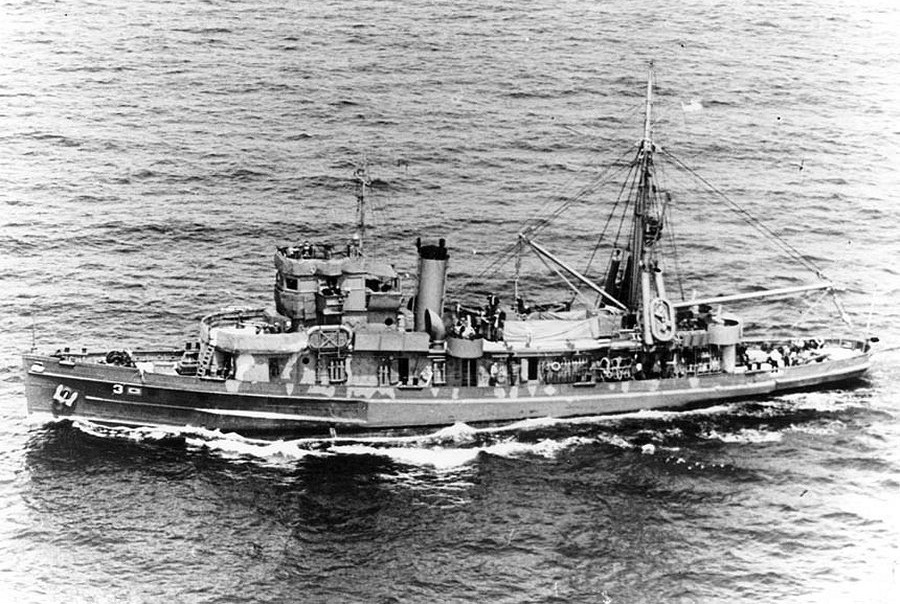
- Chewink (ASR-3) seen on 30 June 1942

History

United States
- Name: USS Chewink
- Builder: Todd Shipyard Corp., New York City
- Launched: 21 December 1918
- Commissioned: 9 April 1919, as Minesweeper No.39
- Decommissioned: 21 August 1933
- Reclassified: AM-39, 17 July 1920; ASR-3, 12 September 1929
- Recommissioned: 12 November 1940
- Decommissioned: 4 February 1947
- Fate: Sunk as a target off New London, 31 July 1947

General characteristics
- Class & type: Lapwing-class minesweeper
- Displacement: 950 long tons (965 t)
- Length: 187 ft 10 in (57.25 m)
- Beam: 35 ft 6 in (10.82 m)
- Draft: 9 ft 9 in (2.97 m)
- Speed: 14 knots (26 km/h; 16 mph)
- Complement: 78
- Armament: 2 × 3 in (76 mm) guns

The first USS Chewink (AM-39/ASR-3) was a Lapwing-class minesweeper in the United States Navy. She was later converted to a submarine rescue ship.

Chewink was launched 21 December 1918 by Todd Shipyard Corp., New York City; sponsored by Miss M. Sperrin; and commissioned 9 April 1919. She was reclassified ASR-3 on 12 September 1929.

== North Sea mine clearance operations ==
Chewink sailed from Boston, Massachusetts, 23 May 1919 for Kirkwall, Orkney Islands, arriving 5 July to aid in the vast task of clearing the North Sea minefields.

== U.S. East Coast operations ==
She returned via Lisbon, the Azores, and Bermuda to New York, arriving 19 November, and for the next 11 years operated along the east coast and to Cuba and Puerto Rico in a variety of duties, which included salvage, target towing, a school for Naval Engineering, recovering mines, experimental underwater radio tests, net laying and tending, and tending submarines.

== U.S. West Coast operations ==
In October 1930 she sailed from New London, Connecticut, with Submarine Division 4 for Pearl Harbor, to be stationed there as submarine tender, until 5 January 1931, and then at Coco Solo, Panama Canal Zone until August 1933. Chewink was decommissioned at Pearl Harbor 21 August 1933, remaining there until April 1937, when her berth was changed to Mare Island Navy Yard.

== World War II East Coast operations ==
Chewink recommissioned 12 November 1940, sailed from San Diego, California, 3 February 1941, and on 10 May reached New London, Connecticut, her base through the remainder of her active service. During World War II, she aided America's growing ability to make war beneath the sea as she operated training divers, in submarine search and rescue exercises, as a station ship, and as a target ship for submarine torpedoes. Her operations took her to Halifax, Nova Scotia, and Argentia, Newfoundland, and several times to Key West, Florida.

== End-of-War decommissioning ==
Chewink was decommissioned at Brooklyn, New York 4 February 1947. She was used as a target and sunk off New London, Connecticut, 31 July 1947.
