= USS Cardinal (AM-6) =

Minesweeper of the United States Navy

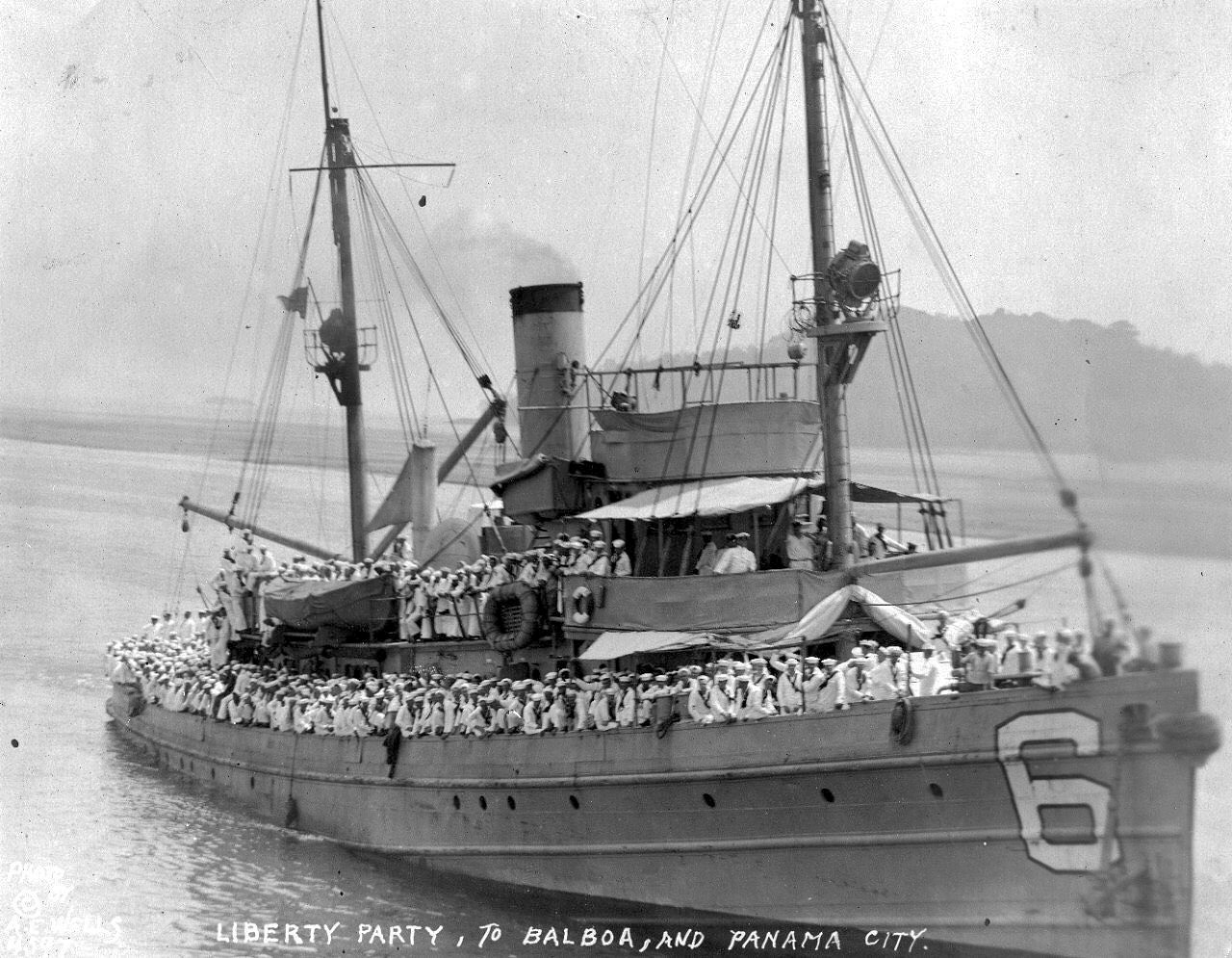
- Cardinal taking a liberty party into Balboa and Panama City, Panama Canal in 1925

History

United States
- Name: USS Cardinal
- Builder: Staten Island Shipbuilding Company., New York
- Launched: 29 March 1918
- Commissioned: 23 August 1918, as Minesweeper No.6
- Reclassified: AM-6, 17 July 1920
- Fate: Grounded on a reef and sank, 6 June 1923

General characteristics
- Class & type: Lapwing-class minesweeper
- Displacement: 950 long tons (970 t) full
- Length: 187 ft 10 in (57.25 m)
- Beam: 35 ft 6 in (10.82 m)
- Draft: 9 ft 9 in (2.97 m)
- Speed: 14 kn (16 mph; 26 km/h)
- Complement: 78
- Armament: 2 × 3 in (76 mm) guns

USS Cardinal (AM-6) was a Lapwing-class minesweeper in the United States Navy. She was named after the cardinal bird.

Cardinal was launched 29 March 1918 by Staten Island Shipbuilding Co., New York; sponsored by Ms. I. Nelson; and commissioned on 23 August 1918 as Minesweeper No.6.

== History ==
=== East Coast operations ===
Cardinal served in the 3rd Naval District, sweeping waters off New York and serving as a temporary lightship, until 3 August 1919, when she sailed to join the Pacific Fleet.

=== Pacific Ocean deployment ===
For the next three years, she sailed out of San Diego and San Diego, California, carrying supplies, provisions and passengers along the California coast, and towing lighters, targets, and disabled ships. Cardinal was redesignated as AM-6 on 17 July 1920.

From 8 February – 16 April 1923, Cardinal sailed to the Panama Canal to provide tug services during fleet battle practice. She returned to San Pedro to prepare for duty in Alaskan waters, and on 23 May sailed for Port Angeles, Washington, where she called from 30 May – 1 June.

=== Fate ===
While bound for Dutch Harbor on 6 June, she was grounded on a reef off the east coast of Chirikof Island, and heavy flooding began immediately. Some of her men were landed on the island, where they were later taken off by a United States Coast and Geodetic Survey ship. The rest were rescued from the battered Cardinal on 7 June by the oiler Cuyama, who also took off salvageable material and stores. The remaining hulk sank soon thereafter.
