= USS Lapwing (AM-1) =

Minesweeper of the United States Navy

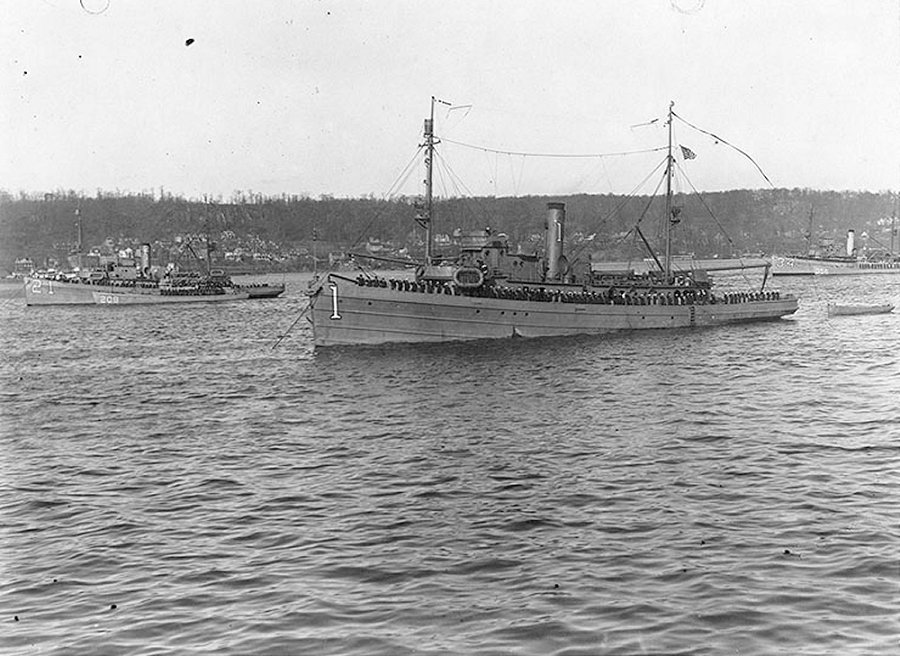
- Lapwing in review of the Atlantic Fleet Minesweeping Squadron, November 1919. Ships of the squadron anchored in the Hudson River, off New York City, while being reviewed by Secretary of the Navy Josephus Daniels on 24 November 1919, following their return to the United States after taking part in clearing the North Sea Mine Barrage.

History

United States
- Name: USS Lapwing
- Namesake: Lapwing
- Builder: Todd Shipyard Co., New York
- Laid down: 25 October 1917
- Launched: 14 March 1918
- Commissioned: 12 June 1918
- Decommissioned: 11 April 1922
- Recommissioned: 1 September 1932
- Decommissioned: 29 November 1945
- Reclassified: AVP-1, 22 January 1936
- Fate: Sold by WSA, 19 August 1946

General characteristics
- Class & type: Lapwing-class minesweeper
- Displacement: 950 long tons (965 t)
- Length: 187 ft 10 in (57.25 m)
- Beam: 35 ft 6 in (10.82 m)
- Draft: 9 ft 10 in (3.00 m)
- Speed: 14 knots (26 km/h; 16 mph)
- Complement: 78
- Armament: 2 × 3 in (76 mm) guns

USS Lapwing (AM-1/AVP-1) was the lead ship of her class of minesweeper – the first minesweeper of the United States Navy. She was named after a bird, the lapwing, an abundant crested plover (Vanellus vanellus) of Europe, Asia, and northern Africa, noted for its slow, irregular, flapping flight and its shrill wailing cry.

Lapwing was laid down 25 October 1917 by Todd Shipyard Co., New York; launched 14 March 1918; sponsored by Miss Agnes Forshew Schlegel; and commissioned 12 June 1918.

== World War I minesweeping operations ==
Following several convoy escort cruises to Halifax, Lapwing departed New London, Connecticut, 26 September 1918 for Europe. Assigned to the North Sea mine barrage, the minesweeper removed 2,160 mines from British waters between June and September 1919.

Upon her return to the United States, she was dispatched to the West Coast, arriving San Diego on 21 October 1920. Sailing for Pearl Harbor in January 1921, Lapwing engaged in minesweeping operations in Hawaiian waters until she decommissioned 11 April 1922.

== Second commissioning ==
Lapwing recommissioned at Pearl Harbor 1 September 1932. She arrived Coco Solo, Canal Zone, 29 October for operations with the aircraft scouting force. From 1933 to 1941, Lapwing participated in various exercises with aircraft, helping develop American naval aviation capability for its decisive role in future wars. Reclassified as a Small Seaplane Tender, AVP-1, on 22 January 1936, she operated primarily with seaplanes in the Panama Canal Zone, along the West Coast, and in the Caribbean.

== World War II operations ==
Based at Trinidad, British West Indies, upon the outbreak of World War II, Lapwing was assigned to the North Atlantic. Departing the Caribbean 26 February 1942, she arrived Narsarssuak, Greenland, 12 May. Operating with Patrol Wing 3, Lapwing remained in the frigid North Atlantic, engaging in patrol and ASW missions with seaplanes.

After another brief tour in the Caribbean, the seaplane tender arrived Key West 13 June 1943 for duty as a training ship. Operating out of the Fleet Sound School for 11 months, Lapwing aided in the perfection of air ASW technology. After a cruise to Recife, Brazil (May–August 1944), as a task force support unit, the seaplane tender returned Key West on 4 September and operated there for the rest of the war.

== Decommissioning ==
Arriving Charleston, South Carolina, 5 October 1945, Lapwing decommissioned there 29 November 1945. She was sold by WSA on 19 August 1946 to W. S. Sanders, Norfolk, Virginia.
