= USS Finch (AM-9) =

United States minesweeper

Coordinates: 14°22′N 120°35′E

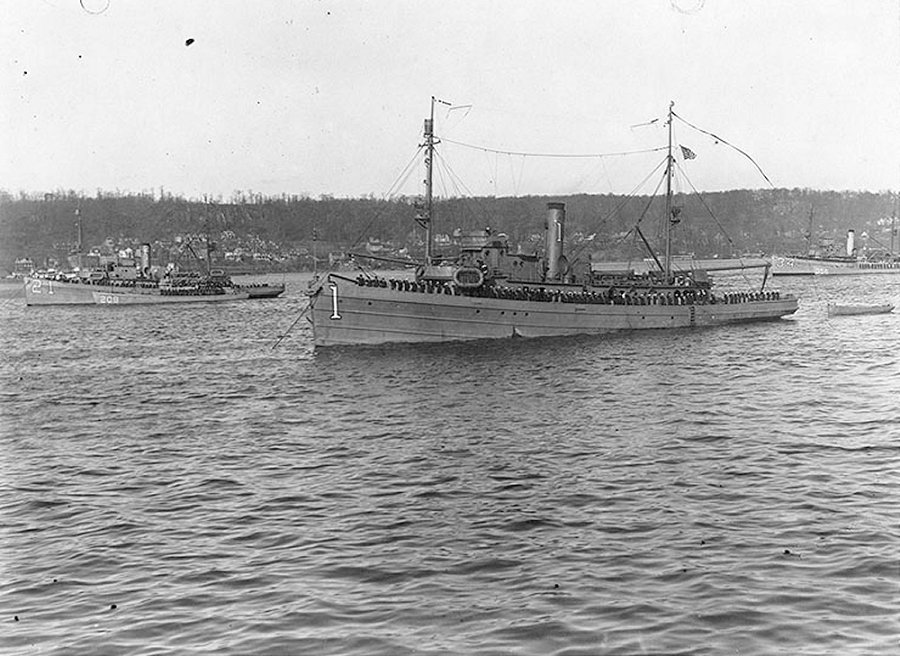

History

United States
- Name: USS Finch
- Builder: Standard Shipbuilding Co., New York
- Launched: 30 March 1918
- Commissioned: 10 September 1918; (as Minesweeper No.9)
- Reclassified: AM-9, 17 July 1920
- Stricken: 8 May 1942
- Honours and awards: 1 battle star (World War II)
- Fate: damaged by Japanese bomb, 10 April 1942
- Notes: salvaged by Japanese

Japan
- Name: Patrol Boat No. 103 (Dai-103-Gō shōkaitei)
- Acquired: 8 May 1942
- Commissioned: 1 April 1943
- Fate: Sunk by United States bombs, 12 January 1945

General characteristics
- Class & type: Lapwing-class minesweeper
- Displacement: 950 long tons (965 t)
- Length: 187 ft 10 in (57.25 m)
- Beam: 35 ft 6 in (10.82 m)
- Draft: 10 ft 4 in (3.15 m)
- Speed: 14 knots (26 km/h; 16 mph)
- Complement: 78
- Armament: 2 × 3 in (76 mm) guns

USS Finch (AM-9) was a Lapwing-class minesweeper acquired by the U.S. Navy for the dangerous task of removing mines from minefields laid in the water to prevent ships from passing. During World War II, Finch was sunk and later salvaged by the Japanese and commissioned as Patrol Boat No. 103.

Finch was named for the finch, and is strictly speaking the only U.S. vessel named for such.

== Service history ==
Finch was launched 30 March 1918 by Standard Shipbuilding Co., New York; sponsored by Mrs. F. G. Peabody; and commissioned 10 September 1918.

=== North Atlantic operations ===
After training and operations with a submarine bell, Finch sailed from New York 9 August 1919 for Kirkwall, Orkney Islands, Scotland. Here she based for two months of duty removing the vast number of mines laid in the North Sea during World War I. Finch returned to Charleston on 29 November 1920, and on 3 January 1920 sailed for San Pedro, Los Angeles, where from 1 March to 29 August she was in reduced commission.

=== Pacific Ocean operations ===
Modernized, she sailed from San Francisco on 20 August 1921 for duty with the Asiatic Fleet, and for the next 20 years, served in the Philippines in the winter and out of the China base at Chefoo in the summer. Her duties were varied, and included towing and salvage work, as well as participation in the Yangtze River Patrol. She joined in fleet exercises, and as war tension heightened, played a part in protecting American citizens and interests in the Far East.

In 1937, Finch was commanded briefly by LCDR (later VADM, permanent rank) Hyman G. Rickover, future commander of Naval Reactors and the longest-serving active duty U.S. Naval officer. Rickover commanded Finch from 17 July to 5 October 1937 and it was the only command at sea Rickover ever held. The ship was primarily operating at Shanghai, China, to protect American interests during the Battle of Shanghai.

=== World War II operations ===
In 1941, she began work in intensive development exercises with submarine and mine groups in the Philippines, and as war came closer, spent December on patrol in the Taiwan Straits. According to an account given by Yeoman 3C A. Glenn Pratt, a crewmember aboard the Finch, she was assigned, along with the Heron, a sister vessel with a diving bell, to escort two US Navy river gunboats back to Manila Harbor from their station in China since the Japanese had sunk one such vessel, the Panay, in 1937. During the return leg of this mission, the vessels were temporarily surrounded by Japanese naval vessels headed toward the Philippines. The gunboats scouted the Japanese column, then pulled ahead to report the naval activity to Washington, while the Finch and Heron stayed behind, eventually being left by the Japanese as well. The two vessels returned to Manila Bay on 6 December 1941.

As the Japanese began aerial bombardment of bases in the Philippines, the Finch continued her task of sweeping for mines to keep the channel into the harbor open for incoming shipping. Yeoman Pratt reported that machine gunners on board the Finch downed one Japanese aircraft during an air raid, and though the Captain congratulated them, he asked them not to repeat the feat so that they would not become a special target and be able to continue mine sweeping operations. After running out of fuel in March, Finch was anchored in shallow water and her crew taken to shore defense positions.

==== Sunk by a Japanese bomb ====
On 9 April 1942, while moored at the eastern point of Corregidor, Finch was damaged by the near miss of a Japanese bomb, her seams opening and fragments of the bomb piercing her hull. The entire crew landed safely, and Finch was abandoned to sink the next day, 10 April 1942.

Many of the Finch's crew served during the siege of Corregidor, though her captain was evacuated to Australia via submarine. The survivors of Corregidor were the first prisoners to arrive at Cabanatuan prison camp where they endured harsh conditions as described by Finch survivor Vernon G. LaHeist in his memoir. Many were later removed to camps in Japan, Taiwan, or China. Yeoman Pratt, held in three camps in Taiwan, was evacuated aboard the destroyer escort USS Finch, and was startled at seeing the name, thinking it had been named for his old vessel, but that ship was named in honor of Lt.(j.g.) Joseph W. Finch, who died aboard the USS Laffey during the battle of Guadalcanal.

==== Service with the Japanese Navy ====
According to Japanese records the Finch was salvaged and designated Patrol Boat No. 103 in April 1943. The PB-103 served as a convoy escort in the Philippines and Indochina. On 12 January 1945, off Cape Padaran in the South China Sea (11°10'N, 108°55'E), Finch was attacked and sunk by aircraft from the USS Lexington (CV-16), USS Hancock (CV-19) and USS Hornet (CV-12) which were part of Vice Admiral John S. McCain, Sr.'s Task Force 38 that had entered the South China Sea to raid Japanese shipping.

== Awards ==
- World War II Victory Medal with "Minesweeper" clasp
- Yangtze Service Medal
- China Service Medal
- American Defense Service Medal with "FLEET" clasp
- Asiatic–Pacific Campaign Medal with one battle star
- World War Two Victory Medal
- Philippine Presidential Unit Citation
- Philippine Defense Medal with one star
