= USS Heron (AM-10) =

Minesweeper of the United States Navy

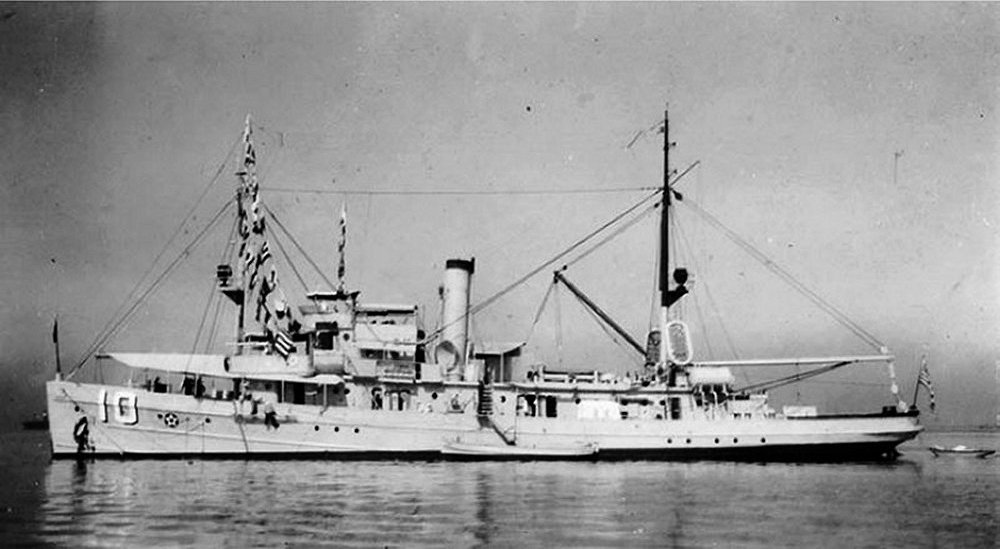

History

United States
- Name: USS Heron
- Builder: Standard Shipbuilding Co., New York
- Launched: 18 May 1918, as Minesweeper No.10
- Commissioned: 30 October 1918
- Decommissioned: 6 April 1922
- Recommissioned: 18 December 1924 as AVP-2
- Decommissioned: 12 February 1946
- Reclassified: AM-10, 17 February 1920; AVP-2, 22 January 1936
- Honours and awards: 4 battle stars and the Navy Unit Commendation (World War II)
- Fate: Transferred to the State Department (Foreign Liquidation Commission) in July 1947 for disposal.

General characteristics
- Class & type: Lapwing-class minesweeper
- Displacement: 840 long tons (853 t)
- Length: 187 ft 10 in (57.25 m)
- Beam: 35 ft 6 in (10.82 m)
- Draft: 9 ft 9 in (2.97 m)
- Speed: 14 knots (26 km/h; 16 mph)
- Complement: 78
- Armament: 2 × 3 in (76 mm) guns

USS Heron (AM-10) was a Lapwing-class minesweeper acquired by the United States Navy for the dangerous task of removing mines from minefields laid in the water to prevent ships from passing.

Heron was named by the U.S Navy after the heron, a long-necked, long-legged wading bird indigenous to Louisiana and the vast coastal marshes.

Heron was launched 18 May 1918 by the Standard Shipbuilding Co.; sponsored by Miss Astrid Rundquist, daughter of the minesweeper's prospective commanding officer; and commissioned 30 October 1918.

== 1918–41 ==
Departing Boston 17 November 1918, Heron performed experimental mine sweeping work until 8 March 1919, when she returned to Boston to be fitted out for foreign duty. She departed Provincetown, Massachusetts and sailed for Kirkwall, Orkney Islands to participate in mine sweeping in the North Sea. She remained in the area for seven months helping to remove the countless mines laid there during World War I.

Returning to Hampton Roads 1 November, she proceeded to New York and then to the U.S. West Coast. Heron reached San Diego 27 January 1920 to report for duty with the Pacific Minesweeper Division. She sailed for Pearl Harbor to join the Asiatic Fleet. In early October Heron sailed for the Philippines with Avocet and Finch.

The minesweeper served in the 4th Division mine detachment until she decommissioned at Cavite on 6 April 1922.

Heron recommissioned 18 December 1924 and reported to the Aircraft Squadron, Asiatic Fleet for duty as a seaplane tender. She operated principally in Chinese and Philippine waters, performing such diverse tasks as patrol, survey, target-towing, and plane-tending in addition to tactical maneuvers. Heron was reclassified AVP-2 on 22 January 1936 and continued to play an important role in protecting American citizens and interests in the Far East.

== World War II ==
When the Japanese attack on Pearl Harbor thrust America into war on 7 December 1941, Heron (Lt. William L. Kabler) was stationed in Port Ciego, Philippines. After supporting General MacArthur's defense of the Philippines, Heron retired to the Moluccas and set up a base at Ambon. Upon hearing that Peary (DD-226) had been bombed and was in need of help, she got underway 29 December with oil and spare parts intending to rendezvous with the stricken destroyer at Ternate. Next morning, upon learning that Peary had left, she headed back to Ambon.

=== Attacks by Japanese aircraft, 31 December 1941 ===
The following morning, 31 December, an enemy aircraft came in on a bombing run. Heron opened fire with every gun on the ship, and apparently enough machine gun fire hit the plane to discourage a bomb drop on the first run. The bomber came in twice more to aim bombs at the twisting and turning seaplane tender, but the agile ship always managed to dodge in time.

Heron then made a run for a rain squall to the southwest. Some two hours later the weather cleared, and a Japanese flying boat was sighted on the water on Heron's starboard beam. The aircraft took off and circled Heron for almost four hours. About 1430 two sections of three four-engine Japanese patrol planes were sighted.

Half an hour later, one of the sections broke off and came in on a horizontal bombing attack. Although this section made three bombing attacks, in each case the ship was maneuvered to avoid the bombs. The second section came in next on a bombing attack, and, on their first run, Heron drew first blood by hitting one of the planes with a 3-inch shell. The plane started smoking, dropped out of formation, and retired to the north. Heron was again able to outmaneuver the bombs unleashed by the two remaining planes on a final pass.

About this time five twin-engine land-based bombers and three additional four-engine patrol bombers were sighted. The five bombers made a pass over the ship, but did not release any bombs until they had circled again. On the rerun they dropped a stick of bombs. One hit directly on the top of the mainmast, and three others hit just off the port bow. Pieces of shrapnel cut all the mainmast stays to the boat booms, injuring most of the gun crew there. The near misses off the port bow set the paint locker in the forward storeroom on fire, damaged the port 3-inch gun, killed one of the lookouts, and injured all the gun crew on the port 3-inch gun and the gun crews on the port machine guns.

Next, three four-engine patrol planes made torpedo attacks: one plane on the starboard bow; one on the port bow; and the other on the port quarter. Heron maneuvered skillfully, and all three torpedoes missed.

They then strafed the ship, doing considerable damage. However, the crew of single 3-inch (76 mm) gun shot down one of the planes as it came in to attack. Heron had approximately 26 casualties, or about 50 percent of the crew, as a result of the attack.

During that night the fires were extinguished; the forward hold was pumped out to bring the ship back to an even keel; and the 3-inch gun was repaired. When the ship arrived back at Ambon, she resumed tending seaplanes and continued this duty until early 1942. For her "valiant action" during this period, Heron received the Navy Unit Commendation.

=== 1942–46 ===
Following the fall of the Dutch East Indies to the Japanese, Heron was based in Australia as a seaplane tender.

She remained in and around Australia through early 1944 as an advance base tender. Heron also conducted salvage operations and served as an aviation gasoline and fuel oil transport. Departing Australia on 22 March 1944, she next participated in the landings in the Admiralty Islands during April and then continued her plane tending duties. Steaming to the Solomons 1 September, Heron served as tender for Patrol Squadron 101, which was engaged in search and rescue work as the Pacific Ocean campaign moved into high gear.

When the U.S. Navy brought MacArthur back to the Philippines in the momentous Leyte campaign, Heron was there, reaching San Pedro Bay on 21 November. In the thick of almost continuous enemy air attacks, Heron spent over a month in the Philippines tending seaplanes before returning to New Guinea for repairs.

Heron again returned to the Philippines in April 1945 to participate in the wrap-up of the war in that quarter, and remained there through the end of World War II.

She decommissioned at Subic Bay, Philippines on 12 February 1946 and was transferred to the State Department (Foreign Liquidation Commission) in July 1947 for disposal.

== Awards ==
- Navy Unit Commendation
- Victory Medal
- Yangtze Service Medal
- China Service Medal
- American Defense Service Medal with "Fleet" clasp
- Asiatic-Pacific Campaign Medal with four battle stars
- World War II Victory Medal
- Philippine Defense Medal with star
- Philippine Liberation Medal with two stars
- Philippine Independence Medal
