= USS Warbler (AM-53) =

Minesweeper of the United States Navy

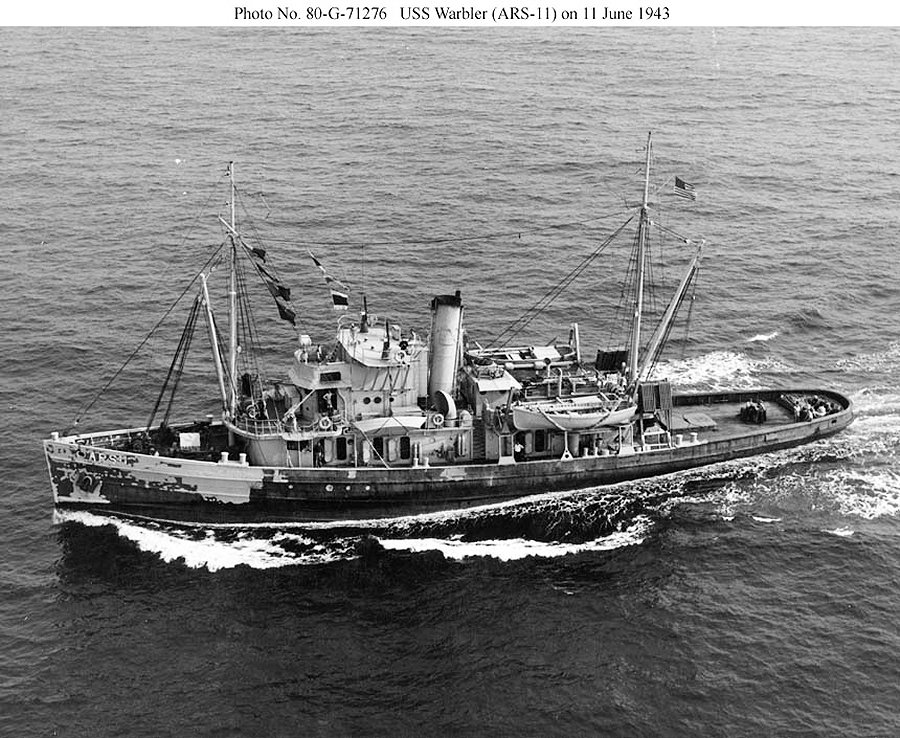
- USS Warbler (ARS-11)

History

United States
- Name: USS Warbler
- Builder: Philadelphia Navy Yard
- Laid down: 24 April 1919
- Launched: 30 July 1919
- Commissioned: 22 December 1919, as Minesweeper No.53
- Decommissioned: 29 March 1946
- Reclassified: AM-53, 17 July 1920; ARS-11, 13 September 1941
- Stricken: 10 June 1947
- Fate: Declared surplus, 13 January 1947

General characteristics
- Class & type: Lapwing-class minesweeper
- Displacement: 950 long tons (965 t)
- Length: 187 ft 10 in (57.25 m)
- Beam: 35 ft 6 in (10.82 m)
- Draft: 9 ft 9 in (2.97 m)
- Propulsion: Triple expansion reciprocating steam engine; 2 Babcock & Wilcox boilers; 1 shaft
- Speed: 14 knots (26 km/h; 16 mph)
- Complement: 85
- Armament: None

USS Warbler (AM-53) (Minesweeper No. 53) was a Lapwing-class minesweeper laid down on 24 April 1919 by the Philadelphia Navy Yard; launched on 30 July 1919; sponsored by Miss Alice Kempff, the daughter of Capt. C. S. Kempff, the Captain of the Yard; and commissioned on 22 December 1919.

After brief service with the Train of the Atlantic Fleet, Warbler was decommissioned on 16 June 1920 and simultaneously transferred, on loan, to the United States Shipping Board. The ship operated with a civilian crew under the aegis of Merritt, Chapman, and Scott, a New York-based salvage firm. On 13 September 1941, the Navy reclassified Warbler a salvage vessel and designated her ARS-11

== World War II operations ==
During World War II, she continued to operate with a civilian crew under a contract with the Naval Salvage Service. She was based at the Merritt, Chapman, and Scott salvage depot at Key West, Florida, and worked primarily in the Gulf of Mexico and the Caribbean, towing disabled ships; assisting stranded or grounded vessels; escorting coastwise convoys; and conducting salvage operations.

== End-of-War deactivation ==
After the war ended, the U.S. Navy designated Warbler for disposal on 29 March 1946 and declared her surplus on 13 January 1947. She was struck from the Navy list on 10 June 1947.
