= USS Woodcock =

Minesweeper of the United States Navy

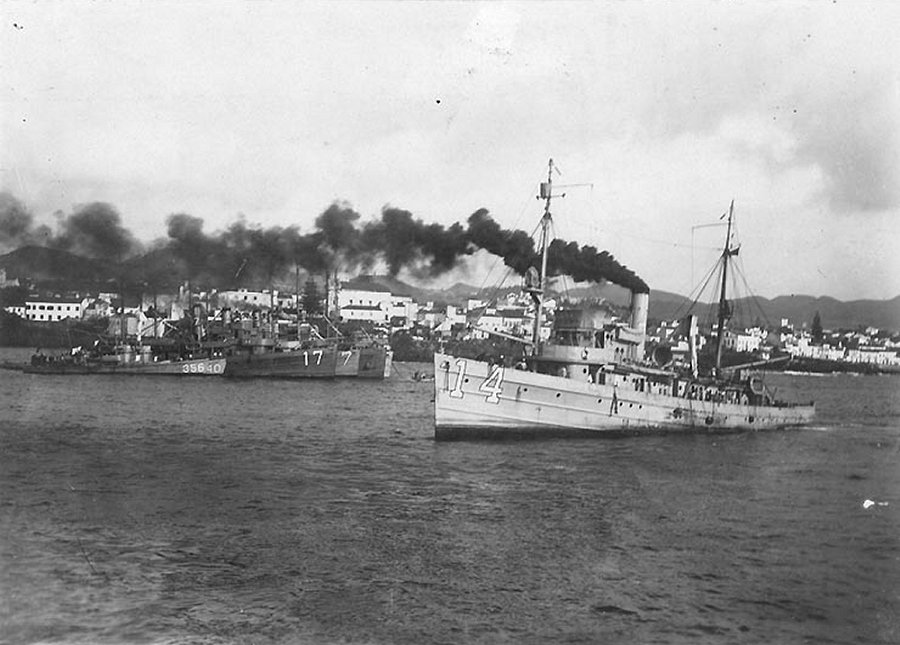

History

United States
- Name: USS Woodcock
- Builder: Merchant Shipbuilding Corporation, Chester, Pennsylvania
- Laid down: 19 October 1917
- Launched: 12 May 1918
- Commissioned: 19 February 1919, as Minesweeper No. 14
- Decommissioned: 30 September 1946
- Reclassified: AM-14, 17 July 1920; AT-145, 1 June 1942; ATO-145, 15 May 1944
- Stricken: 23 April 1947
- Fate: Sold for scrap, 19 December 1947

General characteristics
- Class & type: Lapwing-class minesweeper
- Displacement: 950 long tons (965 t)
- Length: 187 ft 10 in (57.25 m)
- Beam: 35 ft 6 in (10.82 m)
- Draft: 9 ft 10 in (3.00 m)
- Speed: 14 knots (26 km/h; 16 mph)
- Complement: 85
- Armament: 2 × 3 in (76 mm) guns

USS Woodcock (AM-14) was an Lapwing-class minesweeper acquired by the United States Navy for the dangerous task of removing mines from minefields laid in the water to prevent ships from passing.

Woodcock was named, by the U.S. Navy, for the woodcock, a game bird that frequents wooded areas.

Woodcock (Minesweeper No. 14) was laid down on 19 October 1917 at Chester, Pennsylvania, by the Chester Shipbuilding Co.; launched on 12 May 1918; sponsored by Mrs. Lewis T. Kniskern; and commissioned at the Philadelphia Navy Yard on 19 February 1919.

== World War I Atlantic operations ==
After performing experimental minesweeping work at Newport, Rhode Island, and tending lightships at New York, Woodcock sailed for the Orkney Islands and reached Kirkwall, Scotland, on 10 July 1919. Over the ensuing months, the ship operated in the North Sea on mine-sweeping duties with the Atlantic Fleet's minesweeping detachment. During that time, Woodcock spent 54 days in the minefields and 28 in port for needed upkeep and voyage repairs occasioned by the heavy weather often encountered by the ships of the detachment.

== Post-war inactivity ==
Upon conclusion of the sweeping operations, the ship returned to the U.S. East Coast and operated with Mine Squadron 1, Mine Division 5, Atlantic Fleet, until she was decommissioned at the Portsmouth Navy Yard in Kittery, Maine, on 5 May 1922. Meanwhile, she had been classified as AM-14 on 17 July 1920.

== Recalled from reserve status ==
Woodcock remained in reserve at Portsmouth until recommissioned there on 21 February 1924. She then became station ship at Port-au-Prince, Haiti, to support U.S. Marine Corps peace-keeping forces there. As such, Woodcock was one of the three Lapwing-class minesweepers re-commissioned for service as gunboats . Her sister-ships, Penguin (AM-33) and Pigeon (AM-47), were sent to the Asiatic Fleet for duty with the Yangtze Patrol.

Outside yearly return voyages to a navy yard in the United States such as that of Charleston, South Carolina, for repairs and alterations, Woodcock remained in Haitian waters, based on Port-au-Prince, through the spring of 1934. That summer, when President Franklin D. Roosevelt decided to pull the U.S. Marine Corps occupation force – a veritable fixture in Haitian history since August 1916 – out of Haiti, Woodcock took part in that important troop lift. On 15 August 1934, amidst impressive shoreside ceremonies and "most friendly feelings displayed by the populace," Woodcock — in company with Bridge (AF-1), Argonne (AS-10), and U.S. Army transport Chateau Thierry — embarked 79 officers and 747 enlisted men of the 1st Marine Brigade, the last of the occupation troops, and took them back to the United States.

Soon thereafter, the minesweeper — or quasi-gunboat – shifted to Guantanamo Bay, Cuba. She served as a district craft – occasionally exercising with the fleet during its winter maneuvers and participating in some of the Fleet's amphibious exercises under the aegis of the Commandant, 15th Naval District, through the outbreak of war in Europe in the autumn of 1939.

== World War II operations ==
During World War II, Woodcock operated under the auspices of the Panama Sea Frontier Command, working between the Panama Canal Zone and New Orleans, Louisiana. While performing towing, salvage, and local escort duties, she assisted vessels in distress and stood by to protect them until help arrived. During her service in Gulf of Mexico waters, the ship was twice reclassified – first becoming an ocean-going tug, AT-145, on 1 June 1942; then an ocean-going tug (old), ATO-145, on 15 May 1944.

== Post-World War II assignments ==
Following the war, Woodcock continued local operations out of Cristobal, Panama and called at the Galapagos Islands in the spring of 1946. Retained until the arrival of Recovery (ARS-43), Woodcock performed her final towing service that summer. She took Floating Workshop YR-64 from Cristobal to New York, reaching the latter port on 27 August 1946. After getting underway the following day, Woodcock headed south; arrived at Charleston on 31 August; and reported to Commandant, 6th Naval District, for disposition.

== Decommissioning ==
Decommissioned at Charleston on 30 September 1946, Woodcock was struck from the Navy List on 23 April 1947 and transferred to the Maritime Commission on 4 August of the same year. She was sold to the Potomac Shipwrecking Co., Inc., of Pope's Creek, Maryland, on 19 December 1947.
