= USS Tern (AM-31) =

Minesweeper of the United States Navy

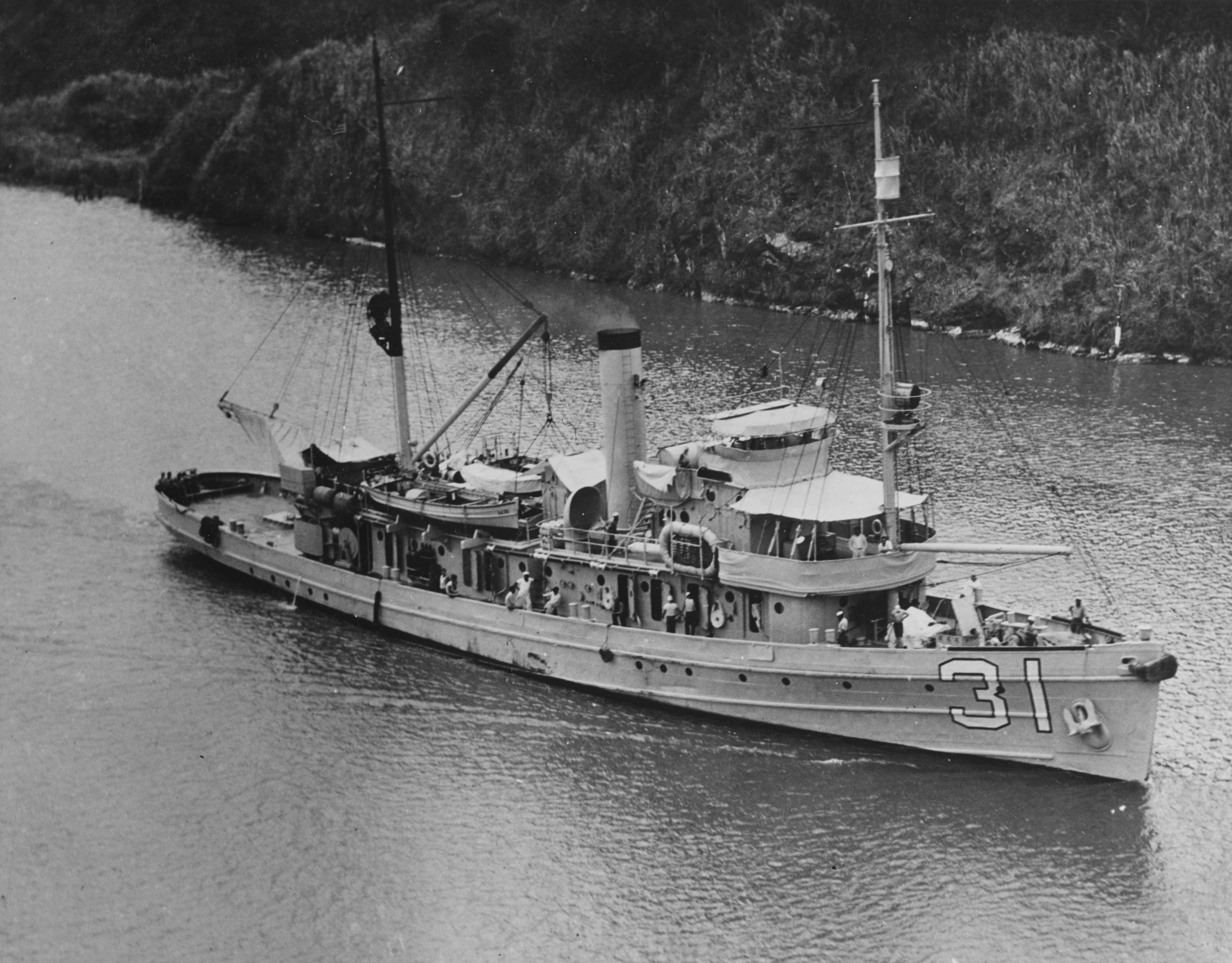

History

United States
- Name: USS Tern
- Builder: Gas Engine & Power Co. and the C. L. Seabury Co., Morris Heights, New York
- Laid down: 7 September 1918
- Launched: 22 March 1919
- Commissioned: 17 May 1919, as Minesweeper No.31
- Decommissioned: 23 November 1945
- Reclassified: AM-31, 17 July 1920; AT-142, 1 June 1942; ATO-142, 15 May 1944
- Stricken: 5 December 1945
- Honours and awards: 1 battle star (World War II)
- Fate: Most likely scrapped

General characteristics
- Class & type: Lapwing-class minesweeper
- Displacement: 950 long tons (965 t)
- Length: 187 ft 10 in (57.25 m)
- Beam: 35 ft 6 in (10.82 m)
- Draft: 9 ft 9 in (2.97 m)
- Speed: 14 knots (26 km/h; 16 mph)
- Complement: 100
- Armament: 1 × 1-pounder gun; 2 × Lewis machine guns

The second USS Tern (AM-31) was an Lapwing-class minesweeper acquired by the U.S. Navy for the dangerous task of removing mines from minefields laid in the water to prevent ships from passing.

Tern was laid down on 7 September 1918 at Morris Heights, New York, by the Gas Engine & Power Co. and the C. L. Seabury Co.; launched on 22 March 1919; sponsored by Mrs. Bruce Scrimgeour; and commissioned on 17 May 1919 as Minesweeper No. 31.

== West Coast operations ==
Tern was assigned to the United States Pacific Fleet and steamed to the west coast. On 1 October, the minesweeper joined Train Squadron (TrainRon) 2, Fleet Base Force, at Pearl Harbor. Her squadron operated in support of the Battle Force for the next nine years. Tern was designated AM-31 on 17 July 1920 when the Navy first assigned hull numbers to its ships. In July 1927, Tern and her squadron moved to San Diego, California, and operated out of that port for six years before their base was shifted to San Pedro, California. Tern remained with TrainRon 2, Base Force, and accompanied it to Pearl Harbor on 19 June 1941 when the squadron was again assigned to Hawaii.

== Japanese attack on Pearl Harbor ==
When the Japanese attacked Pearl Harbor on 7 December 1941, Tern was alongside Argonne in the first repair slip at the north end of 1010 Dock, upkeep undergoing. All of her machinery was dead, and she was receiving steam and electricity from the dock. She was notified of the attack at 0753 and immediately made preparations to get underway. Twelve minutes later, her gunners opened fire with Lewis machine guns on an incoming enemy plane which was seen to crash near the Officers' Club. At 0943, the minesweeper moved out into the harbor and picked up 47 survivors from various ships. Tern then proceeded to Arizona to assist in fighting fires but was soon ordered to aid West Virginia. The fires on West Virginia were extinguished at 1430 on 8 December, and the minesweeper moved back alongside Arizona until the fires on that battleship were brought under control, shortly after noon on the 9th. Tern was not damaged by the Japanese attack.

== World War II Pacific Theatre operations ==
On 9 January 1942, Tern began towing a fuel oil barge to Johnston Island. She delivered it on the 13th and returned to Pearl Harbor. Tern got underway for the Society Islands on 9 February, arrived at Borabora on the 18th, and was assigned duty there as station ship. On 1 March, the Base Force was renamed Service Force, Pacific; and, on 1 June, the minesweeper was redesignated AT-142, an ocean tug. She remained at Borabora until 2 January 1943 when she was relieved by Advent (AM-83). The tug returned to Pearl Harbor on 27 January and, five weeks later, headed for San Pedro, California, and an overhaul.

Tern arrived back at Pearl Harbor on 23 May and joined the Service Squadron, U.S. 3rd Fleet, operating in the Hawaiian area. Her duties for the next year consisted of recovering training torpedoes, towing targets for bombing and gunnery practice, and assisting other ships. On 15 May 1944, her designation was changed to ATO-142 (Ocean Tug, Old).

== Supporting the liberation of the Philippines ==
On 9 July, Tern joined a convoy headed for the Marshall Islands. She arrived at Eniwetok on the 28th and operated from that base for the next five months towing craft to Majuro, Tarawa, Ulithi, and Guam. On 4 January 1945, the tug shifted her base of operations to Ulithi for five months. On 26 May, Tern got underway for Leyte, Philippine Islands. She arrived at San Pedro on 1 June and was assigned duty as a target towing ship with Submarine Training, Pacific Fleet, at Guam. The tug arrived at Apra Harbor, Guam, on 20 June and operated with submarines until 1 September when she was relieved by Cormorant (ATO-133). The next week, Tern began the long voyage, via Eniwetok and Pearl Harbor, to the United States.

== Post-war deactivation ==
Tern arrived at San Francisco, California, in mid-October and began preparing for inactivation. She was decommissioned on 23 November and struck from the Naval Vessel Register on 5 December 1945.

== Awards ==
Tern received one battle star for World War II.
