= USS Redwing (AM-48) =

Minesweeper of the United States Navy

Coordinates: 37°19′N 9°56′E

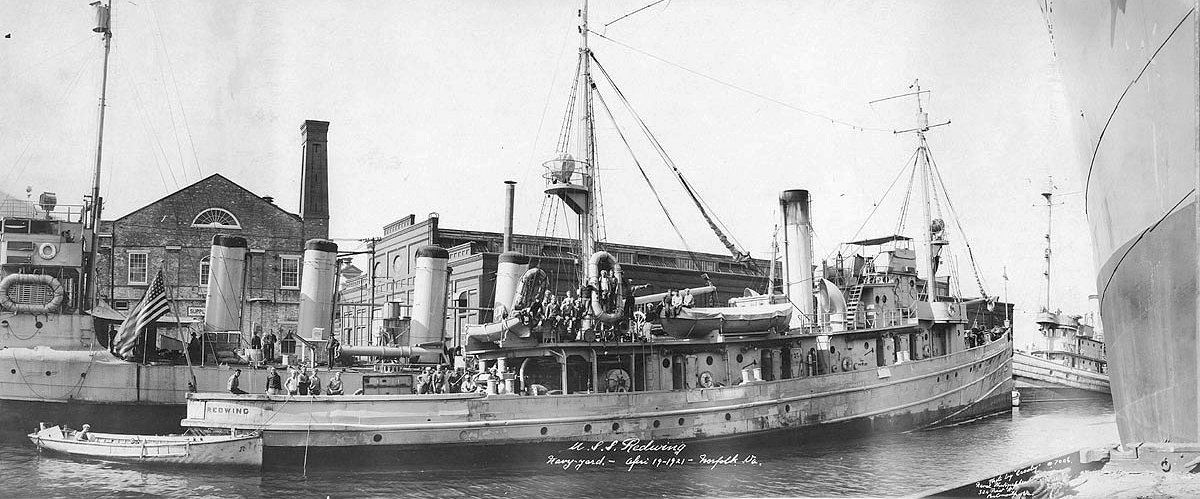

History

United States
- Builder: Baltimore Drydock & Shipbuilding Co., Baltimore, Maryland
- Laid down: 5 August 1918
- Launched: 7 June 1919
- Commissioned: 17 October 1919, as Minesweeper No.48
- Reclassified: AM-48, 17 July 1920; USCGC Redwing, 24 May 1924; ARS-4, 29 August 1941
- Stricken: 19 August 1943
- Fate: Lost to underwater mine explosion off Bizerte, Tunisia, 29 June 1943

General characteristics
- Class & type: Lapwing-class minesweeper
- Displacement: 950 long tons (965 t)
- Length: 187 ft 10 in (57.25 m)
- Beam: 35 ft 6 in (10.82 m)
- Draft: 9 ft 9 in (2.97 m)
- Propulsion: 1 × 1,400 shp (1,000 kW) Harlan and Hollingsworth vertical triple-expansion steam engine, 1 shaft
- Speed: 14 knots (26 km/h; 16 mph)
- Complement: 72
- Armament: 2 × 3 in (76 mm) guns; 2 × machine guns

USS Redwing (AM-48) was an Lapwing-class minesweeper commissioned by the United States Navy for service in World War I. She was responsible for removing mines from harbors, and, in her role as rescue and salvage ship, she was responsible for coming to the aid of stricken vessels. She was laid down 5 August 1918 by the Baltimore Drydock & Shipbuilding Co., Baltimore, Maryland; launched 7 June 1919; sponsored by Mrs. Fred A. Plagemann, wife of the prospective commanding officer; and commissioned 17 October 1919.

== Post-World War I service ==
She operated out of New York City on various training missions until she decommissioned on 14 April 1922. Placed in service early in 1924, she steamed to Norfolk, Virginia, and was transferred to the U.S. Coast Guard on 24 May. Commissioned on 11 October as USCGC Redwing, a cruising cutter, she operated out of New York City and Boston until 19 November 1928. In January 1929 she assumed permanent duty out of Astoria, Oregon.

Except for various patrol assignments, Redwing remained at Astoria until 1941. Then returning to the east coast, she was transferred back to the U.S. Navy on 29 August, was redesignated ARS-4, and entered Brooklyn Navy Yard for conversion.

Redwing recommissioned 28 October. After shakedown, she was assigned to the Atlantic Fleet on 20 November. Departing New York the same day, she arrived Argentia, Newfoundland, on 23 November; and from there steamed to Iceland, arriving 9 December.

== World War II operations ==
Remaining in Icelandic waters through 9 August 1942, she performed towing and limited salvage services. She arrived New York 30 August and there engaged in salvage operations until October, when she underwent a short availability at Norfolk, Virginia.

Redwing departed 6 November for Casablanca, arriving the 25th after a three-day stopover in Bermuda. She operated under the Casablanca Port Authority as the only salvage ship in the harbor until 5 May 1943. She next reported to Commander, Task Force 84, reached Algiers 19 June, towed a damaged merchant ship into port, and departed 27 June for Bizerte with four YTs in tow.

== Sinking ==
At 0605 29 June, when about 10 nautical miles (19 km) from her destination, Redwing was rocked by an underwater explosion which tore a large hole in her hull just below the bridge. Five officers and eight enlisted men were blown overboard. She began to list dangerously and the order was given to abandon ship. The four tugboats received the crew and recovered two injured officers, two wounded enlisted men, and the body of one other enlisted man.

Her decks awash, Redwing was taken in tow by the tugboats. At 1005 near the main channel leading into the harbor at Bizerte, a British destroyer passed close abeam and her wake caused Redwing to roll over. The towing hawsers were cut and she sank in 160 feet (49 m) of water.

She was struck from the Navy list on 19 August 1943.
