= USS Kingfisher (AM-25) =

Minesweeper of the United States Navy

- USS Kingfisher profile drawing

History

United States
- Name: USS Kingfisher
- Builder: Puget Sound Naval Shipyard, Puget Sound, Washington
- Launched: 30 March 1918
- Commissioned: 27 May 1918, as Minesweeper No.25
- Decommissioned: 6 February 1946
- Reclassified: AM-25, 17 July 1920; AT-135, 1 June 1942; AT(O)-135, 15 May 1944
- Honours and awards: 1 battle star (World War II)
- Fate: Most likely scrapped

General characteristics
- Class & type: Lapwing-class minesweeper
- Displacement: 950 long tons (965 t)
- Length: 187 ft 10 in (57.25 m)
- Beam: 35 ft 6 in (10.82 m)
- Draft: 9 ft 10 in (3.00 m)
- Propulsion: Triple expansion reciprocating steam engine; 2 × Babcock & Wilcox boilers; 1 shaft
- Speed: 14 knots (26 km/h; 16 mph)
- Complement: 78
- Armament: 2 × 3 in (76 mm) guns; 3 × .50 cal (12.7 mm) machine guns

USS Kingfisher (AM-25/AT-135/ATO-135) was an Lapwing-class minesweeper acquired by the United States Navy for the dangerous task of removing mines from minefields laid in the water to prevent ships from passing.

Kingfisher was launched 30 March 1918 by Puget Sound Naval Shipyard, Puget Sound, Washington; sponsored by Miss Nancy Griswold; and commissioned 27 May 1918.

== Post-World War I mine clearance ==
Departing Bremerton, Washington, 17 June, Kingfisher steamed to Philadelphia, Pennsylvania, where she arrived on 8 August for duty as a minesweeper off Cape May, New Jersey. On 5 April 1919 she departed Boston, Massachusetts, for the North Sea, arriving at Inverness, Scotland on 20 April. Assigned to the North Sea Detachment at Kirkwall, Orkney Islands, she swept up mines of the Northern Barrage until 1 October when she sailed for the United States. Steaming via France, Portugal, and the Azores, she reached New York on 19 November.

== Pacific Ocean operations ==
Assigned to the Train Force, Pacific Fleet, Kingfisher departed Hampton Roads, Virginia, 9 August 1920 for the West Coast. Arriving San Diego, California, 3 October, she began duty as a fleet tug and minesweeper. Over the next 19 years fleet maneuvers and supply, towing, and minesweeping operations sent her to the East Coast, Puerto Rico, Cuba, the Panama Canal Zone, and Hawaii. During the summers of 1933, 1934, and 1935 she supplied naval ships and bases in Alaskan waters for the Aleutian Islands Survey Expedition.

Departing San Diego, California, 4 October 1939, she sailed to Pearl Harbor for duty with the Base Force, Hawaiian Detachment. Arriving 19 October, she towed target rafts and conducted gunnery and minesweeping exercises until sailing for Samoa on 26 October 1941. Kingfisher reached Tutuila on 5 November and was on station duty on 7 December when hearing of the Japanese attack on Pearl Harbor.

Kingfisher began defense patrol and mine laying operations off Samoa.

== World War II Pacific operations ==
On 19 February 1942 she departed Tutuila for similar duty in the Fijis and arrived Viti Levu on 23 February. Returning to Samoa on 12 April, she was reclassified AT-135 on 1 June; she then sailed to Wallis Island on 28 July for a month of plane guard and rescue duty. With a lighter in tow she departed Suva, Fiji, 12 September for Nouméa, New Caledonia. Arriving 18 September, she served under the command of the Port Director until she departed for Hawaii on 8 October.

Arriving Pearl Harbor on 30 October, Kingfisher served as a tug and torpedo recovery ship until 23 September when she sailed for the Ellice Islands. She reached Funafuti on 5 October and undertook towing duty between the Ellice and Phoenix Islands. On 8 December she sailed for the Gilbert Islands, arriving Tarawa Atoll on 13 December. Though subjected to intermittent enemy bombing attacks, Kingfisher towed anti-submarine nets and laid telephone cables in Betio Harbor before departing 27 December for Funafuti.

From 30 December to 15 April she continued towing, station ship, and harbor operations in the Ellice, Gilbert, and Marshall Islands; then she departed Kwajalein 16 April for Pearl Harbor, arriving 29 April. Reclassified ATO-135 on 15 May, Kingfisher departed 19 September for further towing operations in the South Pacific. Towing runs sent her to Palmyra, Ellice, Solomon, Admiralty, and Marshall Islands before she returned to Pearl Harbor on 14 November.

== Return to stateside ==
On 18 November she sailed for the West Coast of the United States, arriving San Diego, California, 29 November. She returned to Pearl Harbor on 29 January 1945 and resumed tug and target towing services. On 21 April she assisted in salvage operations of grounded merchantman SS Sarensen. While towing a gunnery target on 4 May, she rescued the pilot of an Army P-47 that had splashed while on a training flight.

== End-of-war decommissioning ==
Kingfisher sailed for San Francisco, California, 30 October, arriving 9 November. Remaining in the San Francisco Bay area, she decommissioned 6 February 1946 and entered the Pacific Reserve Fleet. Transferred to the United States Maritime Commission 3 June 1947, she was sold the same day to M. E. Baker at Suisun Bay, California.

Kingfisher received one battle star for World War II service.
