= USS Cormorant (AM-40) =

Minesweeper of the United States Navy

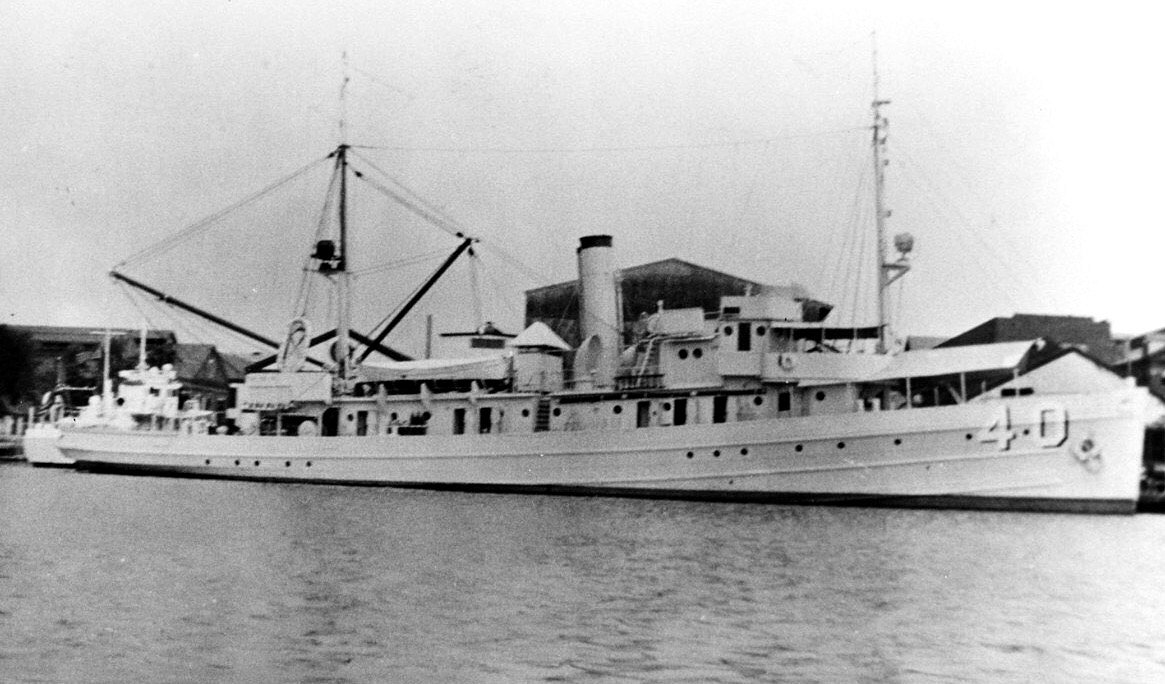

History

United States
- Name: USS Cormorant
- Builder: Todd Shipbuilding Corp., New York City
- Launched: 5 February 1919
- Commissioned: 15 May 1919, as Minesweeper No.40
- Decommissioned: 29 March 1946
- Reclassified: AM-40, 17 July 1920; AT-133, 1 June 1942; ATO-133, 15 May 1944
- Honours and awards: 1 battle star (World War II)
- Fate: Sold, 8 January 1947; likely scrapped

General characteristics
- Class & type: Lapwing-class minesweeper
- Displacement: 950 long tons (965 t)
- Length: 187 ft 10 in (57.25 m)
- Beam: 35 ft 6 in (10.82 m)
- Draft: 9 ft 9 in (2.97 m)
- Speed: 14 knots (26 km/h; 16 mph)
- Complement: 72
- Armament: 2 × 3 in (76 mm) guns

USS Cormorant (AM-40) was an Lapwing-class minesweeper acquired by the United States Navy for the dangerous task of removing mines from minefields laid in the water to prevent ships from passing.

Cormorant was launched 5 February 1919 by Todd Shipbuilding Corp., New York City; sponsored by Miss M. E. Vellaire; and commissioned 15 May 1919.

== North Sea mine clearance ==
Based on Kirkwall in the Orkney Islands, Cormorant joined in the dangerous and exacting task of clearing the North Sea minefields between 22 August 1919 and 1 October. On towing duty, she called at Devonport, Brest, Lisbon, Ponta del Gada, Azores, and Bermuda before returning to Staten Island 19 November 1919 for the Fleet Review in the North River.

== U.S. East Coast operations ==
For the next year and a half, she operated along the east coast and in the Caribbean, joining in maneuvers and military simulations, as she towed targets, acted as tender, and carried mail for the Fleet. Between 23 September 1920 and 27 December 1920, she was in ordinary without a crew at Portsmouth, New Hampshire, for repairs, returning then to full commission.

On 5 February 1921 Cormorant arrived at Washington, D.C., for experimental work under the Bureau of Ordnance. For the next six years she operated almost exclusively in the Potomac River and Chesapeake Bay testing mine weapons and devices, on occasion going to Newport, Rhode Island, on this duty. Early in 1927 she served for a period of two months as station ship in the Virgin Islands, but experimental mine work continued to be her primary duty. In 1928 she again served in the Virgin Islands for two months, and in 1932, was at Guantanamo Bay, Cuba, for a month to tow targets. Several times in 1933 she steamed to Pensacola, Florida, in connection with experimental mineplanting and sweeping. Similar duty continued through 9 December 1942. On 1 June 1942 she was reclassified AT-133.

== World War II Atlantic Theatre operations ==
Between 18 January and 19 May 1943, Cormorant gave tug services at Guantanamo Bay to destroyers in training there, and after calling at Charleston, South Carolina, for repairs in June, sailed north to Reykjavík, Iceland, for salvage duty until 13 October. On 7 December she arrived at Falmouth, England, which was to be her base during the months of training and preparation for "Operation Overlord", the invasion of Normandy. As masses of men and shipping accumulated in English ports, Cormorant gave the essential tug, towing, and salvage services that amphibious operations demand.

== Supporting Operation Overlord ==
Reclassified ATO-133 on 15 May 1944, she put to sea from Portsmouth, England, 7 June 1944 for the newly invaded Normandy coast, and served as towing and salvage ship there, expediting the landing of the great number of men and supplies to support forces ashore, until 23 July. Cormorant towed small craft and barges between Southampton, England, and France until 28 September, then had a brief overhaul at Plymouth, England, returning to Falmouth, England, for salvage and towing duty until 12 November.

== Pacific Theatre assignment ==
Cormorant operated between Plymouth, England, and Antwerp on towing duty until 16 January 1945, and returned to New York in convoy 28 February. After overhaul at Norfolk, Virginia, she cleared for the Pacific theater, arriving at San Pedro, California, 24 June. On towing duty, she proceeded to Guam where she served as torpedo recovery ship between 6 September and 12 December.

== Post-War decommissioning ==
Returning to San Pedro, California, 24 January, Cormorant was decommissioned 29 March 1946, and sold on 8 January 1947.

== Awards ==
Cormorant received one battle star for World War II service.
