= USS Swan (AM-34) =

Minesweeper of the United States Navy

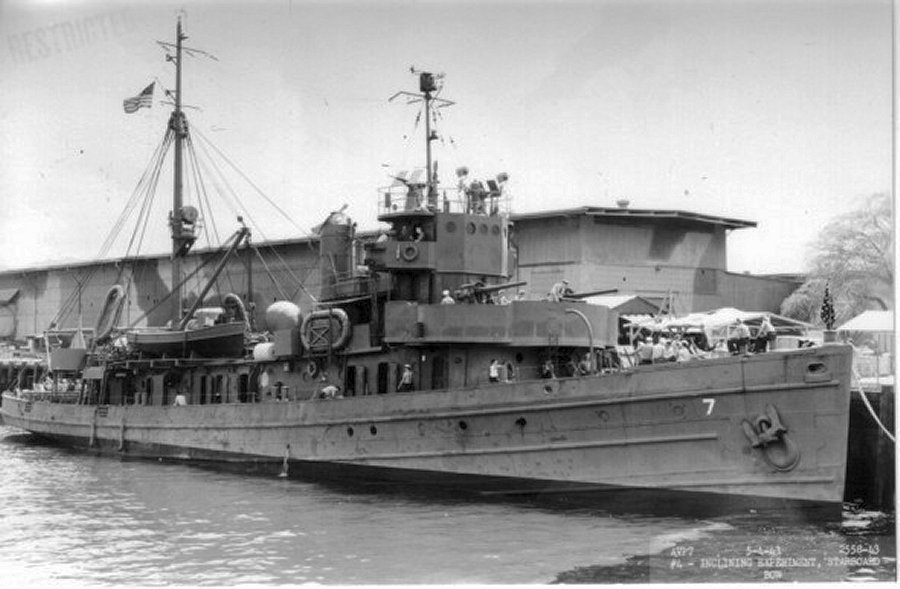

History

United States
- Name: USS Swan
- Builder: Alabama Dry Dock & Shipbuilding Co., Mobile, Alabama
- Laid down: 10 December 1917
- Launched: 4 July 1918
- Commissioned: 31 January 1919, as Minesweeper No.34
- Decommissioned: 13 December 1945
- Reclassified: AM-34, 17 July 1920; AVP-7, 22 January 1936
- Stricken: 8 January 1946
- Honors and awards: 1 battle star (World War II)
- Fate: Transferred to the Maritime Commission, 12 October 1946

General characteristics
- Class & type: Lapwing-class minesweeper
- Displacement: 950 long tons (965 t)
- Length: 187 ft 10 in (57.25 m)
- Beam: 35 ft 6 in (10.82 m)
- Draft: 9 ft 9 in (2.97 m)
- Speed: 14 knots (26 km/h; 16 mph)
- Complement: 72
- Armament: 2 × 3 in (76 mm) guns; 2 × machine guns

The first USS Swan (AM-34/AVP-7) was a Lapwing-class minesweeper acquired by the United States Navy.

Swan, a minesweeper, was laid down at Mobile, Alabama, on 10 December 1917 by the Alabama Dry Dock & Shipbuilding Co.; launched on Independence Day 1918; sponsored by Miss Hazel Donaldson; and commissioned at New Orleans, Louisiana, on 31 January 1919.

== North Sea mine clearance operations ==
Almost immediately, Swan prepared to sail to Scotland, to participate in clearing the huge North Sea Mine Barrage laid in 1918 to prevent warships and submarines of German High Seas Fleet from breaking out into the Atlantic. Assigned to Division Five, North Sea Minesweeping Detachment, Swan arrived at Kirkwall, Scotland, with the first wave of twelve minesweepers on 20 April 1919. Under the command of Rear Admiral Joseph Strauss, who broke his flag in tender Black Hawk (Destroyer Tender No. 9), the minesweepers began operations out of Inverness Firth nine days later.

Their task was monumental, as the American minesweepers (in company with modified sub chasers and British minesweepers) were tasked with sweeping over 70,000 mines laid in an area roughly 240 miles (390 km) long by 25 miles (40 km) wide, or over 6,000 square miles (16,000 km^{2}). Swan conducted mine sweeping operations for the next five months, spending 108 of those days at sea. Some diversion from the grueling, dangerous work was provided by the thousands of fish killed by the exploding mines, which providing an abundance of cod and herring for the Mine Detachments' cooks. Sailing for home on 1 October, the detachment made stops at Devonport, England; Brest, France; Lisbon, Portugal; the Azores; and Bermuda; before arriving in New York on 20 November.

== Post-World War I Atlantic operations ==
Assigned to Division 2 of Mine Squadron 2 of the Atlantic Fleet, Swan completed final acceptance trials in the spring of 1920 and began routine operations out of Portsmouth, New Hampshire, in late June. These operations included buoy work and wreck salvage, and the latter duty is what brought the minesweeper into Cape Cod Bay in November of that year. On 28 November, during an attempt to refloat a wrecked oil barge, heavy seas came up quickly and cast Swan on the beach in Cape Cod Bay. The sudden disaster stranded the minesweeper on the beach and mountainous seas threatened to wreck the stricken ship. Rapid response by the Gurnet Beach Coast Guard crew saved the day, however, and the Coast Guards' heroic efforts brought all fifty-six sailors to safety through breeches buoy and surfboat.

The stranded minesweeper survived the winter on the beach and was refloated on 22 February 1921 and towed to Portsmouth, New Hampshire, for repairs. During that process Swan decommissioned there on 23 May 1922 before being placed in commission again on 23 June 1923. That fall, she was assigned to the Washington Navy Yard but operated out of Quantico, Virginia, where she provided target and other fleet services. By the spring of 1926, Swan changed duty stations again, this time working for the 15th Naval District out of Coco Solo in the Panama Canal Zone. On 30 April 1931, while still in the Canal Zone, she was designated a "minesweeper for duty with aircraft," presaging her later change of designation. She decommissioned again on 21 December 1933, this time at San Diego, California. A little over three months later, on 2 April 1934, the minesweeper was commissioned for the third time and reassigned to the Fleet Air Base at Pearl Harbor. On 22 January 1936, Swan was officially redesignated a small seaplane tender, AVP-7.

== Search for Amelia Earhart ==
In anticipation of Amelia Earhart's flight from Howland Island to Honolulu, the Swan was one of two ships directed by the Chief of Naval Operations to act as a plane guard. The third ship, the Itasca, was a Coast Guard Cutter. On 23 June 1937, the Swan took its position halfway between Howland Island and Oahu. According to Earhart's telegrammed instructions from Bandong, Java, As she neared the Swan's location, she would ask the ship to transmit its call station by voice for five minutes, repeated twice at the end of each minute. When Earhart and Noonan failed to arrive at Howland Island on 2 July 1937, the 'Swan participated in the Earhart Search for 14 days: first, proceeding to the area around Canton Island and then west to the Gilbert Islands. The Swan was recalled to Pearl Harbor on 16 July 1937.

== Under attack at Pearl Harbor ==
For the next five years, Swan operated as a tender for Patrol Wing (PatWing) 2 out of Pearl Harbor. On the morning of 7 December 1941, she was resting on the Marine Railway dock at Pearl Harbor when Japanese planes swooped in on the ships in the harbor. Her crew saw the first bomb dropped on the south ramp of the Fleet Air Base at 0755. Eight minutes later, she opened fire with her 3-inch anti-aircraft battery. The next few hours were so hectic for her that her crew could not maintain a chronological log of the action, but they did claim an enemy aircraft for their 3-inch battery. Though she had been in drydock for boiler upkeep, her engineers had her ready to refloat by 1315.

== World War II Pacific Theater operations ==
Swan remained in Pearl Harbor for another month, assisting in the salvage work. Then, on 8 January 1942, she got underway for American Samoa. She arrived at Pago Pago on the 18th and remained until 25 July, except for a voyage to the Danger Islands in mid-March to rescue three naval airmen who survived 34 days at sea and had landed on the island of Puka Puka, and a month-long visit to Wallis Island from late May to early July. She headed back to Pearl Harbor on the 25th and arrived on 4 August. She was overhauled there and, after loading ammunition and supplies at Kaneohe Naval Air Station, from 28 to 30 October got underway to return to the South Pacific. On this voyage, she visited Canton Island, Suva in the Fiji Islands, Funafuti in the Ellice Islands, Gardner Island, Sydney Island, Hull Island, and Palmyra Island. She departed Palmyra Island on 8 December and returned to Pearl Harbor on the 13th. Swan put to sea again on the 30th to carry supplies to Canton Island. She unloaded her cargo there on 7 January 1943 and reentered Pearl Harbor on the 16th. The tender remained at Pearl Harbor until 12 March when she sailed to Johnston Island to tow YC-811 back to Pearl Harbor.

Swan returned to Pearl Harbor on 23 March and, from then until the beginning of May, she assisted the fleet air wing by towing targets for bombing practice. From 8 to 22 May, she made a voyage to Tern Island of French Frigate Shoals, located about halfway between the main Hawaiian Islands and Midway Island. Upon her return to Pearl Harbor, she resumed target-towing duties, this time for torpedo bombers. Between 1 and 7 June, she made another round-trip voyage to French Frigate Shoals and back, then resumed target towing and torpedo recovery duty.

For the next two years, Swan's area of operations was confined to the immediate vicinity of the major islands of the Territory of Hawaii. She continued to participate in training missions by towing targets and recovering torpedoes for both planes and ships. She also transported passengers and cargo between the islands and rendered other auxiliary services.

== Post-World War II operations ==
By June 1945, she was in the Consolidated Shipyard, in Los Angeles, California, undergoing a major overhaul. She remained there through the month of July and into August. On 13 August, Swan headed back to Pearl Harbor and arrived on the 21st. She resumed her routine until 6 October, when she set sail for San Diego, California. After a two-day stop there, on the 15th and 16th, she continued on to the Panama Canal. She arrived at Coco Solo in the Canal Zone on 28 October and, two days later, continued on to Boston, Massachusetts. She reported to the Commandant, 1st Naval District, at Boston on 9 November.

== Decommissioning ==
On 13 December 1945, pursuant to the findings of a board of inspection and survey, Swan was decommissioned at Boston, Massachusetts. Her name was struck from the Navy List on 8 January 1946 and, just over nine months later, on 12 October, her hulk was delivered to the Maritime Commission at Newport, Rhode Island, for disposal.

== Awards ==
USS Swan earned one battle star during World War II.
