= USS Ortolan (AM-45) =

Minesweeper of the United States Navy

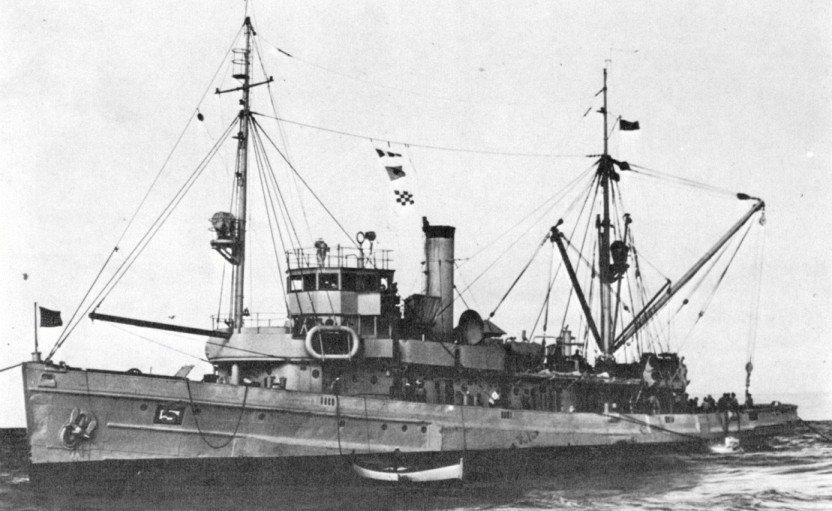

History

United States
- Name: USS Ortolan
- Builder: Staten Island Shipbuilding Company, New York City
- Laid down: 9 July 1918
- Launched: 30 January 1919
- Commissioned: 17 September 1919, as Minesweeper No.45
- Decommissioned: 18 March 1947
- Reclassified: AM-45, 17 July 1920; ASR-5, 12 September 1929
- Stricken: 10 June 1947
- Honours and awards: 1 battle star (World War II)
- Fate: Sold, 20 August 1947

General characteristics
- Class & type: Lapwing-class minesweeper
- Displacement: 1,009 long tons (1,025 t) full load
- Length: 187 ft 10 in (57.25 m)
- Beam: 35 ft 6 in (10.82 m)
- Draft: 10 ft 4 in (3.15 m)
- Propulsion: Harlan and Hollingsworth vertical triple expansion steam engine, 1 shaft
- Speed: 14 knots (26 km/h; 16 mph)
- Complement: 72
- Armament: 2 × 3"/50 caliber guns; 2 × 20 mm guns

The first USS Ortolan(AM-45/ASR-5) was a Lapwing-class minesweeper in the United States Navy. She was later converted to a submarine rescue ship. She was named after the ortolan, a European bunting.

Ortolan was laid down 9 July 1918 by the Staten Island Shipbuilding Company, New York City, United States; launched 30 January 1919; sponsored by Miss Theresa M. Finn; and commissioned 17 September 1919.

== U.S. west coast operations ==
Assigned to the Pacific Fleet, Ortolan got underway for the west coast 10 November 1919. Following stops at east and U.S. Gulf coast ports, Puerto Rico, and Cuba, she arrived at San Diego, California, 13 June 1920. Nine days later she sailed north to Bremerton, Washington, where she remained, with a caretaker crew, until 23 March 1921.

Then returning to Southern California, she served as a tugboat for a year and on 3 May 1922 decommissioned at Mare Island, California. Recommissioned 11 July, she assumed the duties of tender at the Submarine Base, San Pedro, Los Angeles. From 9 June to 25 August 1923 she conducted cold weather operations off Alaska in her first extended cruise as flagship, Commander, Composite Submarine Squadrons Pacific in company with USS Beaver and four S-class submarines. While in Anchorage, Alaska on 17 July 1923 the submarine USS S-38 was accidentally sunk alongside Ortolan during maintenance, but was quickly raised and there was no loss of life though the submarine's motors were damaged requiring tow by Ortolan.

During September she assisted in the salvage of the seven destroyers wrecked in the Honda Point Disaster, earlier in the month, then resumed tender operations out of San Pedro, Los Angeles. Operating from there until 1927, she ranged the west coast of the Americas from Panama to Oregon – and once, January–April 1924, cruised in the Caribbean on fleet maneuvers.

In July 1927 she steamed west, accompanying Holland (AS-3) and two divisions of "S"-boats to Pearl Harbor. The following month she assisted in the search for competitors lost during the "Dole Race", the first flight linking the West Coast and Hawaii. In September she resumed her west coast tender activities and for another two years ranged the eastern Pacific as submarines conducted training exercises.

== Redesignated as submarine rescue vessel ==
Redesignated a submarine rescue vessel ASR–5 on 12 September 1929, Ortolan's mission changed, but, throughout the 1930s, her area of operations continued, with brief exceptions for fleet problems and, in 1936, a four-month tour at Pearl Harbor, in the California area. In 1939 the Ortolan assisted in the recovery of the USS Squalus off Portsmouth, NH.

== Japanese attack at Pearl Harbor ==
On 10 December 1941, Ortolan sailed west again and on the 21st arrived at Pearl Harbor to assist in the staggering salvage job which was the aftermath of the Japanese attack two weeks earlier. For the next half year she worked on, and finally floated, Oglala (CM-4). On 18 July 1942, she reported for a year's tour with Pearl Harbor based submarines, recovering torpedoes and assisting in preparations for war patrols. She then trained Navy divers and in October prepared for combat duty with the installation of new sound gear and new armament, two 3-inch and two 20 mm guns.

== World War II Pacific Theatre operations ==
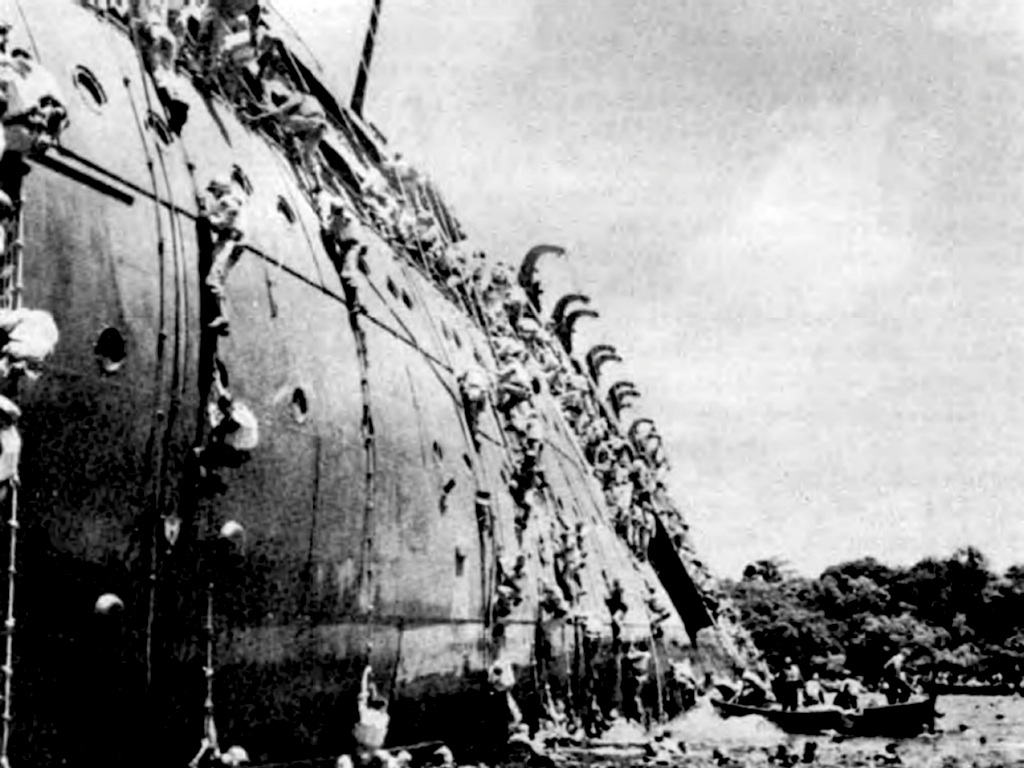
Troop transport SS President Coolidge being abandoned after beaching.

Heading out across the Pacific, 1 November, she arrived at Espiritu Santo on the 20th. For the next ten days she salvaged needed war supplies from the sunken Army transport SS President Coolidge. Ortolan then steamed to Tulagi to help make temporary repairs on cruisers damaged during the Battle of Tassafaronga: the USS Minneapolis (CA-36), USS New Orleans and USS Pensacola. The cruisers sailed 12 days later and Ortolan commenced a busy two months during which she assisted vessels, PT boats to destroyers and transports, surveyed sunken Japanese and recovered downed "Zeros" for intelligence evaluation.

"Intelligence gathering" extended well into 1943 as Ortolan took on the salvaging of two Japanese submarines, one a two-man "midget", the other a 320-foot boat loaded with supplies. Both lay in the waters off Guadalcanal's northern coast. Although frequently interrupted for other, more pressing, salvage or repair jobs, Ortolan raised the "midget" and towed her to Kukum Bay in May, and, in June delivered her to Nouméa. The other was the I-1 which was partially submerged, divers recovered many documents which were quickly flown to Pearl Harbor.

== Return to stateside operations ==
Overhaul at Auckland followed and in October she returned to the Solomon Islands. There, and in the New Hebrides, she continued salvage work into 1944. On 17 January, she departed for Nouméa, heading east. After abbreviated transport and submarine training duties en route, she arrived at San Pedro 4 March 1944. At the end of April she reported for duty with the Western Sea Frontier and for the ensuing 18 months operated as escort and torpedo recovery vessel for submarines conducting exercises off California.

== Pacific post-war operations ==
Two months after the formal Japanese surrender Ortolan again headed west. She trained Navy divers at Pearl Harbor until April 1946, then got underway for the Far East. Arriving at Qingdao, China, 18 May, she operated with U.S. 7th Fleet submarines and conducted diving operations until November. On the 13th she sailed homeward, arriving at San Francisco, California, 24 December.

== Decommissioning ==
Decommissioned 18 March 1947, Ortolan was struck from the Navy List 10 June, and was sold by the United States Maritime Commission 20 August 1947 to Bay Cities Transportation Co.

== Awards ==
Ortolan (ASR–5) earned one battle star during World War II.
