= USS Swallow (AM-4) =

Minesweeper of the United States Navy

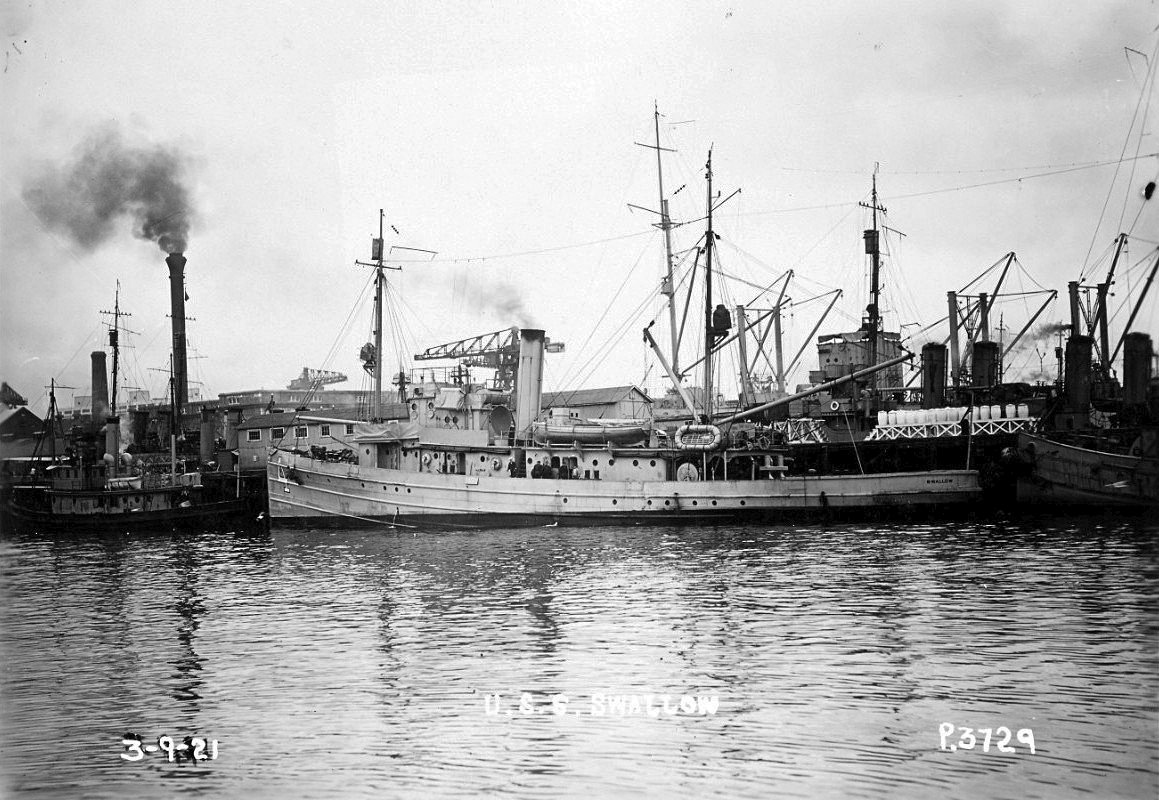
- Swallow serving as an Alaska radio station tender, 9 March 1921

History

United States
- Name: USS Swallow
- Builder: Todd Shipyard Co., New York
- Laid down: 18 March 1918
- Launched: 4 July 1918
- Commissioned: 8 October 1918
- Stricken: 5 May 1938
- Fate: Ran aground at Kanaga Island, Alaska, 19 February 1938

General characteristics
- Class & type: Lapwing-class minesweeper
- Displacement: 950 long tons (965 t) est.
- Length: 187 ft 10 in (57.25 m)
- Beam: 35 ft 6 in (10.82 m)
- Draft: 9 ft 10 in (3.00 m)
- Speed: 14 knots (26 km/h; 16 mph)
- Complement: 78
- Armament: 2 × 3 in (76 mm) guns

USS Swallow (AM-4) was a U.S. Navy Lapwing-class minesweeper. Swallow was laid down at New York City on 18 March 1918 by the Todd Shipyard Corp.; launched on Independence Day 1918; sponsored by Miss Sara V. Brereton; and commissioned on 8 October 1918. She served until 19 February 1938, when she ran aground at Kanaga Island.

== History ==
=== North Atlantic operations ===
Following commissioning, Swallow underwent minor adjustments and prepared for foreign service. On 6 April 1919, she steamed out of Boston Harbor, bound for Inverness, Scotland. There she joined the Minesweeping Detachment of the Northern Barrage. For most of the remainder of 1919. Swallow swept mines from the North Sea Mine Barrage laid by the Allied and Associated Powers during World War I.

=== West Coast operations ===
The minesweeper returned to the United States late in 1919 and put into the navy yard at Charleston, South Carolina, for overhaul and repairs. Early in 1920, she sailed for the U.S. West Coast and then north to Bremerton, Washington. For the next 18 years, Swallow operated along the northwestern Pacific coast of North America, spending much of her time in Alaskan waters. In 1934, she became a unit of the Aleutian Islands Survey Expedition.

=== Swallow runs aground ===
On 19 February 1938, Swallow ran aground at Kanaga Island and was stranded there. The crew was rescued by USCGC Spencer (WPG-36), which was cited by the Department of the Navy for the rescue. Salvage efforts soon proved impracticable and her name was struck from the Navy Directory on 5 May 1938.

== Notes ==
Citations

References used

This article incorporates text from the public domain Dictionary of American Naval Fighting Ships. The entry can be found here.

- "Edward H. Smith Biography" (PDF). Retired U.S. Coast Guard Flag Officers. U.S. Coast Guard Historian's Office.
