= USS Chase (DE-158) =

Buckley-class destroyer escort

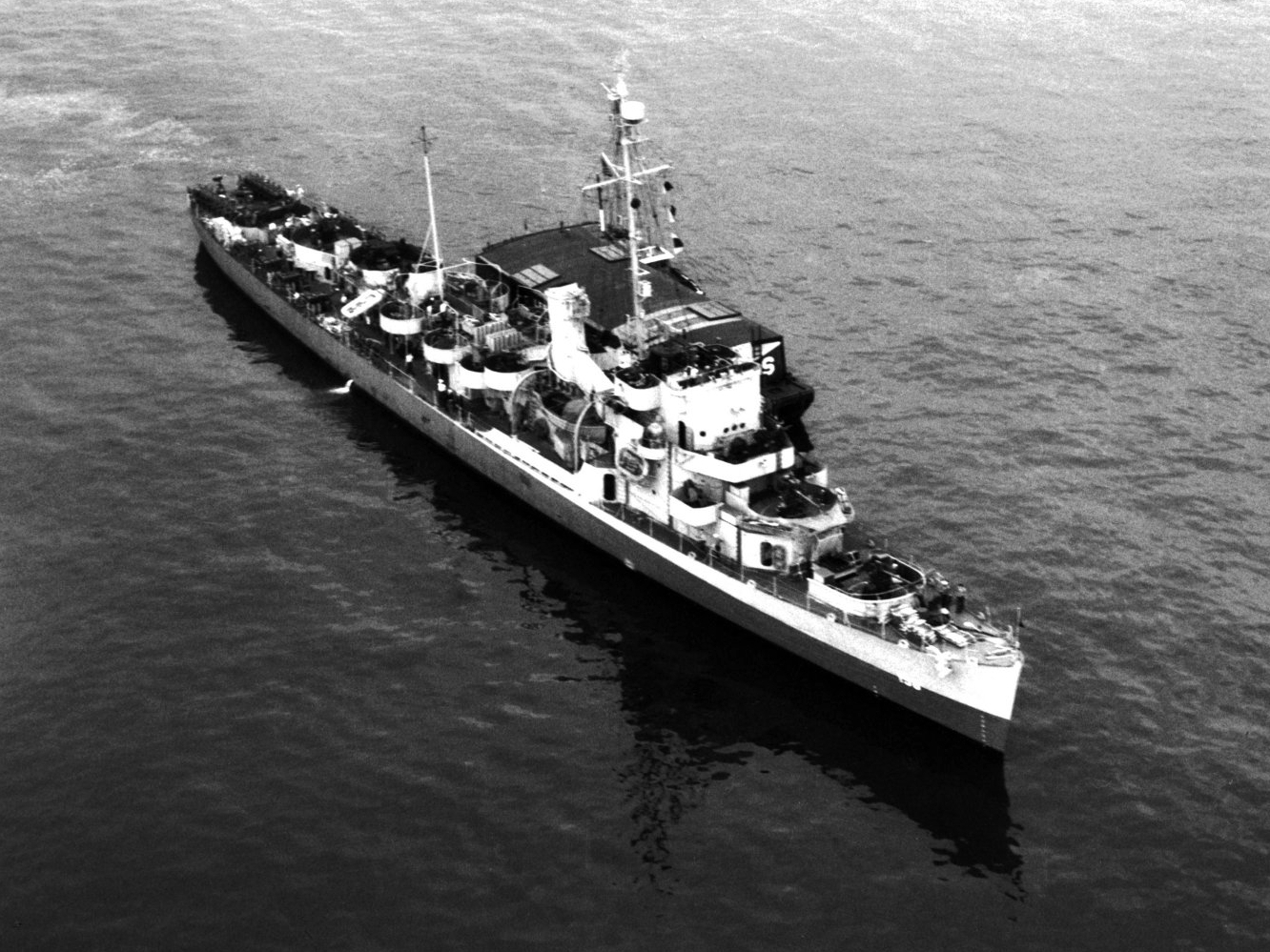

History

United States
- Name: USS Chase
- Namesake: Jehu V. Chase
- Ordered: 1942
- Builder: Norfolk Navy Yard, Portsmouth, Virginia
- Laid down: 16 March 1943
- Launched: 24 April 1943
- Commissioned: 18 July 1943
- Decommissioned: 15 January 1946
- Reclassified: APD-54, 24 November 1944
- Stricken: 7 February 1946
- Honors and awards: 2 battle stars (World War II)
- Fate: Sold for scrap, 13 November 1946

General characteristics
- Class & type: Buckley-class destroyer escort
- Displacement: 1,400 long tons (1,422 t) standard; 1,740 long tons (1,768 t) full load
- Length: 306 ft (93 m)
- Beam: 37 ft (11 m)
- Draft: 9 ft 6 in (2.90 m) standard; 11 ft 3 in (3.43 m) full load
- Propulsion: 2 × boilers; General Electric turbo-electric drive; 12,000 shp (8.9 MW); 2 × solid manganese-bronze 3,600 lb (1,600 kg) 3-bladed propellers, 8 ft 6 in (2.59 m) diameter, 7 ft 7 in (2.31 m) pitch; 2 × rudders; 359 tons fuel oil
- Speed: 23 knots (43 km/h; 26 mph)
- Range: 3,700 nmi (6,900 km) at 15 kn (28 km/h; 17 mph); 6,000 nmi (11,000 km) at 12 kn (22 km/h; 14 mph)
- Complement: 15 officers, 198 men
- Armament: 3 × 3"/50 caliber guns; 1 × quad 1.1"/75 caliber gun; 8 × single 20 mm guns; 1 × triple 21 inch (533 mm) torpedo tubes; 1 × Hedgehog anti-submarine mortar; 8 × K-gun depth charge projectors; 2 × depth charge tracks

USS Chase (DE-158/APD-54) was a Buckley-class destroyer escort in service with the United States Navy from 1943 to 1946. She was scrapped in 1946.

== History ==
USS Chase was named in honor of Admiral Jehu V. Chase (1869–1937). She was launched 24 April 1943 by Norfolk Navy Yard; sponsored by Mrs. J. V. Chase; and commissioned 18 July 1943.

=== Battle of the Atlantic ===
Between 14 September 1943 and 23 November 1944, Chase escorted six transatlantic convoys between New York and Norfolk, Virginia and North African ports. During her second such crossing, while approaching Bizerte on 20 April 1944, Chase fired on attacking enemy torpedo bombers, driving them off, then rescued swimming survivors from three torpedoed merchant ships. During the return passage, Chase joined in the search for the U-967, which torpedoed Fechteler (DE-157) on 5 May, and rescued 52 survivors of the sinking.

Chase was converted to a Charles Lawrence-class high speed transport, reclassified APD-54 on 24 November 1944, and with conversion completed, sailed from Boston on 4 February 1945 for Pacific action waters.

=== Pacific War ===
She reached Ulithi on 18 March, and next day got underway for the Okinawa operation, sailing with the group scheduled to simulate a landing on the southern coast of the island as a diversion from the main assaults. This diversion received more attention from enemy aircraft than did the main landings as they made their demonstration on 1 April. Chase joined in the blaze of anti-aircraft fire which drove the enemy off, then moved north to join the anti-submarine screen protecting the landings.

Aside from two brief voyages to Guam and Ulithi, Chase continued on the dangerous duty of patrol off Okinawa until 20 May. On 20 May, Chase fired successfully on a diving kamikaze, but had to maneuver violently to avoid the falling aircraft. It splashed, a scant 10 yards (10 m) from the ship, and the explosion of the two bombs it carried ripped Chase's hull open, flooding the engine and fire rooms. With her steering gear jammed at hard left rudder, Chase drove off another suicide plane. Listing so badly as to be in danger of capsizing, Chase was kept afloat by the skillful work of her crew and towed into Kerama Retto for repairs. She was later towed across the Pacific to San Diego, arriving 11 October. Here she was decommissioned 15 January 1946, and sold for scrap on 13 November 1946.

== Awards ==
Chase received two battle stars for World War II service.
