= Fechteler =

Fechteler may refer to:

- Augustus Francis Fechteler (1857–1921), admiral in the United States Navy
- William Fechteler (1896–1967), admiral in the United States Navy who served as Chief of Naval Operations during the Eisenhower administration
- USS Fechteler, the name of more than one ship of the United States Navy
