= Dubuque-class gunboat =

1905 class of US Navy gunboats

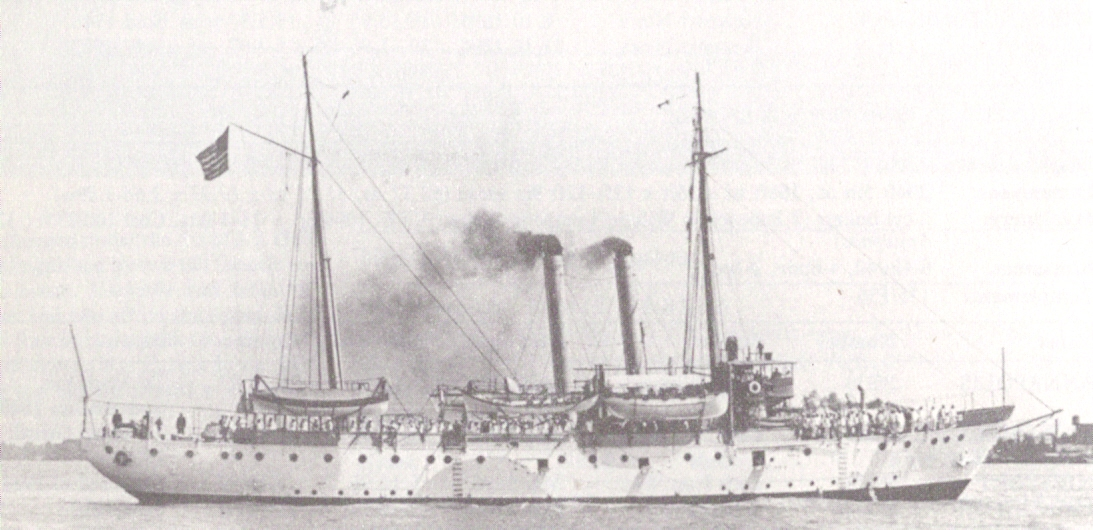
- USS Paducah (PG-18)

Class overview
- Name: Dubuque-class gunboat
- Builders: Gas Engine & Power Company & Charles L. Seabury Company, Morris Heights, New York City
- Operators: United States Navy
- Built: 1903-1905
- In commission: 1905-1946
- Planned: 2
- Completed: 2
- Retired: 2

General characteristics
- Type: Gunboat
- Displacement: 1,174 tons
- Length: 200 ft (61 m)
- Beam: 35 ft (11 m)
- Draught: 12 ft (3.7 m)
- Propulsion: 2 × 500ihp Gas Engine Power Co. vertical triple-expansion engines; 2 × 623.5ihp vertical triple-expansion engines (1921)
- Speed: 13 knots
- Complement: 162; 161 (1921)
- Armament: 1905-; 6 × 4 in (100 mm)/40 cal rapid-fire guns; 4 × 6-pounder (57 mm (2.2 in)) rapid-fire guns; 2 × 1-pounder (37 mm (1.5 in)) rapid-fire guns; 1 × .30 cal Colt machine gun; 1911-; 6 × 4 in (100 mm)/50 cal rapid-fire guns; 4 × 6-pounder (57 mm (2.2 in)) rapid-fire guns; 2 × 1-pounder (37 mm (1.5 in)) rapid-fire guns; 1918-; 4 × 4 in (100 mm)/50 cal rapid-fire guns; 4 × 6-pounder (57 mm (2.2 in)) rapid-fire guns; 1921-; 4 × 4 in (100 mm)/50 cal rapid-fire guns; 1 × 3 in (76 mm)/23 cal anti-aircraft gun; 1940-; 1 × 5 in (130 mm)/38 cal DP gun; 2 × 4 in (100 mm)/50 cal guns; 1 × 3 in (76 mm)/50 cal anti-aircraft gun

The Dubuque class gunboats were a class of gunboats built by the United States prior to World War I. The class was designed in 1903. The United States Navy commissioned 2 Dubuque-class gunboats in 1903. Dubuques had a design speed of 12 knots, and a main armament of six 4" rapid-fire guns and four 6-pounder rapid-fire guns in single mounts.

== Design ==
In 1902, two gunboats, Dubuque and Paducah were ordered from Gas Engine & Power Company & Charles L. Seabury Company of New York for survey and patrol duties in the Caribbean. They were 174 feet (53.04 m) long between perpendiculars and 200 feet 5 inches (61.09 m) long overall, with an unusual high and rounded bow, fitted with a bowsprit. Beam was 35 feet (10.67 m) with a draft of 13 feet 4 inches (4.06 m). Displacement was 1,084 long tons (1,101 t). The hull was of composite construction, with steel above the waterline and wood below. Two Babcock & Wilcox boilers fed vertical triple-expansion steam engines rated at 1,250 indicated horsepower (930 kW), driving two shafts and giving a speed of 13 knots (24 km/h; 15 mph). Two tall and thin funnels were fitted.

== Ships ==
Ship	Laid down	Launched	Completed	Fate
Dubuque	22 September 1903	15 August 1904	31 May 1905	Sold 19 December 1946
Paducah	22 September 1903	11 October 1904	31 August 1905	Sold 19 December 1946; Purchased by Haganah and renamed Geulah, caught trying to smuggle Jewish refugees to Palestine 2 October 1947. Merchant ship 1948, scrapped 1951.

== Bibliography ==
- Priolo, Gary. "PG-18 Paducah". NavSource.
- Radigan, Joseph M. (30 January 2025). "PG-17 Dubuque". NavSource.
- Chesneau, Roger; Kolesnik, Eugene M., eds. (1979). Conway's All the World's Fighting Ships 1860–1905. London: Conway Maritime Press. ISBN 0-85177-133-5.
- Friedman, Norman (1987). U.S. Small Combatants: Including PT-Boats, Subchasers and the Brown Water Navy. Annapolis, Maryland: Naval Institute Press. ISBN 0-87021-713-5.
- "Dubuque (Gunboat No. 17) i 1905-1946". Dictionary of American Naval Fighting Ships. Naval History and Heritage Command. 7 July 2015.
- "Paducah (Gunboat No. 18) i". Dictionary of American Naval Fighting Ships. Naval History and Heritage Command. 18 August 2015.
