= Judge Hoffman =

Judge Hoffman may refer to:

- Julius Hoffman (1895–1983), judge of the United States District Court for the Northern District of Illinois
- Ogden Hoffman Jr. (1822–1891), judge of the United States District Court for the District of California, and later for the Northern and Southern Districts of California
- Walter Edward Hoffman (1907–1996), judge of the United States District Court for the Eastern District of Virginia
