= USS Dubuque (PG-17) =

Gunboat of the United States Navy

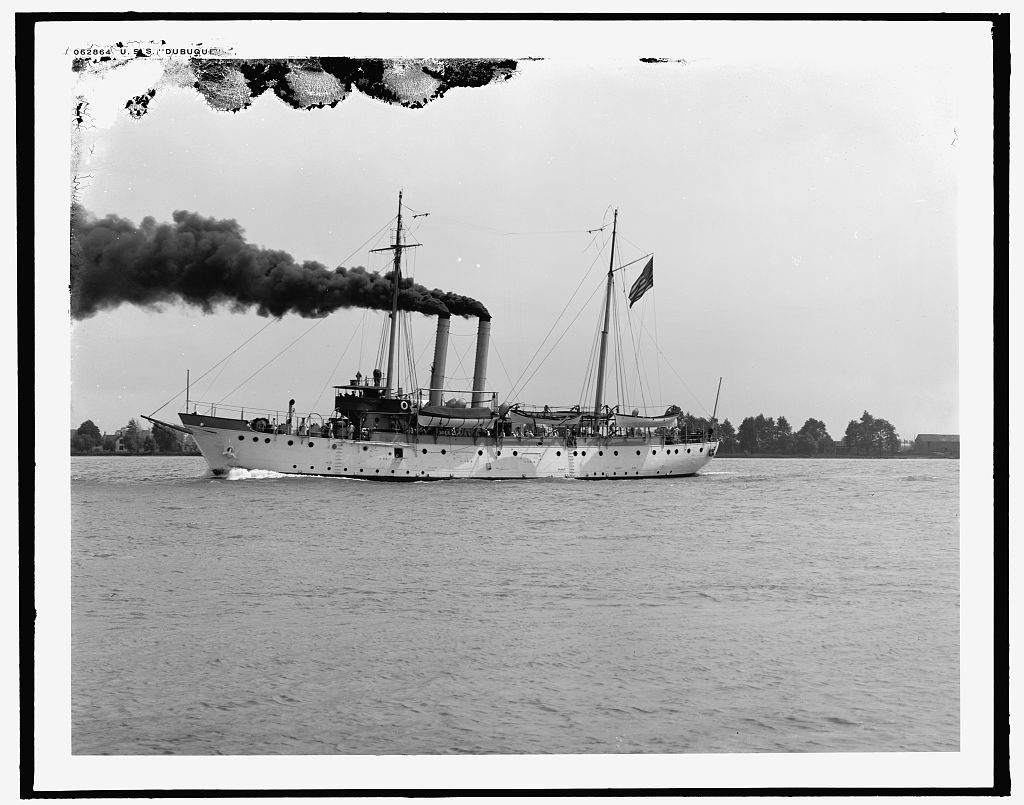
- USS Dubuque (PG-17)

History

United States
- Name: Dubuque
- Namesake: City of Dubuque, Iowa
- Builder: Gas Engine and Power Co. and Charles L. Seabury Co., Morris Heights, New York
- Laid down: 22 September 1903
- Launched: 15 August 1904
- Commissioned: 3 June 1905
- Decommissioned: 22 July 1911
- Recommissioned: 4 August 1914
- Decommissioned: 27 May 1919
- Recommissioned: 25 May 1922
- Decommissioned: 7 September 1945
- Reclassified: AG-6 (Miscellaneous Auxiliary), 1919; IX-9 (Unclassified Miscellaneous Unit), 24 April 1922; PG-17 (Patrol Gunboat), 4 November 1940
- Fate: Transferred to Maritime Commission for disposal, 19 December 1946

General characteristics
- Class & type: Dubuque-class gunboat
- Displacement: 1,237 long tons (1,257 t)
- Length: 200 ft (61 m)
- Beam: 35 ft (11 m)
- Draft: 12 ft (3.7 m)
- Propulsion: 2 × 500ihp Gas Engine Power Co. vertical triple-expansion engines; 2 × 596.5ihp vertical triple-expansion engines (1921)
- Speed: 12 knots (22 km/h; 14 mph); 12.9 knots (23.9 km/h; 14.8 mph) (1921)
- Complement: 162
- Armament: 1905–; 6 × 4 in (100 mm)/40 cal rapid fire guns; 4 × 6-pounder (57 mm (2.2 in)) rapid fire guns; 2 × 1-pounder (37 mm (1.5 in)) rapid fire guns; 1 × .30 cal Colt machine gun; 1911–; 6 × 4 in (100 mm)/50 cal rapid fire guns; 4 × 6-pounder (57 mm (2.2 in)) rapid fire guns; 2 × 1-pounder (37 mm (1.5 in)) rapid fire guns; 1918–; 4 × 4 in (100 mm)/50 cal rapid fire guns; 4 × 6-pounder (57 mm (2.2 in)) rapid fire guns; 1921–; 4 × 4 in (100 mm)/50 cal rapid fire guns; 1 × 3 in (76 mm)/23 cal anti-aircraft gun; 1940–; 1 × 5 in (130 mm)/38 cal DP guns; 2 × 4 in (100 mm)/50 cal guns; 1 × 3 in (76 mm)/50 cal DP guns anti-aircraft gun

USS Dubuque (PG-17) was a United States Navy patrol combatant ship that served in both World War I and World War II. She was named for Dubuque, Iowa.

She was launched 15 August 1904, by Gas Engine and Power Co. and Charles L. Seabury Co., Morris Heights, New York; sponsored by Miss M. Tredway. She was commissioned on 3 June 1905, commanded by Lieutenant Commander Augustus F. Fechteler. She was reclassified AG-6 in 1919; IX-9, 24 April 1922; and PG-17, 4 November 1940.

== Service history ==
=== 1905–1911 ===
Dubuque was used in various services to the US Government during its initial years. On occasion it was used for guarded transport of government supplies, as well as serving as official transport for bodily remains of deceased government dignitaries such as James Wilson, US Supreme Court.

Dubuque cruised from her home port of Portsmouth, New Hampshire in Atlantic coastal waters and in the Caribbean protecting American interests and citizens, a group of whom she saved from depredations by Cuban bandits on the night of 18–19 May 1907. She arrived at Chicago, Illinois on 29 June 1911, and was decommissioned 22 July for use as a training ship by the Illinois Naval Militia.

=== 1914–1919 ===
Recommissioned on 4 August 1914, Dubuque sailed three days later for Portsmouth, New Hampshire, where she was placed in commission in reserve 3 October. She was fitted out as a mine-training ship and on 30 July 1915 she returned to a fully commissioned status and was assigned to Mining and Minesweeping Division, Atlantic Fleet. She participated in training along the Atlantic coast and after American entry into World War I in April 1917, she installed and tended submarine nets in Hampton Roads and at New London, Connecticut. She also trained reserve officers at the Naval Academy.

Assigned to temporary duty with the Cruiser and Transport Force, Dubuque made three voyages between New York and Halifax, Nova Scotia, as a convoy escort between 6 June and 14 July 1917. She arrived at St. Thomas, Virgin Islands on 3 August for duty with the French division of the Caribbean Patrol, investigating isolated harbors and inlets in the Caribbean and on the coasts of Venezuela and Colombia to prevent their use by German submarines. On 8 December 1918, she reported to the American Patrol Detachment, Atlantic Fleet, with whom she served along the East Coast until returning to Portsmouth 6 May 1919. She again went out of commission 27 May 1919.

=== 1922–1945 ===
Dubuque was recommissioned 25 May 1922 and sailed from Portsmouth 8 June for Detroit, Michigan, where she arrived 24 June. Attached to the 9th Naval District, she took Naval Reservists on cruises from her home port of Detroit into Lakes Superior and Michigan every summer. She was placed in reduced commission 1 November 1940 and on the 14th sailed for Boston, where she was assigned to the 1st Naval District and was modernized and refitted. She returned to full commission 1 July 1941 and patrolled on the New England coast until 14 October. Two days later she arrived at Little Creek, Virginia to serve as gunnery practice ship for the Armed Guard School there. Throughout her second war, Dubuque trained merchant ship armed guard crews in Chesapeake Bay. She was decommissioned 7 September 1945 and transferred to the Maritime Commission for disposal 19 December 1946.

== Awards ==
- Cuban Pacification Medal
- World War I Victory Medal
- American Defense Service Medal
- American Campaign Medal
- World War II Victory Medal
