= William W. Morrow =

American politician and judge (1843–1929)

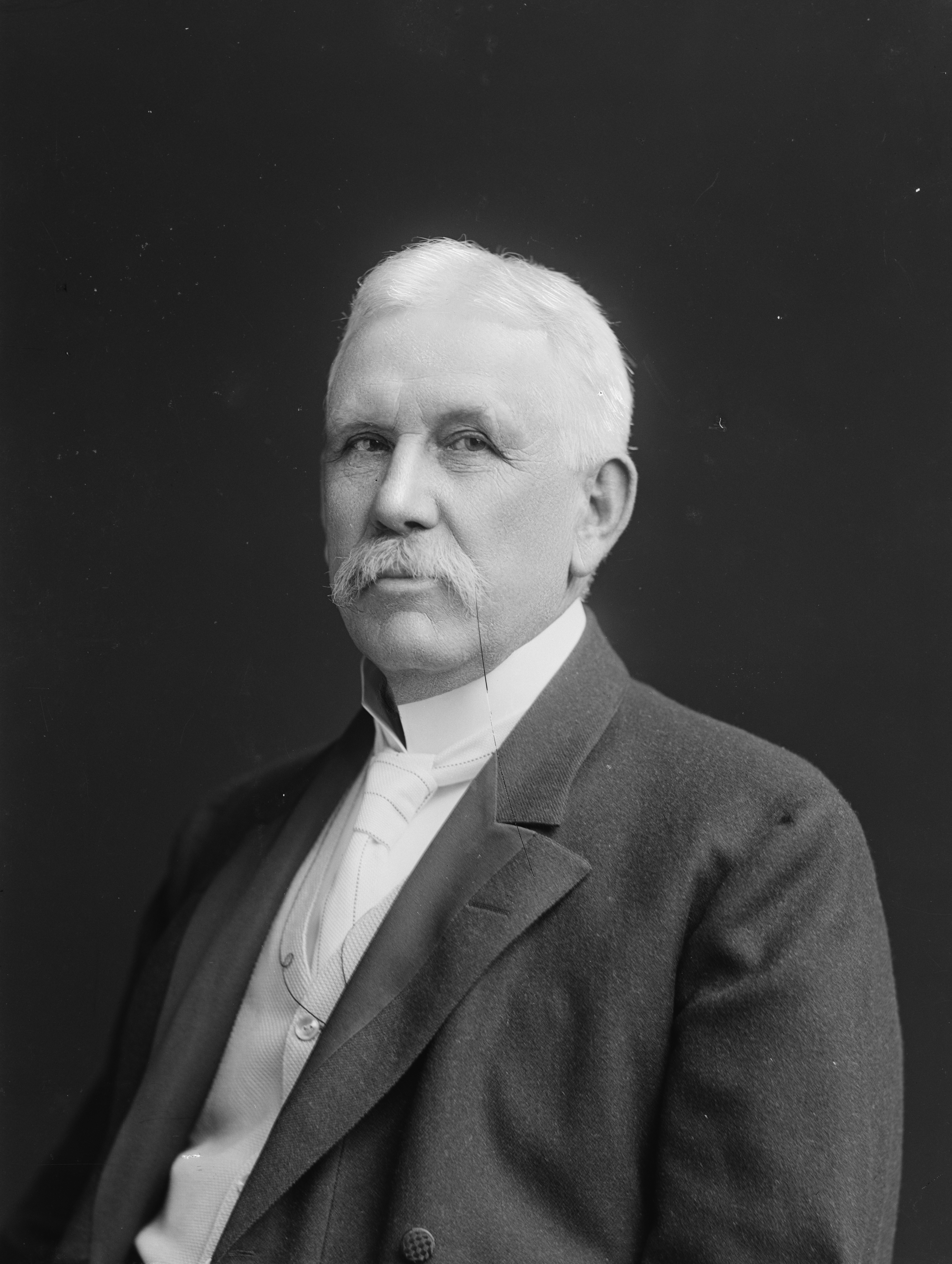
- Portrait by C. M. Bell c. 1903–1905

Senior Judge of the United States Court of Appeals for the Ninth Circuit
- In office January 1, 1923 – July 24, 1929

Judge of the United States Court of Appeals for the Ninth Circuit
- In office May 18, 1897 – January 1, 1923
- Appointed by: William McKinley
- Preceded by: Joseph McKenna
- Succeeded by: Frank H. Rudkin

Judge of the United States Circuit Courts for the Ninth Circuit
- In office May 18, 1897 – December 31, 1911
- Appointed by: William McKinley
- Preceded by: Joseph McKenna
- Succeeded by: Seat abolished

Judge of the United States District Court for the Northern District of California
- In office August 11, 1891 – June 1, 1897
- Appointed by: Benjamin Harrison
- Preceded by: Ogden Hoffman Jr.
- Succeeded by: John J. De Haven

Member of the U.S. House of Representatives from California's 4th district
- In office March 4, 1885 – March 3, 1891
- Preceded by: Pleasant B. Tully
- Succeeded by: John T. Cutting

Personal details
- Born: July 15, 1843 Milton, Indiana, US
- Died: July 24, 1929 (aged 86) San Francisco, California, US
- Resting place: Cypress Lawn Cemetery; Colma, California
- Party: Republican
- Education: Read law

William W. Morrow (July 15, 1843 – July 24, 1929) was an American politician and judge; serving at various times as a United States representative from California, a United States district judge of the United States District Court for the Northern District of California and a United States circuit judge of the United States Court of Appeals for the Ninth Circuit and the United States Circuit Courts for the Ninth Circuit.

== Education and career ==
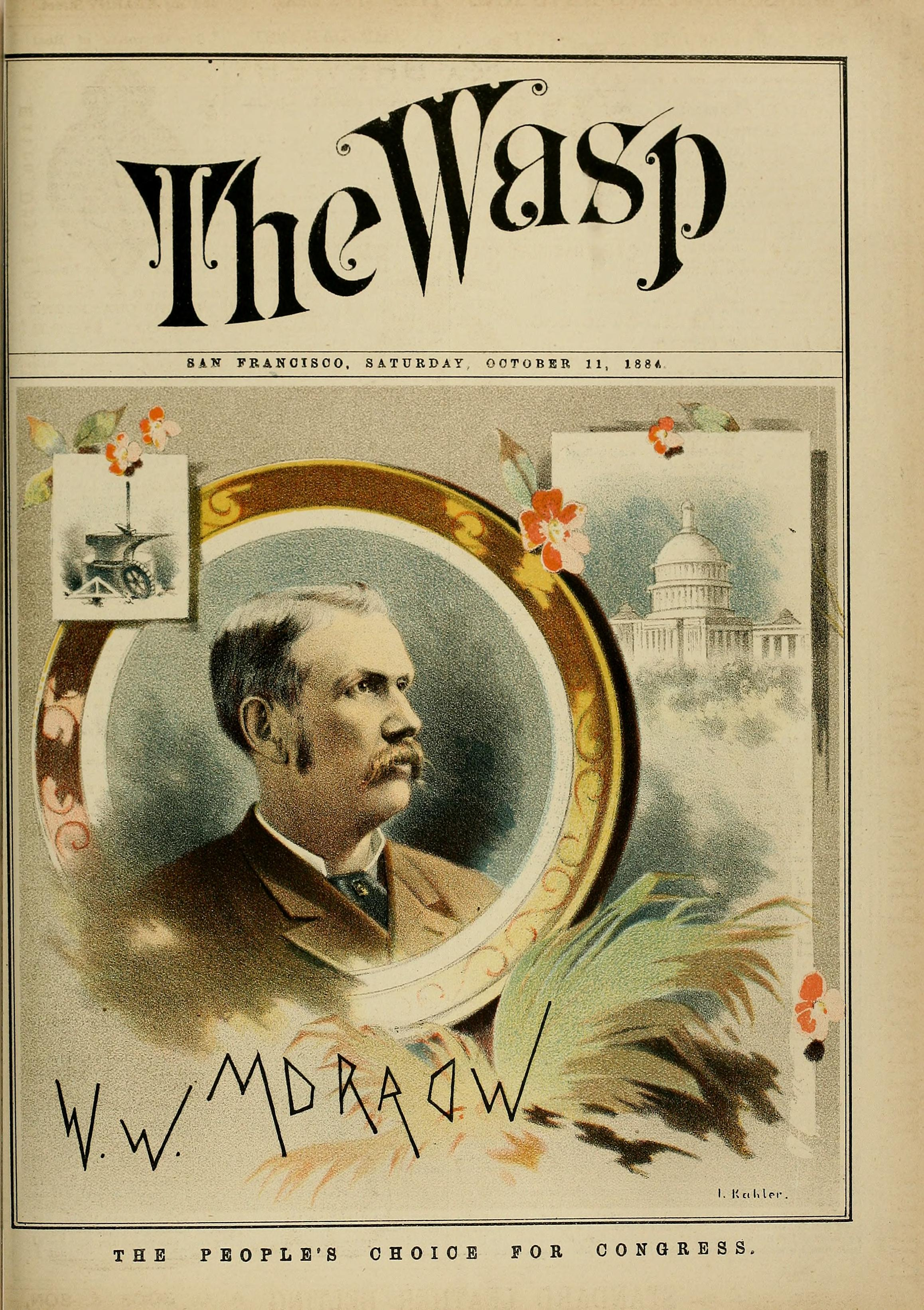
Morrow on the cover of The Wasp, October 11, 1884

Born on July 15, 1843, in Milton, Indiana, Morrow moved with his parents to Adams County, Illinois, in 1845 and attended the common schools and received private instruction. He moved to Santa Rosa, California, in 1859 and taught school and explored mining regions. He went east in 1862 during the American Civil War to join the Union Army and served with the National Rifles of the District of Columbia, an independent militia, serving in the Army of the Potomac. He was a special agent for the United States Department of the Treasury from 1865 to 1869, and was detailed to California, where he undertook confidential assignments for the United States Secretary of the Treasury.

Morrow read law and was admitted to the bar in 1869. He entered private practice in San Francisco, California, from 1869 to 1870. He was an Assistant United States Attorney for the District of California from 1870 to 1874. He assisted in organizing the San Francisco Bar Association in 1872 and served as its president in 1892 and 1893. He resumed private practice in San Francisco from 1874 to 1885. He was Chairman of the Republican state central committee of California from 1879 to 1882. He was an attorney for the California State Board of Harbor Commissioners from 1880 to 1883. He was also a special United States Attorney before the French and American Claims Commission from 1881 to 1883, and before the Alabama Claims Commission 1882 to 1885. He was a delegate to the Republican National Convention in 1884.

== Congressional service ==
Morrow was elected as a Republican from California's 4th congressional district to the United States House of Representatives of the 49th, 50th and 51st United States Congresses, serving from March 4, 1885, to March 3, 1891. As a member of Congress, Morrow was "at the forefront of the campaign" to make the federal laws restricting Chinese immigration "more severe."

He was not a candidate for renomination in 1890. He briefly returned to private practice in San Francisco in 1891.

== Federal judicial service ==
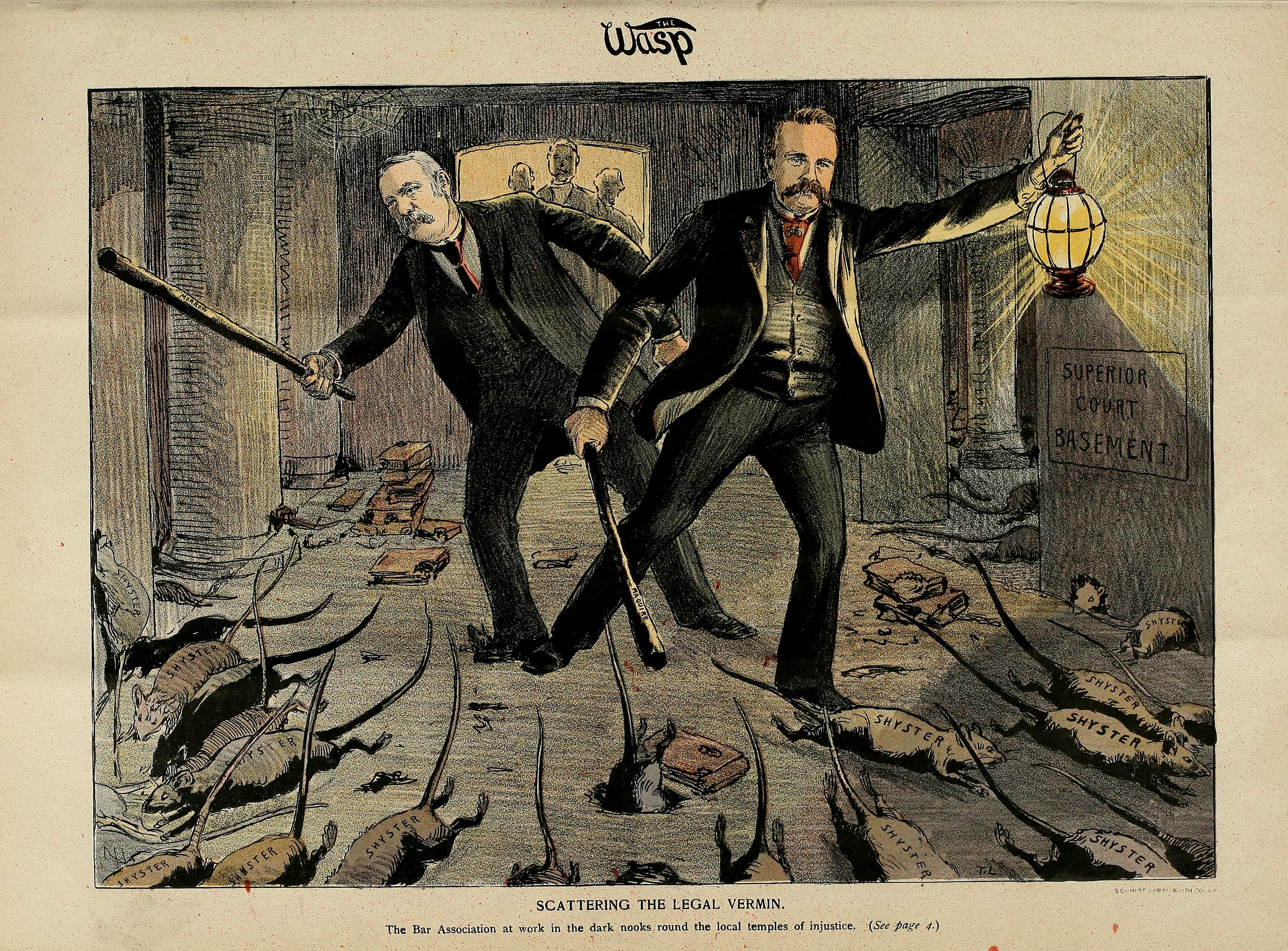
"Scattering The Legal Vermin," a political cartoon published in The Wasp depicting the efforts of Morrow and Congressman James G. Maguire to rid the San Francisco Superior Court of "shysters," February 11, 1893

Morrow received a recess appointment from President Benjamin Harrison on August 11, 1891, to a seat on the United States District Court for the Northern District of California vacated by Judge Ogden Hoffman Jr. He was nominated to the same position by President Harrison on December 10, 1891. He was confirmed by the United States Senate on January 11, 1892, and received his commission the same day. His service terminated on June 1, 1897, due to his elevation to the Ninth Circuit.

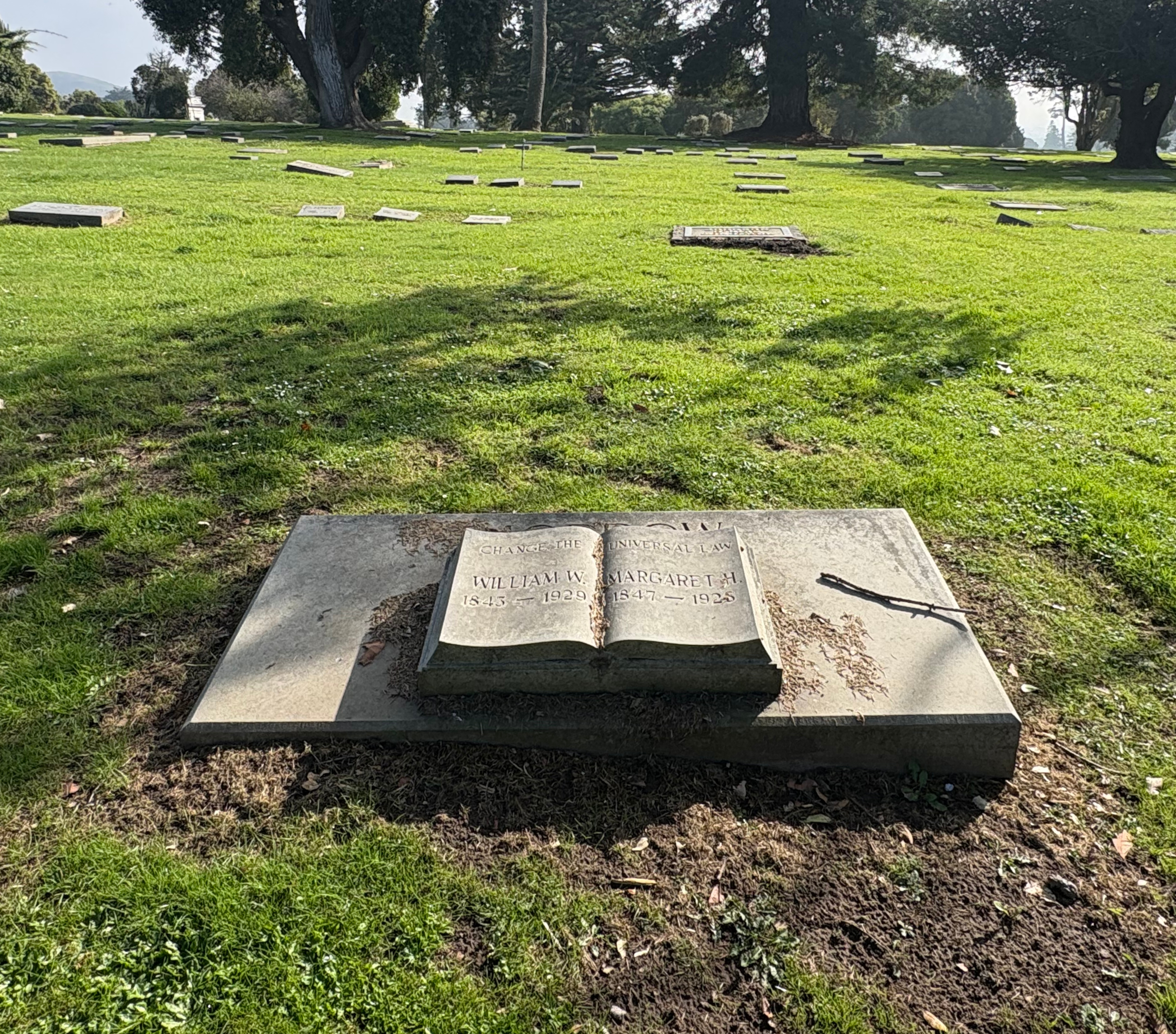
Morrow's grave at Cypress Lawn Memorial Park

Morrow was nominated by President William McKinley on May 18, 1897, to a joint seat on the United States Court of Appeals for the Ninth Circuit and the United States Circuit Courts for the Ninth Circuit vacated by Judge Joseph McKenna. He was confirmed by the Senate on May 20, 1897, and received his commission the same day. On December 31, 1911, the Circuit Courts were abolished and he thereafter served only on the Court of Appeals. He assumed senior status on January 1, 1923. His service terminated on July 24, 1929, due to his death in San Francisco, San Francisco County, where he resided. He was the last appeals court judge who continued to serve in active service appointed by President McKinley. He was interred in Cypress Lawn Cemetery in Colma, California.

=== Precedent setting case ===
While serving on the district court, Morrow ruled in the case of In re Wong Kim Ark that Chinese children born in the United States were automatically United States citizens.

== Other service ==
Morrow was one of the incorporators of the American Red Cross.

== Personal life ==
Morrow's mother, Margaret Tilley Morrow (1805–1864), was, according to her obituary, widowed twice. Her second husband, Morrow's father, was an Irishman who died only eight years after they were married.

Morrow married Margaret Hulbert (October 1, 1847 – August 26, 1926), a native of Iowa, on June 18, 1865, in Sonoma, California. Together they had four children:

1. William Hulbert Morrow (1868–1930); married Katherine Dillon Hinkle (1870–1955) and had one daughter, Arabelle Morrow Mann (1893–1963).
2. Maurice Morrow (1869–1870)
3. Maud Morrow (1873–1926); married on October 13, 1893, to then Lieutenant (later Rear Admiral) Augustus F. Fechteler, who served during the Spanish-American War, Philippine-American War, and World War I in the United States Navy.
4. Eleanor Morrow (1879–1958); married Henry Latrobe Roosevelt (1879–1936) on January 15, 1902. He served as a United States Assistant Secretary of the Navy from 1933 to 1936.

== Electoral history ==
Robert Ferral, Morrow's Democratic Party opponent in the 1888 election

1884 United States House of Representatives elections
Party	Candidate	Votes	%
Republican	William W. Morrow	15,083	58.8
Democratic	R. P. Hastings	10,422	40.6
Populist	H. S. Fitch	123	0.5
Prohibition	George Babcock	15	0.1
Total votes		25,643	100.0
Turnout			
Republican gain from Democratic			

1886 United States House of Representatives elections
Party	Candidate	Votes	%
Republican	William W. Morrow (Incumbent)	11,413	48.6
Democratic	Frank McCoppin	9,854	42.0
Independent	Charles Allen Sumner	2,104	9.0
Prohibition	Robert Thompson	84	0.4
Total votes		23,455	100.0
Turnout			
Republican hold			

1888 United States House of Representatives elections
Party	Candidate	Votes	%
Republican	William W. Morrow (Incumbent)	14,217	50.8
Democratic	Robert Ferral	13,624	48.6
American Party	Frank M. Pixley	173	0.6
Total votes		28,014	100.0
Turnout			
Republican hold			

== Sources ==
- United States Congress. "William W. Morrow (id: M001006)". Biographical Directory of the United States Congress.
- "Morrow, William W. – Federal Judicial Center". www.fjc.gov.

U.S. House of Representatives
Preceded by Pleasant B. Tully	Member of the U.S. House of Representatives from California's 4th congressional district 1885–1891	Succeeded by John T. Cutting
Legal offices
Preceded by Ogden Hoffman Jr.	Judge of the United States District Court for the Northern District of California; 1891–1897	Succeeded by John J. De Haven
Preceded by Joseph McKenna	Judge of the United States Circuit Courts for the Ninth Circuit; 1897–1911	Succeeded by Seat abolished
Preceded by Joseph McKenna	Judge of the United States Court of Appeals for the Ninth Circuit; 1897–1923	Succeeded by Frank H. Rudkin
