= USS Fechteler =

USS Fechteler has been the name of more than one United States Navy ship, and may refer to:

- USS Fechteler (DE-157), a destroyer escort launched in 1943 and sunk in battle in 1944
- USS Fechteler (DD-870), a destroyer launched in 1945 and decommissioned in 1970
