= USS Ganadoga =

Tugboat of the United States Navy

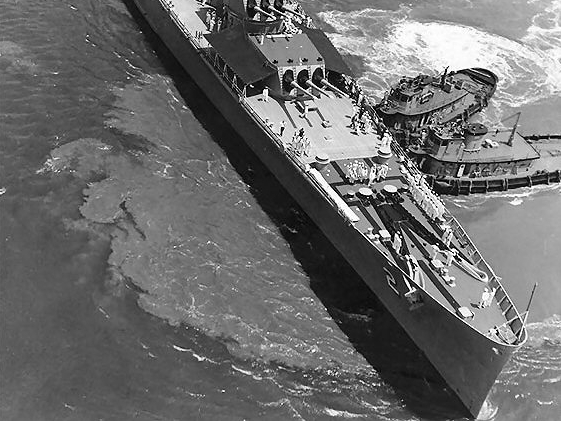
- USS Segwarusa (YTM-365) and USS Ganadoga (YTM-390) Help USS Canberra (CAG-2) move into position for the International Naval Review, in Hampton Roads, VA, 12 June 1957.

History

United States
- Name: USS Ganadoga (YTM-390)
- Builder: Consolidated Shipbuilding Corporation, Morris Heights, New York
- Laid down: 2 August 1944
- Launched: 9 November 1944
- Acquired: December 1944
- In service: 15 December 1944
- Reclassified: Harbor Tug, Large YTB-390, 15 May 1944; District Harbor Tug, Medium YTM-390 1 February 1962
- Stricken: Unknown
- Fate: Disposed of in support of fleet exercises, 1 August 1980

General characteristics
- Class & type: Sassaba-class harbor tug
- Displacement: 260 tons; 345 tons (full)
- Length: 100 ft 0 in (30.48 m)
- Beam: 25 ft 0 in (7.62 m)
- Draft: 9 ft 7 in (2.92 m) (full)
- Speed: 12 knots (22 km/h; 14 mph)
- Complement: 14
- Armament: 2 x 0.5 in (12.7 mm) machine guns

Ganadoga, originally designated YT-390, was reclassified YTB-390 on 15 May 1944; laid down 2 August 1944 by Consolidated Shipbuilding Corp., Morris Heights, N.Y.; launched 9 September 1944; and placed in service 15 December 1944.

Ganadoga was assigned to 5th Naval District, Norfolk, and performed miscellaneous harbor operations for the next 18 years. She was reclassified YTM-390 on 1 February 1962, and in December of that year she was transferred to the 6th Naval District at Charleston, SC. In 1980 she was expended as a target in support of fleet exercises.
