= USS Paducah (PG-18) =

Gunboat of the United States Navy

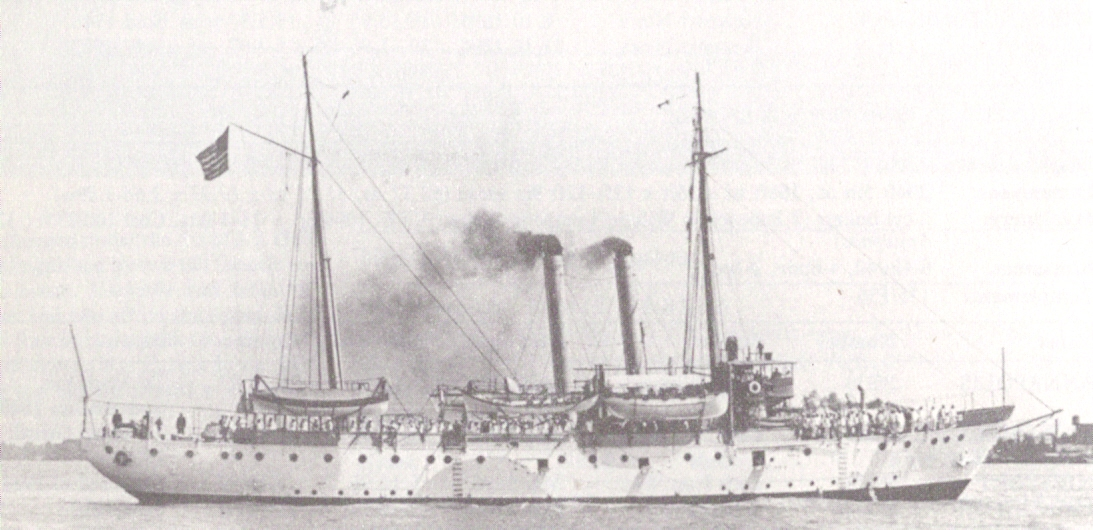
- USS Paducah (PG-18) gun ship

History

United States
- Name: Paducah
- Namesake: City of Paducah, Kentucky
- Builder: Gas Engine and Power Co. and Charles L. Seabury Co., Morris Heights, New York
- Laid down: 22 September 1903
- Launched: 11 October 1904
- Commissioned: 2 September 1905
- Decommissioned: 2 March 1919
- In service: 2 May 1922
- Out of service: 7 September 1945
- Renamed: Geula
- Stricken: 19 December 1946
- Identification: Hull symbol: PG-18
- Fate: Scrapped

General characteristics
- Class & type: Dubuque-class gunboat
- Displacement: 1,237 tons
- Length: 200 ft (61 m)
- Beam: 35 ft (11 m)
- Draft: 12 ft (3.7 m)
- Propulsion: 2 × 500ihp Gas Engine Power Co. vertical triple-expansion engines; 2 × 623.5ihp vertical triple-expansion engines (1921)
- Speed: 12 knots (22 km/h; 14 mph); 12.85 knots (23.80 km/h; 14.79 mph) (1921)
- Complement: 162; 161 (1921)
- Armament: 1905-; 6 × 4 in (100 mm)/40 cal rapid-fire guns; 4 × 6-pounder (57 mm (2.2 in)) rapid-fire guns; 2 × 1-pounder (37 mm (1.5 in)) rapid-fire guns; 1 × .30 cal Colt machine gun; 1911-; 6 × 4 in (100 mm)/50 cal rapid-fire guns; 4 × 6-pounder (57 mm (2.2 in)) rapid-fire guns; 2 × 1-pounder (37 mm (1.5 in)) rapid-fire guns; 1918-; 4 × 4 in (100 mm)/50 cal rapid-fire guns; 4 × 6-pounder (57 mm (2.2 in)) rapid-fire guns; 1921-; 4 × 4 in (100 mm)/50 cal rapid-fire guns; 1 × 3 in (76 mm)/23 cal anti-aircraft gun; 1940-; 1 × 5 in (130 mm)/38 cal DP guns; 2 × 4 in (100 mm)/50 cal guns; 1 × 3 in (76 mm)/50 cal DP guns anti-aircraft gun

USS Paducah (PG-18) was a Dubuque-class gunboat acquired by the US Navy prior to World War I. Her task was to patrol, escort, and protect Navy ships.

== Construction ==
Paducah (Gunboat No. 18/PG-18) was launched 11 October 1904, by Gas Engine and Power Co. and Charles L. Seabury Co., Morris Heights, New York; sponsored by Miss Anna May Yeiser; and commissioned 2 September 1905. She was reclassified AG–7 in 1919; IX–23, 24 April 1922; and PG–18, 4 November 1940.

== Service history ==
After shakedown, Paducah joined the Caribbean Squadron early in 1906 to protect American lives and interests through patrols and port calls to Caribbean and Central American and South American cities. She patrolled Mexican waters in the aftermath of the Vera Cruz incident through the summer of 1914, then returned to her Caribbean operations, performing surveys from time to time.

Paducah was ordered north to prepare at Portsmouth, New Hampshire, for European service in World War I, for which she sailed from New York 29 September 1917. She reached Gibraltar 27 October, and based there as convoy escort to North Africa, Italy, the Azores, and Madeira. She attacked a U-boat 9 September 1918 after it had sunk one of her convoy, and was credited with possibly damaging the submarine. Leaving Gibraltar 11 December, Paducah reached Portsmouth, New Hampshire, 7 January 1919 to decommission 2 March 1919.

She again recommissioned 16 August 1920 through 9 September 1921 for survey duty in the Caribbean. Paducah was commissioned a third time 2 May 1922 for duty training Naval Reservists in the 9th Naval District. She arrived Duluth, Minnesota, 20 June, replacing the USS Essex which then became a receiving ship. These training missions included regular two-week cruises, and gunnery practice on Lake Michigan. In addition to regular duties, the ship was used for miscellaneous ceremonial purposes, assisted in the fight against a fire on Isle Royale, and assisted with rescue work when the Mississippi River flooded.

Paducah was modified in the early 1930s to run on oil-fired boilers. The triple expansion engines were installed, with boilers fore and aft. Additional modifications included hammock berthing on a new boat deck, and a sheltered main deck between the quarterdeck and the pilot house.

Paducah returned to the East Coast of the United States in early 1941, and through World War II, trained Naval Armed Guard gunners in Chesapeake Bay, thus giving vital service to the Merchant Marine's crucial World War II assignment. Decommissioning 7 September 1945, the Paducah was transferred to the Maritime Commission 19 December 1946, and was sold the same day to Maria Angelo, Miami, Florida.

== Refugee Ship ==
After she was sold in Miami, the ship was purchased for Aliyah Bet, through the Weston Trading Company and would be renamed the Geula, meaning "Redemption". A volunteer American crew sailed her to Bayonne, France, where she was outfitted with bunks, to accommodate the refugees that would later board the ship. On this voyage, the Aliyah Bet had devised a response to the new British policy of sending refugees back to their countries of origin. During the voyage, the Aliyah Bet had reached an agreement with Russia, to allow Jewish refugees to embark for Palestine, from Soviet-controlled Eastern Europe, off a coast in the Black Sea. It was understood that the Russians would refuse to accept the return of the refugees.

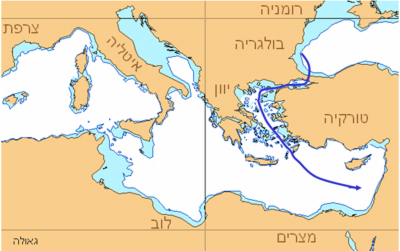

Thus, the Geula set sail for the Black Sea on August 4, on a voyage that circled Portugal and Spain, through the Strait of Gibraltar towards the Aegean Sea. At this point, a British aircraft sighted the Paducah, after which British warships began to follow her. At the entrance to Dardanelles Strait, the Geula took on a local guide and the British did not follow through the strait. The Paducah eventually docked at Burgas, Bulgaria where she took on1,388 Jewish refugees and set sail for Palestine on September 26. As she entered the Mediterranean Sea, she was once again followed by British warships. At this point, she took on her Hebrew name, the Geula. Eventually, on October 2, the British intercepted the Geula, towed her to Haifa and the refugees were sent to an internment camp in Cyprus. The hired non-Jewish captain joined his passengers for the trip to the internment camp under the fictitious name Mendel Levy.

The Geula was tied up in Haifa along with other captured immigrant ships. After the State of Israel achieved independence, the newly formed Israeli Navy examined her for possible service, yet she was not in good shape and not accepted for service. She was outfitted for service as an Israeli merchant ship and sailed on one trip from Haifa to Naples, Italy. There she was docked and sold for scrap in 1951.

== Commanders ==
- CDR Albert Gustavus Winterhalter, USN - USNA Class of 1873 (2 September 1905 – 21 September 1906)
- LT John Wills Greenslade, USN - USNA Class of 1899 (21 September 1906 – 29 December 1908)
- CDR John Lewis Purcell, USN (29 December 1908 – 11 January 1910)
- CDR William Wirt Gilmer, USN - USNA Class of 1895 (11 January 1910 – 16 May 1910)
- CDR George Grant Mitchell, USN (16 May 1910 – 8 March 1916)
- LCDR Edward Constant Southworth Parker, USN 8 March 1916 – 18 July 1917)
- LT Frank Caspar Fechteler, USN (18 July 1917 – 2 March 1919)
- LCDR John Treadwell Bowers, USN - USNA Class of 1899 (16 August 1920 – 9 September 1921)
- LCDR Joseph Carhart, Jr., USNRF (1929 - 1931)
- CDR Antoine Oliver Rabideau, USNRF (1931 - 6 July 1942)
- CDR Francis David Hurd, USNR (6 July 1942 - August 1944)
- LCDR Robert Edward Seltzer, USNR (August 1944 - 7 September 1945)

== Awards ==
- Cuban Pacification Medal
- Mexican Service Medal
- World War I Victory Medal
- American Defense Service Medal
- American Campaign Medal
- World War II Victory Medal
