= USS Segwarusa =

Tugboat of the United States Navy

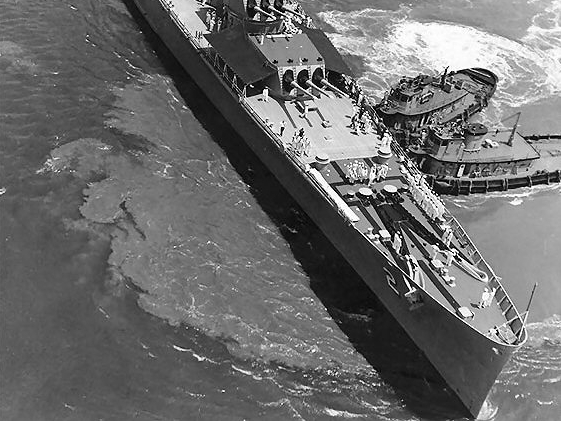
- USS Segwarusa (YTM-365) and USS Ganadoga (YTM-390) Help USS Canberra (CAG-2) move into position for the International Naval Review, in Hampton Roads, VA, 12 June 1957.

History

United States
- Name: USS Segwarusa (YTM-365)
- Builder: Consolidated Shipbuilding Corporation, Morris Heights, New York
- Laid down: 6 March 1944
- Launched: 22 April 1944
- In service: 25 September 1944
- Reclassified: Harbor Tug (Large), YTB-365, 15 May 1944; District Harbor Tug, Medium YTM-365, 24 November 1961
- Stricken: 1 January 1974
- Fate: Sold for scrapping in 1974 to Marine Power & Equipment Co, Seattle, WA, 25 June 1974

General characteristics
- Class & type: Sassaba-class harbor tug
- Displacement: 260 tons; 345 tons (full)
- Length: 100 ft 0 in (30.48 m)
- Beam: 25 ft 0 in (7.62 m)
- Draft: 9 ft 7 in (2.92 m) (full)
- Speed: 12 knots (22 km/h; 14 mph)
- Complement: 14

Segwarusa (YT-365) was laid down on 6 March 1944 by Consolidated Shipbuilding Corp., Morris Heights, N.Y.; launched on 22 April; delivered to the Navy and placed in service on 25 September 1944.

Segwarusa was allocated to the 5th Naval District and based at Norfolk, Virginia. She was reclassified as YTB-365 on 15 May 1944 and as YTM-365 on 24 November 1961. She provided fire-fighting, tug, and salvage services to ships and installations in the Norfolk area throughout her long career. Segwarusa was struck from the Navy list on 1 January 1974, sold for scrap to Marine Power & Equip. Co., Seattle, Washington, and removed from Navy custody on 25 June 1974.
