= USS Laning =

Buckley-class destroyer escort

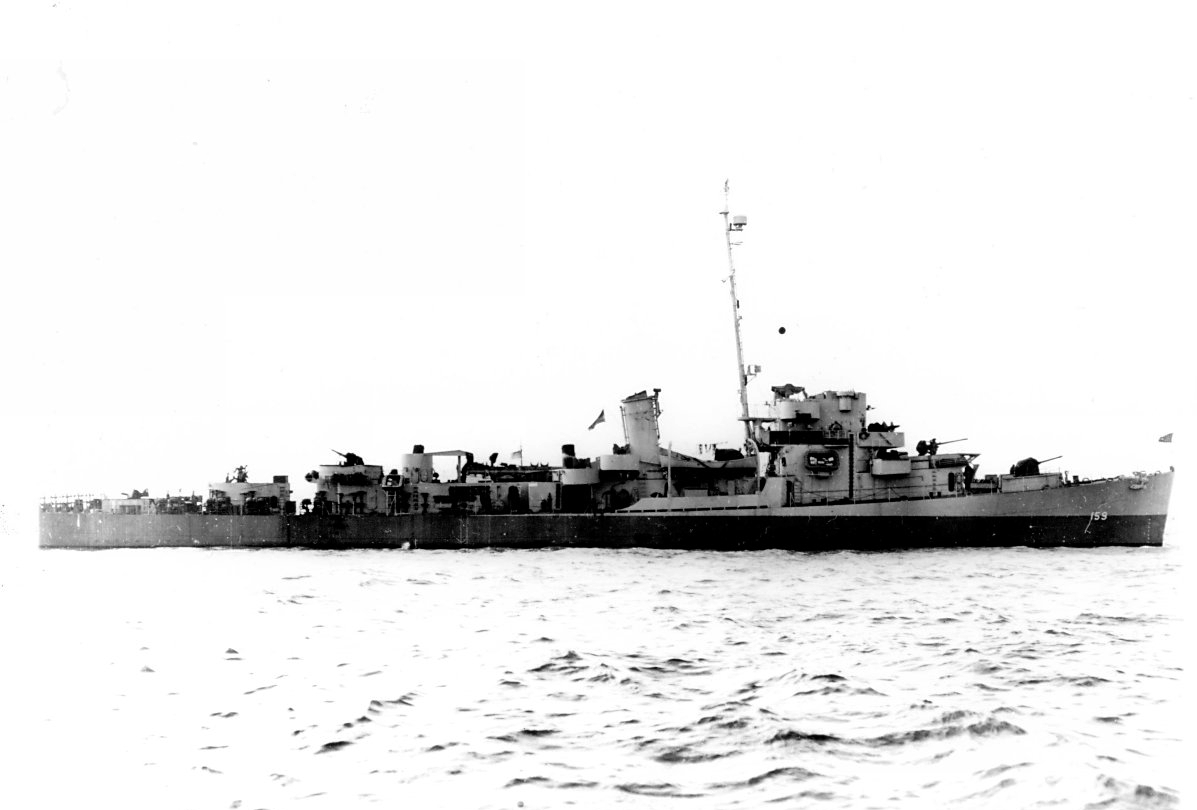
- USS Laning (DE-159) on 10 March 1944

History

United States
- Name: USS Laning
- Namesake: Admiral Harris Laning
- Builder: Norfolk Navy Yard, Portsmouth, Virginia
- Laid down: 23 April 1943
- Launched: 4 July 1943
- Sponsored by: Mrs. Mabel C. Laning, widow of Rear Admiral Laning
- Commissioned: 1 August 1943, at Norfolk, Virginia
- Decommissioned: 28 June 1946, at Green Cove Springs, Florida
- Recommissioned: 6 April 1951, at Green Cove Springs
- Decommissioned: 13 September 1957
- Reclassified: LPR-55, 1 January 1969
- Stricken: 1 March 1975
- Honors and awards: 1 battle star (World War II)
- Fate: Sold for scrapping, 30 September 1975

General characteristics
- Class & type: Buckley-class destroyer escort
- Displacement: 1,400 long tons (1,422 t) light; 1,673 long tons (1,700 t) standard
- Length: 306 ft (93 m) o/a; 300 ft (91 m) w/l
- Beam: 36 ft 10 in (11.23 m)
- Draft: 9 ft 5 in (2.87 m); 13 ft 6 in (4.11 m) maximum
- Propulsion: 2 × "D" Express boilers; General Electric turbo-electric drive; 12,000 shp (8.9 MW); 2 screws
- Complement: 186 officers and enlisted
- Armament: 3 × single Mk22 3 in (76 mm) caliber guns; 1 × quad Mk2 1.1"/75 caliber gun caliber gun; 8 × single Mk4 AA Oerlikon 20 mm guns; 1 × triple 21-inch (533 mm) Mk15 torpedo tubes; 1 × Hedgehog Mk10 anti-submarine mortar (144 rounds); 8 × K-gun Mk6 depth charge projectors; 2 × Mk9 depth charge tracks

USS Laning (DE-159/APD-55) was a Buckley-class destroyer escort in service with the United States Navy from 1943 to 1946 and from 1951 to 1957. She was scrapped in 1975.

== Construction ==
USS Laning (DE-159) was laid down on 23 April 1943 by Norfolk Navy Yard, Norfolk, Virginia; launched on 4 July 1943; sponsored by Mrs. Mabel C. Laning, widow of Rear Admiral Harris Laning; and commissioned on 1 August 1943 at Norfolk.

== World War II service ==
=== Atlantic Ocean operations ===
After shakedown off Bermuda, Laning trained destroyer escort crews out of Norfolk before joining CortDiv 21 at New York City on 9 November for convoy escort duty. She steamed to Aruba, Netherlands West Indies 12 to 17 November and departed for North Africa on 20 November escorting high-speed tankers. During the next three months she made two escort runs between Aruba and Bizerte, Tunisia, and Algiers, Algeria.

Following training off the New England coast, Laning arrived Norfolk on 1 April 1944 to resume escort duty for transport and supply convoys. From 3 April to 8 October she made three Atlantic-Mediterranean cruises between Norfolk and Bizerte and back to New York City. While steaming from Algiers to Bizerte on 20 April, she fought off five enemy Junkers Ju 88 medium bombers in a night attack, during which an aerial torpedo passed close aboard her starboard side.

=== Convoy attacked by U-boats ===
Departing Tunisia on 1 May, Laning joined the westbound convoy GUS-38. Two days later she assumed a forward screening station after Menges (DE-320) was damaged by an acoustic torpedo, fired by U-371. She maintained station while Allied ships hunted for and sank the U-boat on 4 May in the Gulf of Bougie.

During mid-watch on 5 May her radar detected a surface contact and tracked from a range of 13 to 3 miles. As she closed the contact and prepared to challenge the target, U-967, the submarine submerged at a range of 6,000 yards (5,500 m) and headed for the convoy. Assisted by three other escorts, Laning sought to intercept and destroy the U-boat before she could fire on the convoy. Violent underwater explosions at 0310 and 0345 jarred the searching escorts; and, shortly after the latter explosion, Fechteler (DE-157) was torpedoed in the engine room.

While an unsuccessful search for U-967 (scuttled 19 August at Toulon, France) continued, Laning closed the stricken escort at 0410 and began to rescue survivors, Fechteler broke apart and, during another violent explosion at 0530, sank. Laning completed rescue operations at 0621 and transported 125 survivors to Gibraltar before rejoining the convoy that day.

=== Converted to an APD ===
After arriving New York on 8 October, Laning served as a practice torpedo target ship out of New London, Connecticut, from 15 October until 22 November when she steamed to Philadelphia, Pennsylvania. Redesignated APD-55 on 24 November, she completed conversion to a Charles Lawrence-class high speed transport on 14 February 1945, and steamed to Norfolk on 21 February to train high-speed transport crews.

=== Pacific Ocean operations ===
Departing Norfolk on 26 May, she sailed via San Diego, California, to Pearl Harbor, where she arrived on 18 June. After training with Underwater Demolition Teams (UDT), she returned to San Francisco, California, on 14 July for alteration to UDT flagship.

Laning proceeded to San Pedro, Los Angeles, 11 to 12 August, embarked UDT 9 and ComUDTRon 2, and departed Oceanside, California, on 16 August for the Far East. She reached Okinawa on 4 September, joined U.S. 7th Fleet occupation forces, and sailed the 5th for Korea. From 8 September until 17 October she supported UDT reconnaissance operations in the harbors of Jinsen, Korea, and Taku Bar and Qingdao, China, before returning to Okinawa on 20 October. Departing the 24th, she sailed via Guam, Eniwetok, and Pearl Harbor to San Pedro where she arrived on 15 November. Sailing for the U.S. East Coast on 31 January 1946, Laning reached Boston, Massachusetts, on 16 February and steamed to Green Cove Springs, Florida, 18 to 22 March. She decommissioned on 28 June and entered the Atlantic Fleet Reserve.

== Korean War service ==
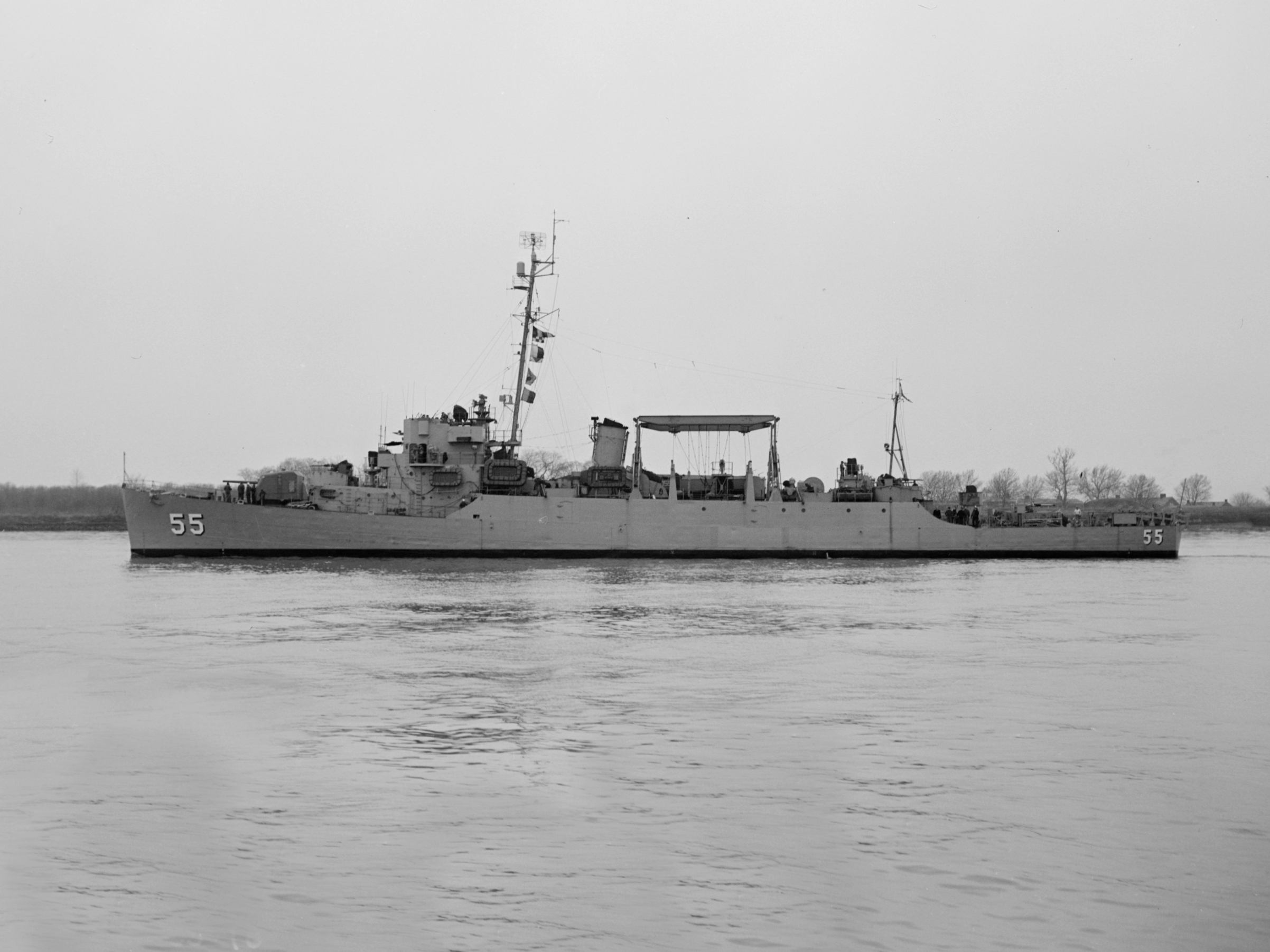
Laning on 12 December 1953.

After Communist aggression in Korea necessitated a buildup of American naval strength, Laning recommissioned on 6 April 1951 at Green Cove Springs. She steamed to Norfolk 11 to 14 May, and for more than three years she operated along the Atlantic coast from Labrador to the Caribbean. Departing Little Creek, Virginia, on 5 January 1955, she served at San Diego from 23 January to 11 April and returned to the east coast, arriving New York on 29 April.

Assigned to the 3rd Naval District, Laning served as a Naval Reserve training ship. During the next three years she made periodic training cruises that carried her out of New York City north to Quebec and the Maritime Provinces and south to the West Indies and the U.S. Gulf Coast. Returning to New York City from New England waters on 17 May 1957, she completed training cruise duty and transferred to Bayonne, New Jersey, on 2 August. Laning decommissioned on 13 September and entered the Atlantic Reserve Fleet, berthed at Norfolk. She was reclassified LPR-55 on 1 January 1969.

== Final decommissioning ==
Laning was struck from the Navy List on 1 March 1975 and sold for scrapping on 30 September 1975.
