= USS Whirlwind (SP-221) =

Patrol vessel of the United States Navy

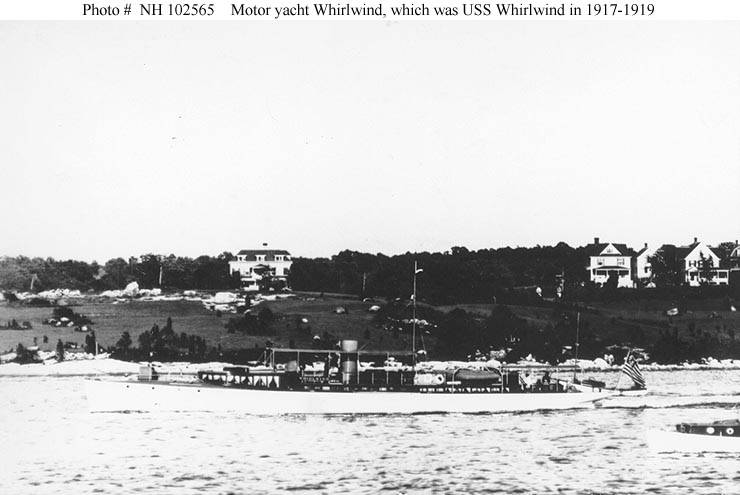
- Whirlwind in use as a civilian yacht sometime between 1909 and 1917, prior to her U.S. Navy service.

History

United States
- Name: USS Whirlwind
- Namesake: Previous name retained
- Builder: Charles L. Seabury Company and Gas Engine and Power Company, Morris Heights, the Bronx, New York
- Completed: 1909
- Acquired: 11 May 1917
- Commissioned: 26 June 1917
- Decommissioned: 8 December 1917
- Recommissioned: 29 September 1918
- Decommissioned: 3 December 1918
- Stricken: 24 April 1919
- Fate: Sold 30 June 1919
- Notes: Operated as civilian yacht Whirlwind 1909-1917

General characteristics
- Type: Patrol vessel
- Tonnage: 59 Gross register tons
- Length: Either 111 ft (34 m) or 117 ft (36 m)
- Beam: 12 ft (3.7 m)
- Draft: 3 ft 6 in (1.07 m) mean
- Propulsion: Steam engine, three shafts
- Speed: 20 knots
- Armament: 1 × 3-pounder gun; 1 × 1-pounder gun; 1 × machine gun

The first USS Whirlwind (SP-221) was a United States Navy patrol vessel in commission in 1917 and again in 1918.

== Construction, acquisition, and commissioning ==
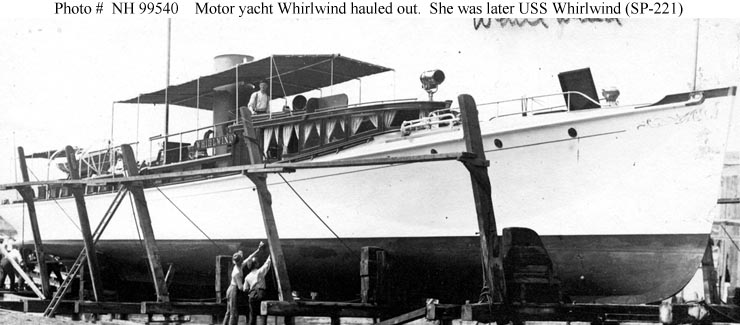
Whirlwind hauled out of the water while in civilian use sometime between 1909 and 1917, prior to her U.S. Navy service.

Whirlwind was built as a civilian wooden-hulled, triple-screw, steam yacht of the same name in 1909 by the Charles L. Seabury Company and the Gas Engine and Power Company at Morris Heights in the Bronx, New York. The U.S. Navy purchased her from her owner, Julius Fleischmann of New York City, on 11 May 1917 for World War I service as a patrol vessel. She was commissioned at the New York Navy Yard at Brooklyn, New York, as USS Whirlwind (SP-219) on 26 June 1917.

== World War I service ==
=== First period in commission, 1917 ===
Whirlwind fitted out at the Charles L. Seabury Company shipyard, then arrived at New Haven, Connecticut, on 17 August 1917. She soon commenced patrols off the Cornfield Point lightship. Her duties included hailing passing vessels and seeing that they kept within their designated channels and that other section patrol boats were on their stations. She also escorted Allied ships through the nets that guarded those waters. In the course of one of her normal cruises, she prevented the steamer SS Noreg, out of Nova Scotia, Canada, from fouling the antisubmarine net during a heavy squall on 24 August 1917. Early in September 1917 she inspected the 11th Division of the 3rd Naval District's local patrol forces on station in Long Island Sound.

By early September 1917, it had become apparent that Whirlwind's sea-keeping qualities left much to be desired. Her heavy rolling and pitching caused the Navy to cease using her as an offshore patrol vessel. She arrived at the Charles L. Seabury Company shipyard at Morris Heights on 13 September 1917 for overhaul, then was decommissioned at the Marine Basin at Brooklyn on 8 December 1917.

=== Second period in commission, 1918 ===
Reconsidered for naval use in a different nautical environment, Whirlwind was recommissioned at Waukegan, Illinois, on 29 September 1918. Operating out of Naval Training Station Great Lakes at Great Lakes, Illinois, she cruised to Waukegan and Chicago, Illinois, and to Milwaukee and Manitowoc, Wisconsin, before proceeding to Detroit, Michigan. During this time, she made three cruises on Lake Michigan with family members of Naval Training Station Great Lakes commandant Captain William A. Moffett—a Medal of Honor recipient, future rear admiral, and future Chief of the Navy's Bureau of Aeronautics—embarked.

== Final disposition ==
After her arrival at detroit, Whirlwind was decommissioned there on 3 December 1918. She was stricken from the Navy List on 24 April 1919 and sold on 30 June 1919.
