= William Fechteler =

American admiral (1896–1967)

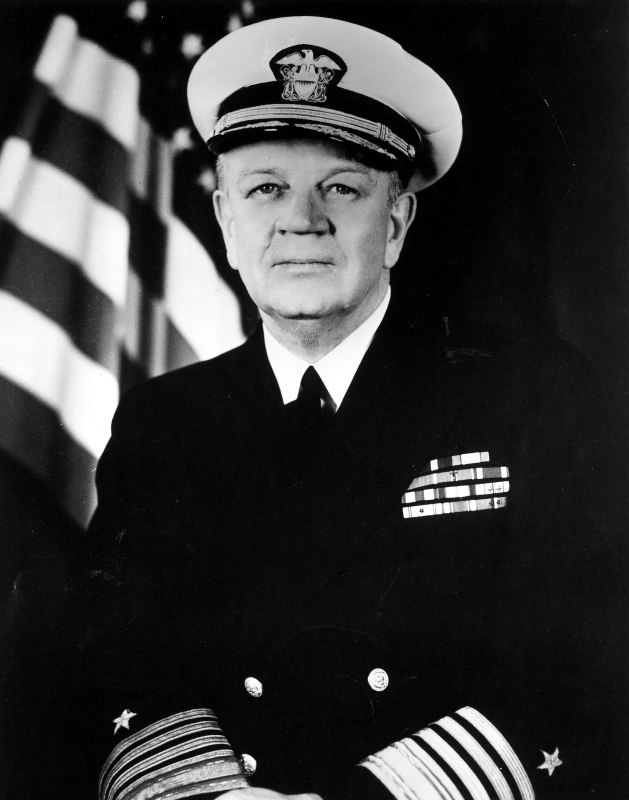
- Admiral William Fechteler, USN
- Born: March 6, 1896; San Rafael, California, U.S.
- Died: July 4, 1967 (aged 71); Bethesda Naval Hospital, Bethesda, Maryland, U.S.
- Burial place: Arlington National Cemetery
- Relatives: Rear Admiral Augustus F. Fechteler (father)
- Military career
- Branch: United States Navy
- Service years: 1916–1956
- Rank: Admiral
- Commands: Allied Forces Southern Europe; Chief of Naval Operations; United States Atlantic Command; United States Atlantic Fleet; Amphibious Group 8, Seventh Fleet; USS Indiana; USS Perry
- Conflicts: World War I World War II; Korean War
- Awards: Navy Distinguished Service Medal (2); Army Distinguished Service Medal; Legion of Merit; Bronze Star Medal

William Morrow Fechteler (March 6, 1896 – July 4, 1967) was an admiral in the United States Navy who served as Chief of Naval Operations during the Eisenhower administration.

== Biography ==
Fechteler was born in San Rafael, California, on March 6, 1896, the son of Rear Admiral Augustus F. Fechteler. He graduated from the United States Naval Academy with the class of 1916 and served in the battleship USS Pennsylvania during World War I. Over the following two decades, Fechteler had a variety of seagoing and shore billets, including several staff positions and command of the destroyer USS Perry.

In 1942–43, Captain Fechteler served in the Bureau of Navigation (later Bureau of Naval Personnel), then commanded the battleship USS Indiana in the Pacific. Promoted to the rank of rear admiral in early 1944, he was Commander of the Seventh Fleet's Amphibious Group 8 from August 1944 to March 1945, participating in landings at Morotai, Leyte, Lingayen and elsewhere in the Philippines. He spent the rest of 1945 as Assistant Chief of Naval Personnel, in Washington, D.C., followed by service as Commander, Battleships & Cruisers, Atlantic Fleet. As a vice admiral, he was Deputy Chief of Naval Operations, Personnel, from February 1947 until January 1950 and, as an admiral (February 1, 1950), was Commander in Chief, Atlantic and United States Atlantic Fleet in February 1950 – August 1951.

In August 1951, Admiral Fechteler was appointed Chief of Naval Operations (CNO), succeeding Admiral Forrest P. Sherman, who had died in office in July. As CNO, Fechteler was responsible for sustaining Korean War-era naval activities in the Far East and in the European area. He made two trips across the Atlantic in 1951–52 and one to Asia. He continued the Navy's building program for new aircraft carriers in the face of economy moves and to expand pay and benefits for the Navy's people.

When President Dwight D. Eisenhower took office in 1953, he chose to replace all the Armed Forces' chiefs. In August 1953, Admiral Fechteler exchanged positions with the new CNO, Admiral Robert B. Carney, becoming Commander in Chief, Allied Forces, Southern Europe. He served at that command's Naples headquarters until July 1956, when he retired. Over the next several years, Fechteler served on a special Defense Department study committee on personnel compensation and worked for the General Electric Company.

Fechteler died at Bethesda Naval Hospital in Bethesda, Maryland on July 4, 1967, at the age of 71. He is buried at Arlington National Cemetery.

== Namesakes ==
USS Fechteler (DE-157) and USS Fechteler (DD-870) were named for his father, Rear Admiral Augustus F. Fechteler.

== Decorations ==
Admiral William M. Fechteler's ribbon bar:

1st Row	Navy Distinguished Service Medal w/ Gold Star		
2nd Row	Army Distinguished Service Medal	Legion of Merit	Bronze Star Medal with "V" Device
3rd Row	Navy Commendation Ribbon	Navy Expeditionary Medal	World War I Victory Medal with "Atlantic Fleet" Clasp
4th Row	American Defense Service Medal with "Fleet" clasp	American Campaign Medal	Asiatic-Pacific Campaign Medal with nine battle stars
5th Row	World War II Victory Medal	National Defense Service Medal	Philippine Liberation Medal with two stars

Military offices
Preceded by Forrest P. Sherman	Chief of Naval Operations; 1951–1953	Succeeded by Robert B. Carney
