= Fechter =

Fechter may refer to:

- Aaron Fechter, American engineer and inventor
- Charles Albert Fechter (1822–1879), French-British actor
- Johann Jacob Fechter (1717–1797), Swiss engineer, master builder and geodesist
- Hans Fechter (1885–1955), German admiral, younger brother of Paul Fechter
- Paul Fechter (1880–1958), German theatre critic, editor and a writer
- Peter Fechter (1944–1962), German bricklayer, one of the first victims of the Berlin Wall's border guards
- Steven Fechter, playwright and an award-winning screenwriter
- Werner Fechter (1910–1994), German Germanist

== See also ==
- Fechter's Finger Flinging Frolic, Magic conventions
- 2533 Fechtig
- Fechteler (disambiguation)
- Fechner
