= Pleasant B. Tully =

American politician (1829–1897)

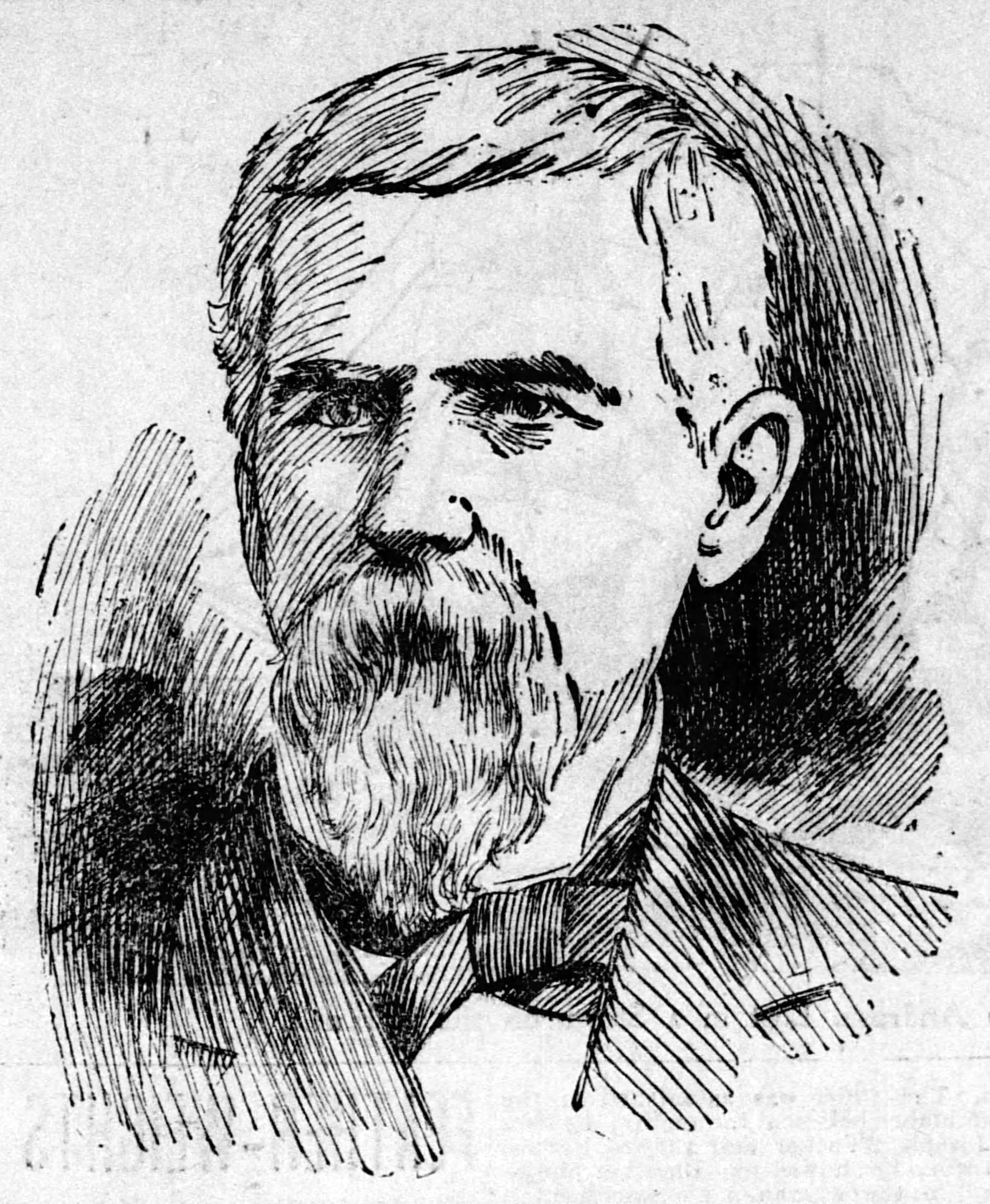
- Tully c. 1891

Member of the U.S. House of Representatives from California's 4th district
- In office March 4, 1883 – March 3, 1885
- Preceded by: Romualdo Pacheco
- Succeeded by: William W. Morrow

Delegate to the Second Constitutional Convention of California
- In office September 28, 1878 – March 3, 1879
- Preceded by: Office established
- Succeeded by: Office abolished
- Constituency: 4th congressional district

Personal details
- Born: Pleasant Britton Tully; March 21, 1829 Henderson County, Tennessee, U.S.
- Died: March 24, 1897 (aged 68) Gilroy, California, U.S.
- Resting place: Masonic Ceremony, Gilroy, California, U.S.
- Party: Democratic
- Spouse: Mary Elizabeth Martin (m. 1859)
- Children: 2
- Education: Reell's Academy
- Occupation: Politician, lawyer

Pleasant Britton Tully (March 21, 1829 – March 24, 1897) was an American politician and lawyer who served a single term in the United States House of Representatives, representing the 4th congressional district of California from 1883 to 1885 as a Democrat in the 48th United States Congress.

== Early life and education ==
Tully was born in Henderson County, Tennessee, on March 21, 1829. When he was nine years old, Tully moved to Arkansas with his father, who settled in Phillips County in 1838. Tully attended public and private schools, graduating from Reell's Academy in 1849.

At the age of 21, Tully briefly moved to Texas, though returned to Arkansas, where he engaged in mercantile pursuits. He returned to Texas in 1853 before moving to California that same year, where he engaged in mining.

Tilly settled in Gilroy, California, on May 2, 1858. He studied law.

== Career ==
Tully was admitted to the bar in 1863, after which he commenced practice. He served as delegate at large to California's constitutional convention in 1879.

=== Congress ===
In 1882, Tully was elected to a single term in the United States House of Representatives, defeating Republican nominee George L. Woods by more than 3,600 votes. He represented the 4th congressional district of California from 1883 to 1885 as a Democrat in the 48th United States Congress.

Tully's time in office began on March 4, 1883, and concluded on March 3, 1885. He was not a candidate for re-election in 1884.

=== Later career ===
Following his tenure in Congress, Tully resumed practicing law.

== Personal life and death ==
Tully married Mary Elizabeth Martin on September 25, 1859. They had two children together.

Tully died at the age of 68 at his home in Gilroy, California, on March 24, 1897. He was interred in the Masonic Cemetery, located in Gilroy.

== Electoral history ==
1882 United States House of Representatives elections
Party	Candidate	Votes	%
Democratic	Pleasant B. Tully	23,105	54.4
Republican	George Lemuel Woods	18,387	43.3
Populist	M. V. Wright	650	1.5
Prohibition	Isaac Kinley	355	0.8
Total votes		42,497	100.0
Turnout			
Democratic gain from Republican			

== See also ==
- List of United States representatives who served a single term

U.S. House of Representatives
Preceded by Romualdo Pacheco	Member of the U.S. House of Representatives from California's 4th congressional district 1883–1885	Succeeded by William W. Morrow
