= USS Fechteler (DD-870) =

Gearing-class destroyer

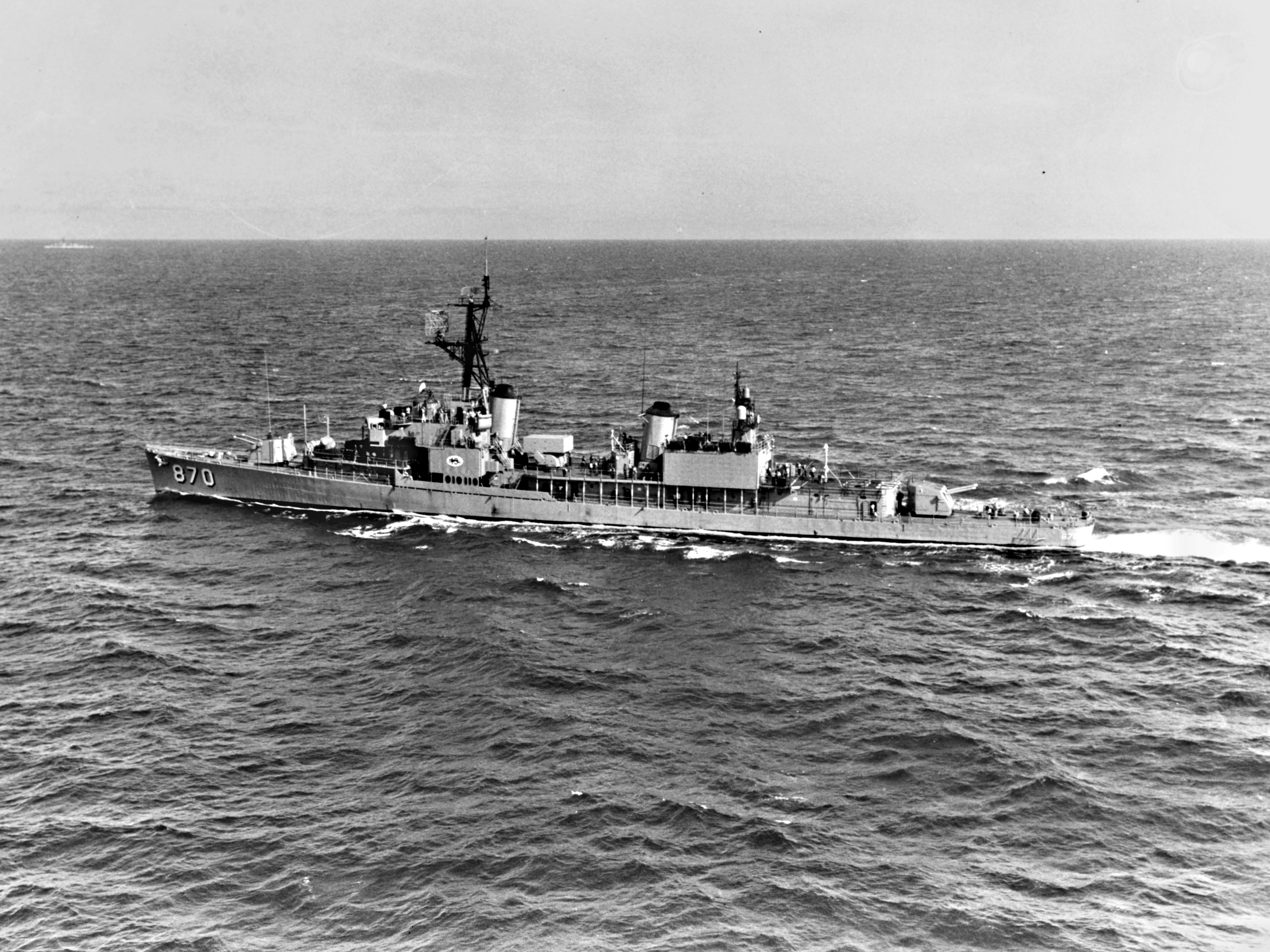
- USS Fechteler in June 1964

History

United States
- Name: USS Fechteler
- Builder: Bethlehem Mariners Harbor, Staten Island
- Laid down: 12 April 1945
- Launched: 19 September 1945
- Commissioned: 2 March 1946
- Decommissioned: 11 September 1970
- Stricken: 11 September 1970
- Identification: Callsign: NBHA; Hull number: DD-870
- Fate: Scrapped 28 June 1972

General characteristics
- Class & type: Gearing-class destroyer
- Displacement: 3460 Tons (Full)
- Speed: 36.8 Knots,
- Range: 4500 NM

USS Fechteler (DD-870), named for Rear Admiral Augustus Francis Fechteler USN (1857–1921) and his son Lieutenant Frank Casper Fechteler (1897–1922), was a Gearing-class destroyer laid down by the Bethlehem Steel Corporation at Staten Island in New York on 12 April 1945, launched on 19 September 1945 by Miss Joan S. Fechteler, granddaughter of Rear Admiral Fechteler and niece of Lieutenant Fechteler, (she was also the sponsor of the first USS Fechteler (DE-157)) and commissioned on 2 March 1946.

Fechteler operated with the Seventh Fleet in support of United Nations Forces during the Korean War, underwent conversion to a radar picket destroyer from 1 April to 1 December 1953, alternated operations along the west coast and in Hawaiian waters with deployments to the western Pacific with the Seventh Fleet, and participated in Sea Dragon and Market Time operations, patrolled on search and rescue duties and carried out naval gunfire support missions during the Vietnam War.

Fechteler was decommissioned and stricken from the Naval Vessel Register on 11 September 1970 and sold for scrap on 28 June 1972.

== Service history ==
=== Before the Korean War ===
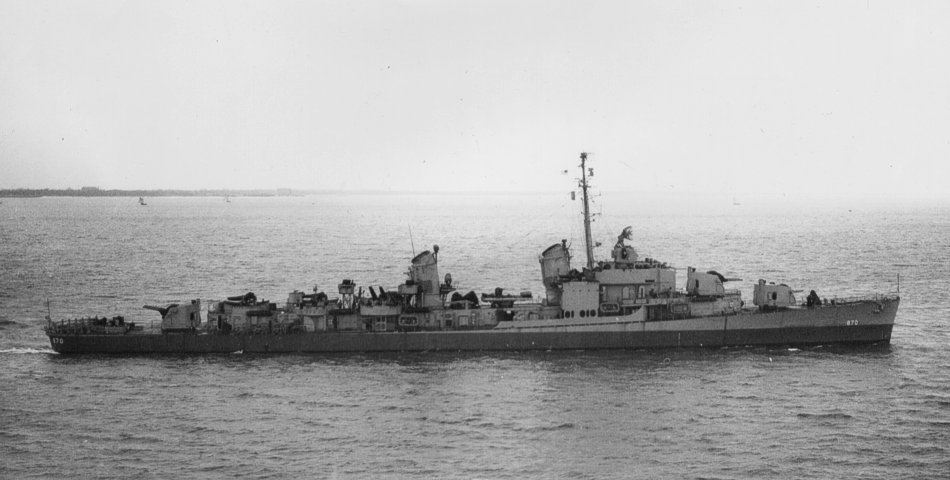
USS Fechteler in April 1946.

Her home port was Norfolk, Virginia. Fechteler operated with carriers in the Virginia Capes area, and made a brief winter cruise to Argentia, Newfoundland. On 6 January 1947 she sailed from Norfolk for the west coast, and on 26 May sailed from San Diego for her first tour of duty in the Far East. Serving in the occupation, she called at several Chinese ports, as well as at Okinawa, Hong Kong, Yokosuka, and Guam. She returned to San Diego 22 January 1948, to resume west coast training operations.

=== Korean War ===
Fechteler completed a second tour of duty in the Far East in 1949, and in June 1950, when the Korean War broke out, was at sea off San Francisco on exercises. At once she sailed for Pearl Harbor, where she stood by in preparation for the possible spreading of the conflict, and on 14 July returned to San Diego to prepare for Korean service. She served in the Far East on two war-time deployments, the first from 13 November 1950 to 8 August 1951, the second from 23 February 1952 to 29 September 1952. During both of these, she screened TF 77 in its air operations, sailed with the escort and patrol force, and gave bombardment and close gunfire support to the troops ashore.

=== Radar picket destroyer ===
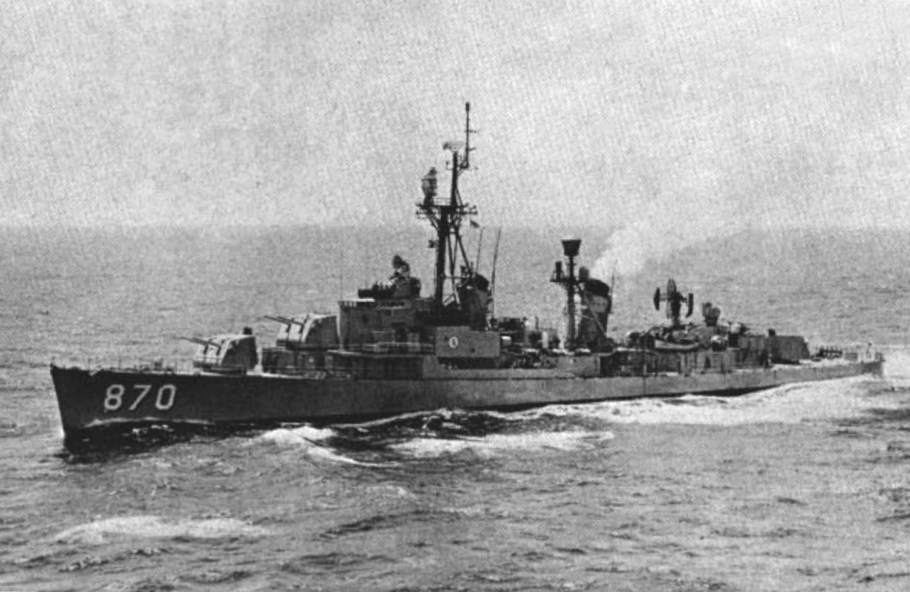
Fechteler as a radar picket destroyer, circa 1961.

Fechteler was decommissioned and placed in reserve 1 April 1953, for conversion to a radar picket destroyer. Recommissioned 1 December 1953, she sailed 10 May 1954 for duty in the Far East until 6 September, when she sailed on westward to join the Atlantic Fleet at Newport, arriving 27 October. In addition to participating in the Atlantic schedule of east coast and Caribbean exercises, she also joined in a midshipman cruise in the summer of 1955, voyaging to Málaga, Spain; Plymouth, England; and Guantánamo Bay, Cuba.

Once more assigned to the Pacific Fleet, Fechteler sailed from Newport 14 May 1956 for Long Beach, which she reached 28 June. In 1956, 1957–58, 1958–59, and 1960, she cruised in the Far East on duty with the 7th Fleet, serving both on the Taiwan Patrol, and with carrier task forces as a radar warning ship.

=== FRAM ===
In 1963, Fechteler entered the Long Beach Naval Shipyard and received the FRAM I modernisation. She was redesignated DD-870 and operated off Vietnam in the second half of the 1960s.

The destroyer was stricken on 11 September 1970. On 28 June 1972, she was sold to Zidell Explorations Inc. at Portland, Oregon and broken up for scrap.

Fechteler received five battle stars for Korean War service.
