= Cuban Pacification Medal (Navy) =

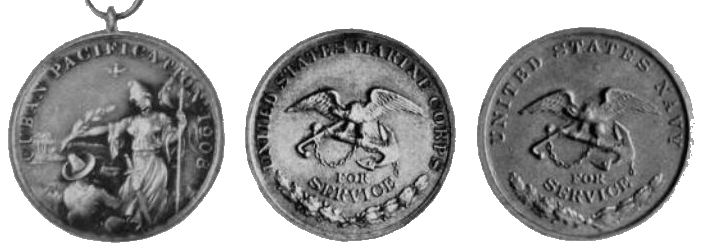
- Obverse (left), Marine Corps reverse (center), and Navy reverse (right)
- Type: Service medal
- Awarded for: Service in the Cuban Pacification
- Presented by: Department of the Navy
- Status: Obsolete
- Established: 13 August 1909
- Ribbon

Precedence
- Next (higher): China Campaign Medal
- Equivalent: Cuban Pacification Medal (Army)
- Next (lower): Nicaraguan Campaign Medal

The Cuban Pacification Medal (Navy) is a military award of the United States Navy which was created by orders of the United States Navy Department on 13 August 1909. The medal was awarded to officers and enlisted men who served ashore in Cuba between 12 September 1906 and 1 April 1909, or who were attached to a specific number of ships, for the Cuban Pacification.

== Eligible ships ==
The crews of the following ships were awarded the Cuban Pacification Medal (Navy) for service during the noted periods of time:

Ship	Dates	Ship	Dates
USS Alabama	11–16 February 1907	USS Brooklyn	7 October–1 November 1906
USS Celtic	28 September 1906 – 15 January 1907	USS Cleveland	21 September 1906 – 13 January 1907
USS Columbia	20 October 1906 – 17 April 1907	USS Denver	12 September 1906 – 2 October 1906
USS Des Moines	15 September 1906 – 25 January 1907	USS Dixie	12–21 September 1906; 7 January 1907 – 18 August 1907
USS Dubuque	18–19 May 1907	USS Eagle	4 December 1906 – 1 June 1907
USS Illinois	11–16 February 1907	USS Indiana	30 September–8 October 1906; 11–16 February 1907
USS Iowa	11–16 February 1907	USS Kentucky	30 September–9 October 1906
USS Louisiana	21 September–13 October 1906; 25–29 December 1906	USS Marietta	14 September 1906 – 9 October 1907; 18–21 January 1907; 7 February 1907–7 February 1908; 18–25 March 1908; 15–16 April 1908; 27 May–9 June 1908; 30 June–11 July 1908
USS Minneapolis	22 September–22 October 1906	USS Newark	22 September–9 November 1906
USS New Jersey	21 September–13 October 1906	USS Paducah	12 September 1906 – 1 April 1909
USS Prairie	6 October–21 November 1906; 29 January–16 May 1907; 25–31 December 1908; 17–23 January 1909	USS Tacoma	21 September 1906 – 26 February 1907
USS Texas	9–30 October 1906	USS Virginia	21 September–13 October 1906
