= USS Piqua =

USS Piqua has been the name of more than one United States Navy ship, and may refer to:

- USS Piqua (SP-130), previously named USS Kanawha II (SP-130), a patrol vessel in commission from 1917 to 1918 as USS Kanawha II and as USS Piqua from 1918 to 1919
- Piqua (YTB-793), a tug in service from 1967 to 2001
