= Ogden Hoffman Jr. =

American judge

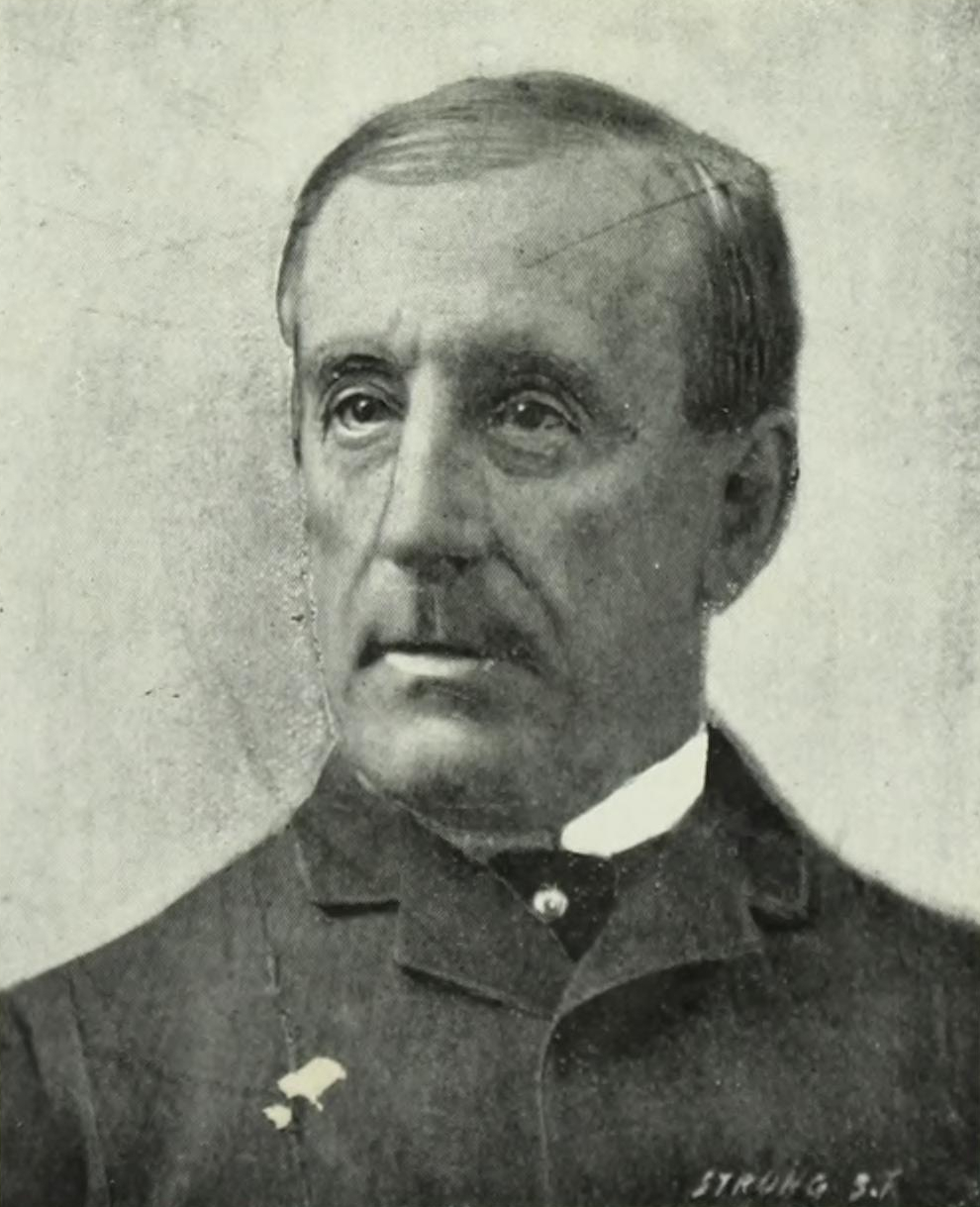

Judge of the United States District Court for the Northern District of California
- In office August 5, 1886 – August 9, 1891
- Appointed by: operation of law
- Preceded by: Seat established by 24 Stat. 308
- Succeeded by: William W. Morrow

Judge of the United States District Court for the District of California
- In office July 27, 1866 – August 5, 1886
- Appointed by: operation of law
- Preceded by: Seat established by 14 Stat. 300
- Succeeded by: Seat abolished

Judge of the United States District Court for the Southern District of California
- In office August 31, 1852 – January 18, 1854
- Appointed by: operation of law
- Preceded by: Seat established by 10 Stat. 76
- Succeeded by: Seat abolished

Judge of the United States District Court for the Northern District of California
- In office February 27, 1851 – July 27, 1866
- Appointed by: Millard Fillmore
- Preceded by: Seat established by 9 Stat. 521
- Succeeded by: Seat abolished

Personal details
- Born: Ogden Hoffman Jr. October 16, 1822 New York City, US
- Died: August 9, 1891 (aged 68) San Francisco, California, US
- Resting place: Mount Tamalpais Cemetery; San Rafael, California
- Parent(s): Ogden Hoffman; Emily (Burrall) Hoffman
- Relatives: Josiah Ogden Hoffman (grandfather)
- Education: Columbia University (A.B.); Harvard Law School (LL.B.)
- Occupation: Attorney

Ogden Hoffman Jr. (October 16, 1822 – August 9, 1891) was a United States district judge of the United States District Court for the District of California, the United States District Court for the Northern District of California and the United States District Court for the Southern District of California.

== Early life ==
Hoffman was born in New York City on October 16, 1822. He received an Artium Baccalaureus degree in 1840 from Columbia University and a Bachelor of Laws from Harvard Law School in 1842. He entered private practice in New York City in 1842, and from 1844 to 1850. From 1842 to 1844, he studied in Paris, where he acquired a working knowledge of French and several other languages. He continued private practice in San Francisco, California, from 1850 to 1851.

== Federal judicial service ==
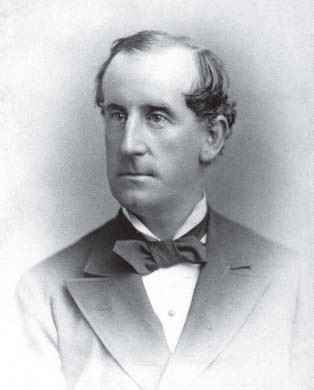
Reproduction of 1893 portrait on display at United States District Court for the Northern District of California.

Hoffman was nominated by President Millard Fillmore on February 1, 1851, to a new seat on the United States District Court for the Northern District of California authorized by 9 Stat. 521. He was confirmed by the United States Senate on February 27, 1851, and received his commission the same day. He was assigned by operation of law to additional and concurrent service to a new seat on the United States District Court for the Southern District of California on August 31, 1852, authorized by 10 Stat. 76. His service in the Southern District terminated on January 18, 1854.

On July 27, 1866, Hoffman was reassigned by operation of law to the United States District Court for the District of California, confirmed by the U.S. Senate for a new seat authorized by 14 Stat. 300. Hoffman was reassigned by operation of law to the United States District Court for the Northern District of California on August 5, 1886, to a new seat authorized by 24 Stat. 308.

Hoffman's judicial service terminated on August 9, 1891, due to his death in San Francisco. He was succeeded by Judge William W. Morrow. At the time of his death, he was the last federal judge in active service to have been appointed by President Fillmore, and the longest-serving on the bench.

== Death and burial ==
Hoffman died in San Francisco on August 9, 1891. He was interred at Mount Tamalpais Cemetery in San Rafael, California.

== Family ==
Hoffman was son of Ogden Hoffman and Emily (Burrall) Hoffman. He was the grandson of Josiah Ogden Hoffman (1766–1837), the New York Attorney General from 1795 to 1802.

Hoffman never married, and had no children.

== See also ==
- List of United States federal judges by longevity of service

== Sources ==
Legal offices
Preceded by Seat established by 9 Stat. 521	Judge of the United States District Court for the Northern District of California; 1851–1866	Succeeded by Seat abolished
Preceded by Seat established by 10 Stat. 76	Judge of the United States District Court for the Southern District of California; 1852–1854	Succeeded by Seat abolished
Preceded by Seat established by 14 Stat. 300	Judge of the United States District Court for the District of California; 1866–1886	Succeeded by Seat abolished
Preceded by Seat established by 24 Stat. 308	Judge of the United States District Court for the Northern District of California; 1886–1891	Succeeded by William W. Morrow
