= USS Fechteler (DE-157) =

Buckley-class destroyer escort

Coordinates: 36°7′N 2°40′W

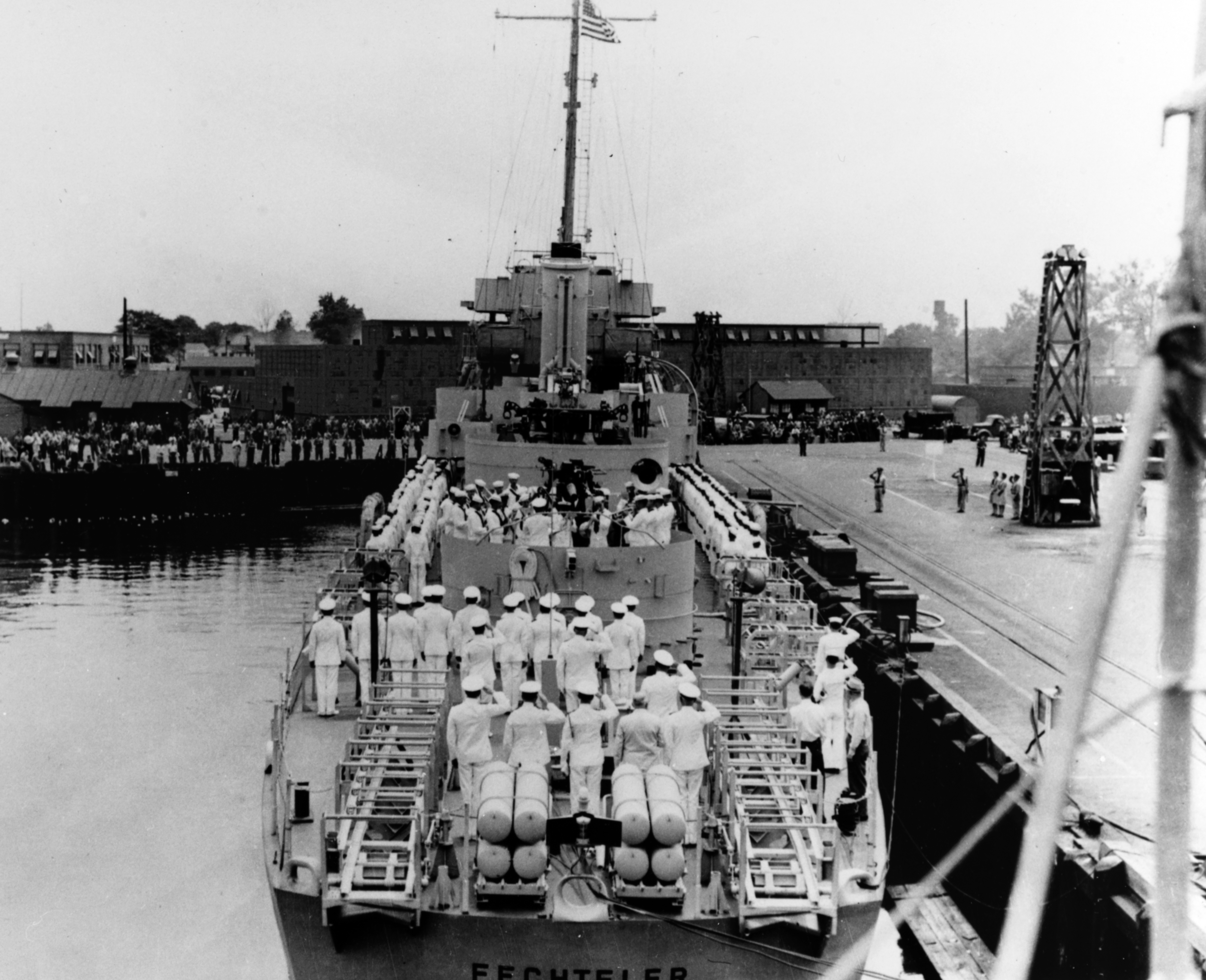

History

United States
- Name: USS Fechteler
- Namesake: Rear Admiral Augustus Fechteler
- Ordered: 1942
- Builder: Norfolk Navy Yard
- Laid down: 7 February 1943
- Launched: 22 April 1943
- Commissioned: 1 July 1943
- Decommissioned: 5 May 1944
- Honors and awards: 1 battle star (World War II)
- Fate: Torpedoed and sunk, 5 May 1944

General characteristics
- Class & type: Buckley-class destroyer escort
- Displacement: 1,400 long tons (1,422 t) light; 1,673 long tons (1,700 t) standard
- Length: 306 ft (93 m)
- Beam: 37 ft (11 m)
- Draft: 13 ft 6 in (4.11 m)
- Propulsion: 2 × boilers; General Electric turbo-electric drive; 12,000 shp (8.9 MW); 2 × solid manganese-bronze 3,600 lb (1,600 kg) 3-bladed propellers, 8 ft 6 in (2.59 m) diameter, 7 ft 7 in (2.31 m) pitch; 2 × rudders; 359 tons fuel oil
- Speed: 23 knots (43 km/h; 26 mph)
- Complement: 15 officers, 198 men
- Armament: 3 × 3"/50 caliber guns; 1 × quad 1.1"/75 caliber gun; 8 × single 20 mm guns; 1 × triple 21 inch (533 mm) torpedo tubes; 1 × Hedgehog anti-submarine mortar; 8 × K-gun depth charge projectors; 2 × depth charge tracks

USS Fechteler (DE-157) was a Buckley-class destroyer escort in service with the United States Navy from 1943 to 1944. She was sunk by the German submarine U-967 in the Western Mediterranean on 5 May 1944.

== History ==
The destroyer escort was named in honor of Augustus Fechteler, a rear admiral who served in the United States Navy during World War I. Fechteler was launched on 22 April 1943 at the Norfolk Naval Shipyard; sponsored by Miss Joan S. Fechteler, granddaughter of Rear Admiral Fechteler and commissioned 1 July 1943.

Between 8 September 1943 and 31 December, Fechteler made two voyages on the key convoy route New York – Netherlands West Indies – North Africa, escorting vulnerable tankers carrying fuel and other oil products essential to modern warfare. After overhaul at New York City, she took part in experimental antisubmarine exercises in Narragansett Bay, from which she sailed on 28 February 1944 for the Azores and Derry, Northern Ireland. Arriving on 6 March 1944, she joined the escort of a New York-bound convoy, reaching the United States on 22 March.

On 1 April 1944, Fechteler sailed from New York for Hampton Roads, Virginia, where she joined a convoy for Bizerte, arriving on 22 April after coming under heavy enemy air attack two days before. Homeward-bound, Fechteler was torpedoed by U-967 commanded by Albrecht Brandi on 5 May in the Western Mediterranean. As the ship began to break in two and sink, it was abandoned. Twenty-nine of the crew were killed and 26 wounded. USS Laning and other ships of the convoy rescued 186 survivors.

== Awards ==
Fechteler received one battle star for World War II service.
