= Augustus F. Fechteler =

United States Navy admiral (1857–1921

Augustus Francis Fechteler
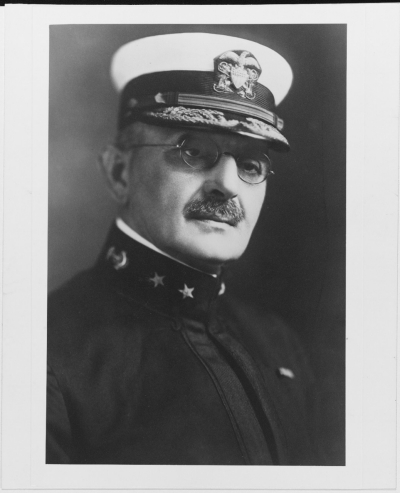
- Rear Admiral Augustus F. Fechteler
- Born: September 1, 1857; Paderborn, Prussia
- Died: May 26, 1921 (aged 63)
- Burial place: Arlington National Cemetery
- Spouse: Maud Morrow (1873–1928)
- Relatives: William Fechteler (son); Frank Caspar Fechteler (son)
- Military career
- Allegiance: United States of America
- Branch: United States Navy
- Service years: 1877–1921
- Rank: Rear Admiral
- Commands: Dubuque; South Carolina; Second Division, Atlantic Fleet; Seventh Division, Atlantic Fleet; Sixth Division, Atlantic Fleet; Commandant, Norfolk Navy Yard; Commandant, Fifth Naval District
- Conflicts: Spanish–American War; Philippine–American War; World War I
- Awards: Spanish Campaign Medal; Philippine Campaign Medal; Navy Cross; Victory Medal

Augustus Francis Fechteler (1 September 1857 – 26 May 1921) was a Rear Admiral of the United States Navy during World War I. He had two sons who also served in the Navy, Admiral William Fechteler was Chief of Naval Operations, and Lieutenant Frank Caspar Fechteler, an early naval aviator, died in an airplane crash 18 September 1922.

== Early life ==
Augustus Francis Fechteler, born in Paderborn, Prussia (now in Germany) 1 September 1857. His family emigrated to the United States in 1865.

== Naval service ==
He was appointed Cadet Midshipman to the US Naval Academy by Thomas J. Creamer, Member of Congress from the Seventh District of New York, in June 1873, and completed the course on 20 June 1877.

His first service at sea was on European Station, and from June 1879 to November 1888 he served successively aboard the Shenandoah with the United States Coast and Geodetic Survey from 1882 to 1885, on the receiving ship Vermont, on training ships Jamestown and Portsmouth, and on Essex. On 10 January 1889, he reported to the Bureau of Navigation, Navy department, Washington, DC, and a year later was transferred to the Office of Naval Intelligence, where he remained until January 1892.

He was placed in charge of a draft of men sent to Mare Island, California, to serve as crew for USS Mohican (1883), and reported aboard that vessel on 16 February 1892. He completed that period of sea duty in October 1894, and for a year thereafter was in charge of the Branch Hydrographic Office, San Francisco, California. From October 1895 to August 1896, he was in charge of Inspection of Ships, and on 19 September joined Monterey. He completed inspection of first class battleship Oregon in November 1896, and in December 1898 joined gunboat Concord on Asiatic Station until August 1899, when he joined Solace for transportation back to Mare Island, California. There he served as aide to the Commandant until 15 August 1901.

Duty as navigator of Iowa, from 16 August 1901, until she was decommissioned on 16 July 1903, was followed by inspection duty for the Bureaus of Ordnance and Engineering at the Union Iron Works, San Francisco, until 2 March 1904. He then returned to the Office of Naval Intelligence, Navy Department, where he served during the following year. In May 1905, he went to New York to inspect Dubuque, and commanded her from her commissioning until 22 December 1906.

While on duty as a Member of the Board of Inspection and Survey, Navy Department, he inspected Brooklyn and Mississippi. He attended the Conference of Officers at the Naval War College, Newport, Rhode Island, resuming his inspection duties in September 1908. He was assigned duty as General Inspector of battleship South Carolina at the works of William Cramp & Sons, Philadelphia, in October 1909, and assumed command at her commissioning on 1 March 1910. When detached in November 1911, he was designated President of the Board of Inspection and Survey (for ships), and from 18 December that year he had additional temporary duty in connection with battleship plans to the General Board, Navy Department.

He attended a course at the Naval War College from November 1914 until Jul 1915, when he was ordered to Provincetown, Massachusetts, to assume command of the Second Division, Atlantic Fleet, under the commander-in-chief, and on 24 July, he was commissioned Rear Admiral, to date from 11 July 1915. His flag remained in Florida after he was transferred on 15 May 1916, to duty as Commander Seventh Division, but was transferred to New York and later to Utah, when he was in command of the Sixth Division from 19 June 1916, during World War I, to 2 February 1918.

On 5 February 1918, he assumed the duties of Commandant, Norfolk Navy Yard, Virginia, and remained in that assignment throughout the latter months of the war and until 10 April 1919. He was awarded the Navy Cross and cited as follows: "For exceptionally meritorious service in a duty of great responsibility as Division Commander, Sixth Division of the Atlantic Fleet, and later as Commandant of the Navy Yard, Norfolk, Virginia."

Transferred to duty as Commandant of the Fifth Naval District, with headquarters at Norfolk, Virginia, he reported on 10 April 1919. He died on 26 May 1921, at the Naval Operating Base, Hampton Roads, Virginia.

== Awards ==
- Navy Cross
- Spanish Campaign Medal
- Philippine Campaign Medal
- World War I Victory Medal

=== Navy Cross citation ===
The President of the United States of America takes pleasure in presenting the Navy Cross to Rear Admiral Augustus Francis Fechteler, United States Navy, for exceptionally meritorious service in a duty of great responsibility as Division Commander of the Atlantic Fleet and later as Commandant of the Navy Yard, Norfolk, Va.

== Notes ==
Citations

== Bibliography ==
Online resources

- "Augustus Francis Fechteler: 1 September 1857–26 May 1921". Naval History and Heritage Command. 31 October 2016.

This article incorporates text from this source, which is in the public domain.
