= Consolidated Yachts =

Marine service provider and former shipbuilder in New York

Coordinates: 40°51′8.16″N 73°55′23.09″W

- Industry: Shipbuilding; Marine repair
- Predecessors: Charles L. Seabury Company; Gas Engine & Power Company; Consolidated Shipbuilding
- Founded: June 1896; 130 years ago (via merger)
- Headquarters: City Island, Bronx, NY

Consolidated Yachts is a former shipbuilder and (as of 2021) present-day marine service company located on City Island in The Bronx, New York City.

== History ==
The company was founded as the Gas Engine and Power Company & Charles L. Seabury Company in 1896 after the merger of the Charles L. Seabury Company (founded in 1885 in Nyack, New York) and the Gas Engine & Power Company (founded about the same time in Morris Heights, Bronx). Seabury was famous for its steam yachts; the Gas Engine & Power Company's primary focus was on naptha-powered launches. Among other products, the combined company manufactured express cruisers, runabouts, yacht tenders, gas engines and alcohol ranges under the Speedway brand. The manufacturing facility in Morris Heights was referred to as the Speedway Shipyard, and it stood along Mathewson Road, near what is today the location of Roberto Clemente State Park. On July 16, 1908 Charles L. Seabury & Co's shipyard launched the "largest yacht in the world driven by motor power ... in the presence of its owner Charles Henry Fletcher". She was 111 feet over all, with a 21-foot beam, and 260 horse power and an engineering feat for luxury yachts of the time.

After the First World War the company rebranded itself as Consolidated Shipbuilding. It was heavily involved in the production of small yachts and military vessels, employing as many as 3,000 skilled tradespeople to that end. Upon the conclusion of World War II, the company moved from Morris Heights to the former Robert Jacobs shipyard on City Island, and it continued to build ships until 1958.

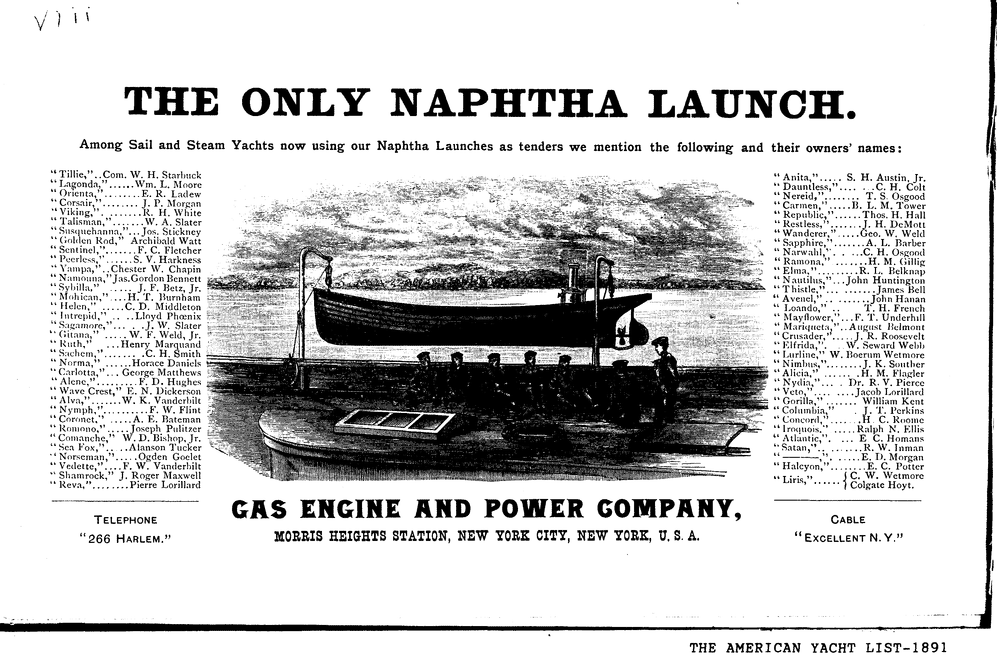
Advertisement for naptha-powered launches in the 1891 American Yacht List

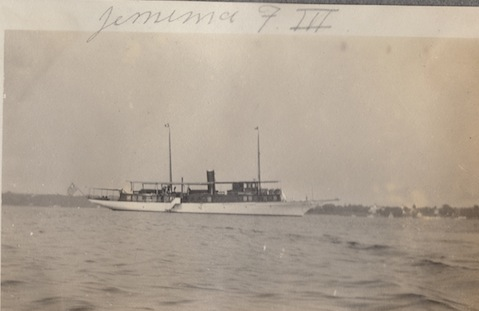
The Jemima F., III, built by Charles L Seabury Co.

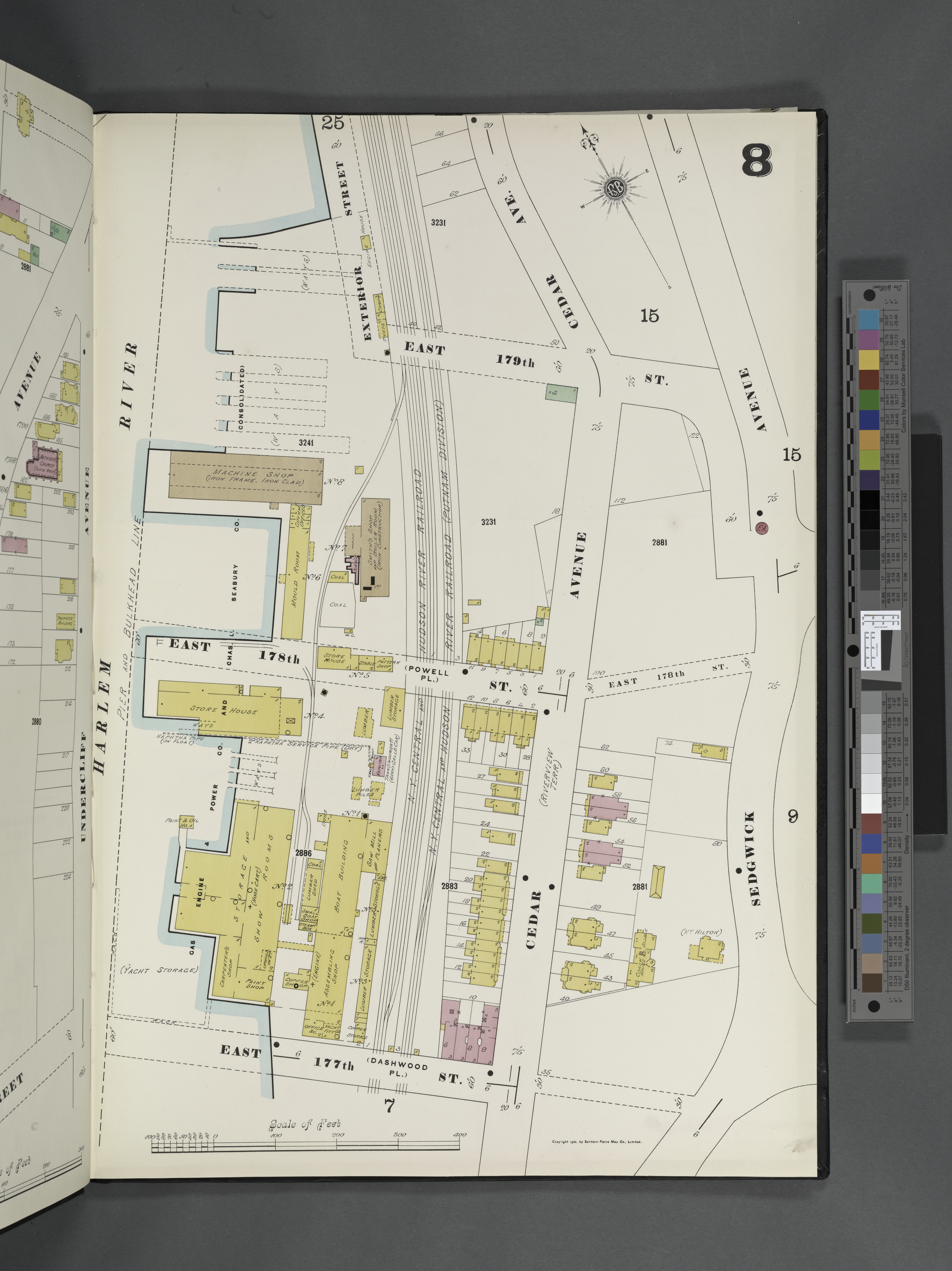
Map of the Charles L. Seabury Company facilities in Morris Heights, Bronx

== Yachts built ==
  - SY 'Kanahwa' (1899) 475 ton luxury steam yacht for John P. Duncan converted in 1917 to create USS Piqua

== World War II shipbuilding ==
- tugboats
  - Montezuma (YT-145), Hoga (YT-146), Tazha (YT-147), Wenonah (YT-148)
  - YT-364 ... YT-367, YT-388 ... YT-393, YT-520, YT-532 ... YT-545
  - DPC-81 ... DPC-92, ST-752 ... ST-757, ST-769, ST-771
- 51 of 343 PC-461-class submarine chasers
  - PC-483 ... PC-487, PC-503, PC-504
  - PC-600 ... PC-603, PC-1191 ... PC-1210
  - PC-1237 ... PC-1240, PC-1264, PC-1265
  - PC-1546 ... PC-1559
