= Gilbert T. Rude =

Gibert T. Rude
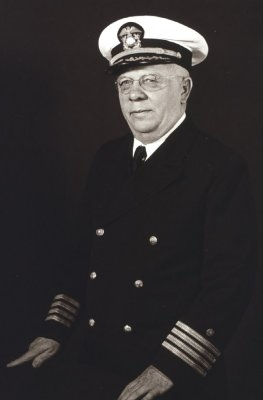
- Captain Gilbert T. Rude
- Born: September 13, 1881; Sharps, Virginia
- Died: 1962 (aged 80–81)
- Military career
- Allegiance: United States of America
- Branch: United States Coast and Geodetic Survey (1903-1917 and from 1919); United States Navy (1917-1919)
- Service years: 1903 - ?
- Rank: Captain
- Commands: USC&GS Taku; USC&GS Isis; USS Isis; Chief of Division of Tides and Currents; Chief of Division of Coastal Surveys
- Conflicts: World War I
- Awards: Norman Medal

Gilbert T. Rude (1881–1962) was an officer in the United States Coast and Geodetic Survey—one of the ancestor organizations of the United States National Oceanic and Atmospheric Administration (NOAA) -- and the United States Navy. He served as Chief of the Division of Coastal Surveys in the Coast and Geodetic Survey. A NOAA ship was named for him.

== Early life ==
Rude (pronounced ROO - dee) was born in Sharps, Virginia, on September 13, 1881, and received his education at Washington College in Chestertown, Maryland.

== Career ==
=== Early U.S. Coast and Geodetic Survey career, 1903-1917 ===
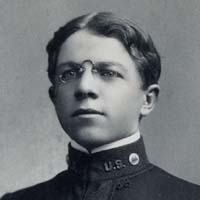
Gilbert T. Rude

Rude entered the Coast and Geodetic Survey as a deck officer on January 19, 1903. Upon entering service in the Survey, he served two years aboard the survey schooner USC&GS Matchless, then in 1905 transferred to a two-year tour of duty in the Philippine Islands. In 1907, he began an eight-year tour as commanding officer of the survey ship USC&GS Taku in the Territory of Alaska. From 1915 to 1917, he commanded the survey ship USC&GS Isis on the United States East Coast.

=== World War I U.S. Navy service, 1917-1919 ===
When the United States entered World War I in 1917, he was transferred to the United States Navy, serving first as commanding officer of USS Isis—the former USC&GS Isis, temporarily in U.S. Navy service in the New York City area as a cruiser squadron flagship—and then as navigating officer on the troop transport USS Mercury (ID-3012).

=== U.S. Coast and Geodetic Survey career from 1919 ===
Rude was transferred back to the Coast and Geodetic Survey in March 1919 and became Chief of what was then the Section of Tides and Currents, which under his guidance soon was upgraded to a division. In his early boyhood he had been interested in a "gadget" installed on the waterfront near his home which measured the tides, and during his service as Chief of Tides and Currents, his interest in this first hobby bore fruit in his division, as it started the standard tide gauge and developed a new portable automatic tide gauge. He wrote many articles and publications relating to tides and currents, and for one entitled "Tides and Their Engineering Aspects" the American Society of Civil Engineers presented him with the Norman Medal in 1929.

From August 1928 to March 1931, Rude was inspector of construction of the Coast and Geodetic survey ship USC&GS Hydrographer, which he delivered to Washington, D.C. in April 1931. He then became Chief of Coastal Surveys, which position he held until retirement. Some of the outstanding developments and improvements of the Division of Coastal Surveys during his tour as its chief were the advancement of echo sounding; the development of submarine valley surveys; the use of taut wire; the use of radio acoustic ranging; the study and development of radar for use in surveying; the construction of the new survey ships USC&GS Explorer, USC&GS Pathfinder (OSS-30), USC&GS Lester Jones (ASV-79), USC&GS Patton (ASV-80), USC&GS Hilgard, and USC&GS Wainwright, and the acquisition of the survey ships USC&GS Parker, USC&GS Stirni, and USC&GS Sosbee.

Captain Rude took an active part in scientific meetings and attended several of the International Hydrographic Bureau meetings at Monaco. His invention, the Mariner's Practical Star Finder and Identifier, was purchased by the U.S. Navy and is furnished to all its vessels. He retired with the rank of captain.

Captain Rude was a member of several engineering and scientific societies, including the American Society of Civil Engineers, Philosophical Society of Washington, the Association of American Geographers, the Society of American Military Engineers, the International Aeroarctic Society, and others.

During his service in the Coast and Geodetic Survey, Captain Rude was untiring in his efforts to improve surveying methods and equipment and he was always alert to encourage others to do likewise.

== Death ==
Rude died in 1962.

== Namesake ==
The survey ship NOAAS Rude (S 590), in service with the Coast and Geodetic Survey as USC&GS Rude (ASV 90) from 1967 to 1970 and with the National Oceanic and Atmospheric Administration as NOAAS Rude from 1970 to 2008, was named for Rude.
