= Nicholas H. Heck =

American USCGSC officer (1882–1953)

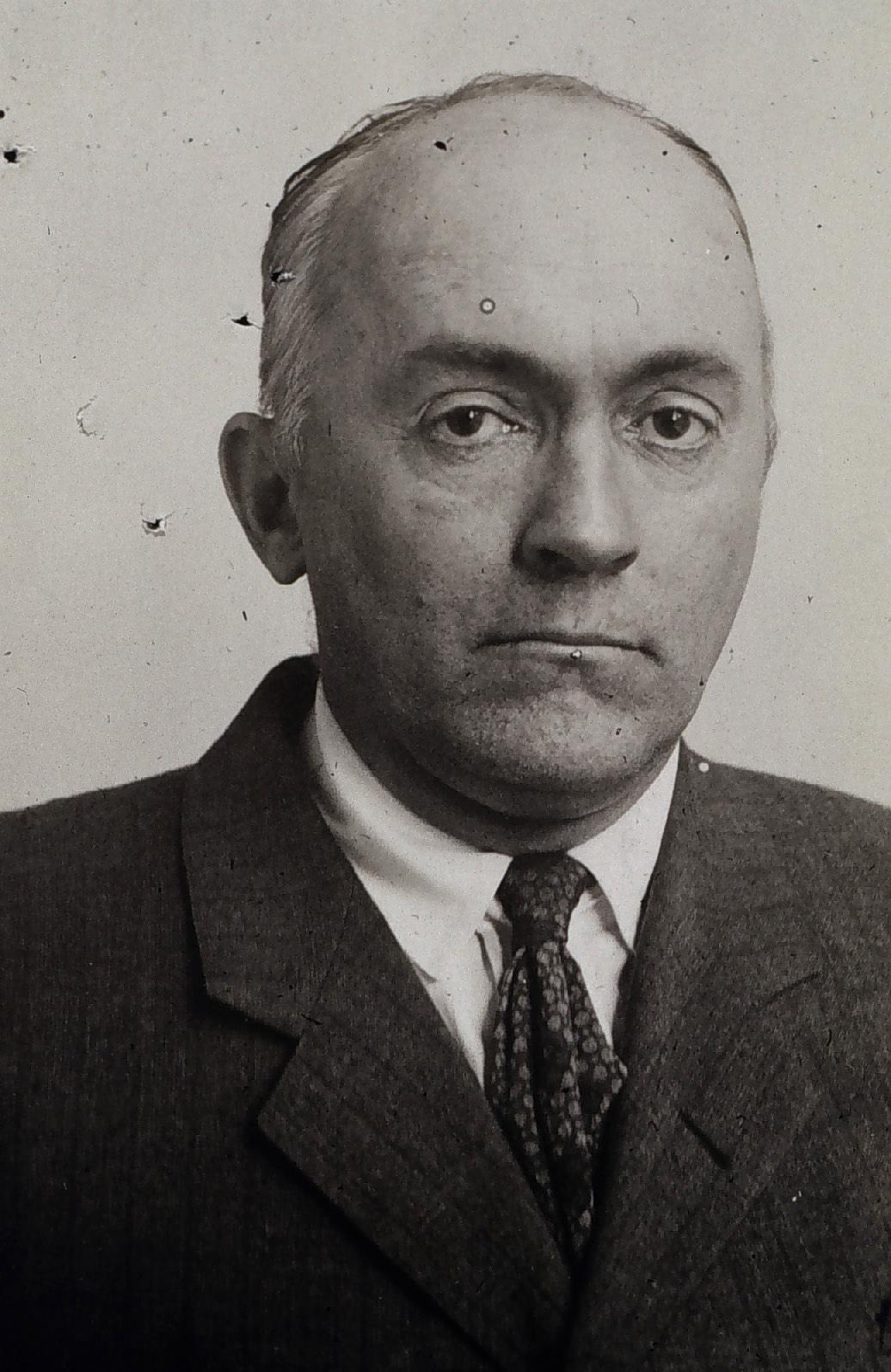
- Nicholas H. Heck, probably ca. 1940.
- Born: 1 September 1882; Heckton Mills, Dauphin County, Pennsylvania, US
- Died: 21 December 1953 (aged 71); Fairfax County, Virginia, US
- Burial place: Arlington National Cemetery; Arlington, Virginia
- Military career
- Allegiance: United States of America
- Branch: United States Coast and Geodetic Survey Corps (1917; 1919–1945); United States Navy (1917–1919)
- Rank: Captain (Coast and Geodetic Survey); Lieutenant commander (U.S. Naval Reserve Force)
- Conflicts: World War I

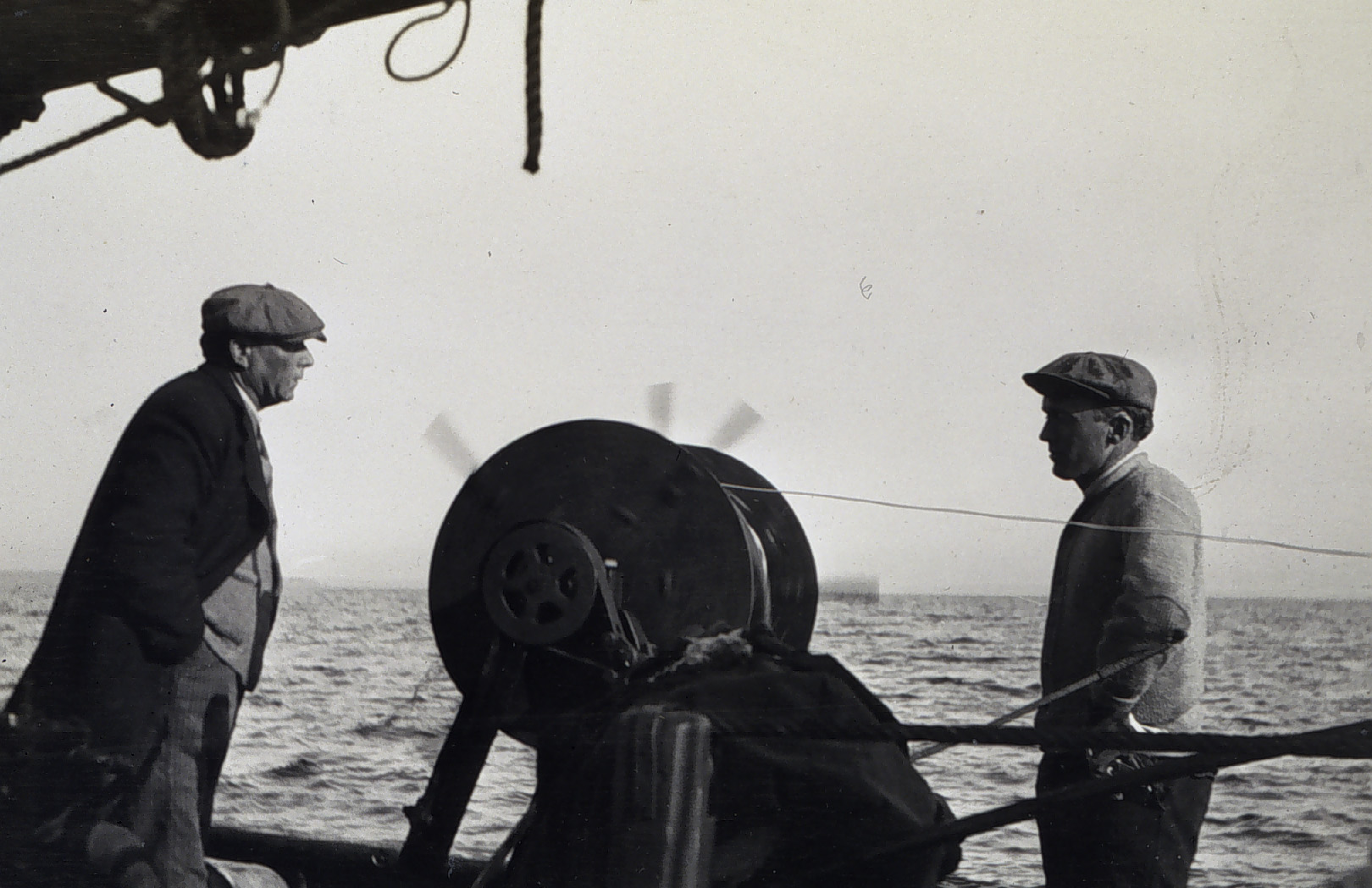
Nicholas Heck (right) aboard the contract sloop Nena Rowland during wire-drag survey operations in 1913. It is the only known photograph of Heck in the field.

Captain Nicholas Hunter Heck (1 September 1882 – 21 December 1953) was a career officer of the United States Coast and Geodetic Survey Corps. A leading geophysicist of his time, Heck made important contributions in the study of seismology and oceanography. He also revolutionized hydrographic surveying by developing the wire-drag surveying technique and introduced radio acoustic ranging into Coast and Geodetic Survey hydrography.

== Early life ==
Nicholas Hunter Heck was born on 1 September 1882, the son of John Lewis Heck (1843–1927) and the former Mary Frances Hays (1848–1904), in Heckton Mills – a settlement named for his grandfather, Dr. Lewis Heck (1810–1890) – in Dauphin County, Pennsylvania, near what is now Heckton. After primary and secondary education at private schools in Harrisburg, Pennsylvania, Heck attended Lehigh University, from which he graduated with a Bachelor of Arts degree in 1903 despite enduring an attack of typhoid fever. He continued to study at the university for an additional year, receiving a Bachelor of Science in civil engineering in 1904.

== Career ==
=== Wire-drag surveying ===
After completing college, Heck accepted civilian employment with the United States Coast and Geodetic Survey in 1904. That year, the Coast and Geodetic Survey introduced the wire-drag method of conducting hydrographic surveys, which prior to the advent of sidescan sonar and multibeam sonar late in the 20th century was the only means of searching large areas of water for underwater obstructions or sunken ships or aircraft. Between 1906 and 1916, Heck was responsible for much of the development of the wire-drag technique, expanding the capability of wire-drag systems from a relatively limited area to sweeps covering channels two to three nautical miles (3.7 to 5.6 km) in width. Wire-drag surveying played a notable role in clearing unsurveyed channels in the waters of Alaska, discovered hundreds of obstructions elsewhere, and proved particularly useful to the United States during its participation in World War I. The wire-drag technique was a major contribution to hydrographic surveying during much of the rest of the 20th century, not falling into disuse until the early 1990s.

=== World War I ===
The United States entered World War I on the side of the Allies on 6 April 1917. On 22 May 1917, the United States Coast and Geodetic Survey Corps – the ancestor of the National Oceanic and Atmospheric Administration Commissioned Officer Corps – was created as a new uniformed service of the United States to enhance the participation of the Coast and Geodetic Survey in the war effort. Heck was commissioned as a lieutenant in the new service, and was among Coast and Geodetic Survey Corps officers transferred on 24 September 1917 under Executive Order 2707 to the United States Naval Reserve Force for wartime duty with the United States Navy.

On 24 September 1917, the day of his assignment to the Navy, Heck was commissioned as a lieutenant in the Naval Reserve Force, and on 9 October 1917 he was assigned to the Naval Experimental Station at New London, Connecticut. His work there, under the Special Board of Anti-Submarine Devices, involved study of a number of complicated topics but centered around the use of underwater acoustics as a means of detecting submarines and developing a trailing wire device for locating submarines at rest on the sea bottom. On 18 September 1918, he was reassigned to U.S. Naval Headquarters in London, England, to put into operational use the equipment developed during his time in New London. Preparations to put the equipment into service were completed on 5 November 1918, but on 7 November he received orders to suspend operations. The war ended on 11 November 1918, and after that the operation of the new antisubmarine equipment ceased entirely.

On 15 December 1918, Heck returned to New London and resumed his duties at the Naval Experimental Station. On 25 February 1919, he received a promotion to lieutenant commander in the Naval Reserve Force. His Navy duty came to an end on 19 March 1919.

=== Echo sounding and radio acoustic ranging ===
==== Early experiments ====
Heck returned to duty as a Coast and Geodetic Survey Corps officer on 20 March 1919, bringing with him the experience in underwater acoustics he gained during his tour with the Navy, as well as contacts with U.S. Navy, Royal Navy, and United States Army Coast Artillery Corps researchers investigating the practical application of acoustics in an ocean environment. During the next few years, developments in the application of acoustics to depth sounding and navigation would afford him an opportunity to revolutionize hydrographic surveying techniques.

By the immediate post-World War I period, research into the use of acoustics had resulted in a primitive ability to use sound to measure depths by bouncing it off the sea bottom and measuring the time it took the sound to make the round trip. By early 1923, experiments in this area by the United States Department of the Navy, as well as by the French and the British, suggested to Heck that the Coast and Geodetic Survey should look into adopting this new technique of echo sounding into its surveying work, using it to make depth soundings in deep water more quickly and cheaply than it could by deploying long lead lines all the way to the bottom from survey ships; a 20,000-foot (6,096-meter) depth could be measured in only about eight seconds with an echo sounder, while the use of a lead line to determine the depth could take an hour.

In addition, lighthouses, buoys, and lightships along the coast of the United States in recent years increasingly had received navigation aids that used underwater bells to generate sounds which approaching ships could detect; by noting the bearing of each sound source, a ship's crew could determine the position of its ship even when poor visibility did not permit the sighting of a light. In 1923, a radio transmitter was added to these systems so that they could broadcast a signal identifying themselves to approaching ships and informing the ships that they would emit an acoustic signal at a certain defined time interval after the radio signal, allowing a ship to determine its direction and distance from the navigation aid. Meanwhile, the U.S. Army Coast Artillery Corps's Subaqueous Sound Ranging Section had conducted post-World War I experiments in shallow water in Vineyard Sound off Massachusetts in which it had detonated explosive charges underwater at the ends of established baselines and measured the amount of time it took for the sound to arrive at hydrophones at the other ends of the baselines in order to establish very accurate measurements of the speed of sound through water.

Realizing the potential of these applications of acoustics to hydrographic surveying and navigation, particularly along the United States West Coast, where fog frequently interfered with attempts to fix ship positions accurately, Colonel Ernest Lester Jones, then Director of the Coast and Geodetic Survey, in consultation with Coast and Geodetic Survey Corps officers, decided to investigate the use of acoustics in both depth finding and navigation. With his acoustics experience in World War I, Heck, who by then was Chief of the Coast and Geodetic Survey's Division of Terrestrial Magnetism, was the obvious choice to lead this effort. By January 1923, the Coast and Geodetic Survey had decided to install a Hayes sonic rangefinder – an early echosounder – aboard the survey ship USC&GS Guide, which the Coast and Geodetic Survey planned to commission into its fleet later that year, and when Heck contacted E. A. Stephenson of the U.S. Army Coastal Artillery Corps to inform him of this plan and to inquire further about the Vineyard Sound experiments, Stephenson suggested that a system of hydrophones detecting the sound of underwater explosions could allow Coast and Geodetic Survey ships to fix their position while conducting surveys.

Heck agreed, but believed that existing navigation aids would not meet the needs of the Coast and Geodetic Survey in terms of the immediacy and accuracy of position fixes. He envisioned improving on previous concepts by creating what became known as the radio acoustic ranging (RAR) method. In Heck's concept, a survey ship's crew would drop an explosive charge off the ship's stern, detonate it, and note the time the sound arrived at the ship using a chronograph. Hydrophones installed at known positions would also detect the sound when it arrived at their locations and then automatically send a radio signal to the ship at the instant they detected the sound, recording that time with the ship's chronograph as well. The essentially instantaneous notification of the ship that the sound had arrived at a given set of hydrophones would allow the ship's crew to calculate the distance of their ship from the hydrophones by calculating the difference between the time the ship heard the explosion and the time the sound of the detonation arrived at the distant hydrophones and then multiplying this time by the speed of sound through water. By making these calculations for hydrophones at at least two different known locations, the ship's crew could use triangulation to fix their ship's position.

Heck oversaw tests at Coast and Geodetic Survey headquarters in Washington, D.C., that demonstrated that shipboard recording of the time of an explosion could be performed accurately enough for his concept to work. He worked with Dr. E. A. Eckhardt, a physicist, and M. Keiser, an electrical engineer, of the National Bureau of Standards to develop a hydrophone system that could automatically send a radio signal when it detected the sound of an underwater explosion. When Guide was commissioned in 1923, Heck had her based at New London, Connecticut, and arranged for her under his direction both to test her new echo sounder's ability to make accurate depth soundings and to conduct radio acoustic ranging experiments in cooperation with the U.S. Army Coast Artillery Corps. Despite many difficulties, testing of both echo sounding and radio acoustic ranging wrapped up successfully in November 1923.

==== The cruise of the Guide ====
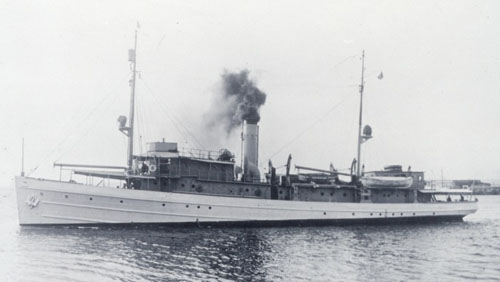
USC&GS Guide

In late November 1923, with Heck aboard, Guide began a voyage via Puerto Rico and the Panama Canal to San Diego, California, where she would be based in the future, with her route planned to take her over a wide variety of ocean depths so that she could continue to test her echo sounder. Guide made history during the voyage, becoming the first Coast and Geodetic Survey ship to use echo sounding to measure and record the depth of the sea at points along her course; she also measured water temperatures and took water samples so that the Scripps Institution for Biological Research (now the Scripps Institution of Oceanography) at La Jolla, California, could measure salinity levels. She also compared echo sounder soundings with those made by lead lines, discovering that using a single speed of sound through water, as had been the previous practice by those conducting echo sounding experiments, yielded acoustic depth-finding results that did not match the depths found by lead lines. Before she reached San Diego in December 1923, she had accumulated much data beneficial to the study of the movement of sound waves through water and measuring their velocity under varying conditions of salinity, density, and temperature.

Upon arrival in California, Heck and Guide personnel in consultation with the Scripps Institution developed formulas that allowed accurate echo sounding of depths in all but the shallowest waters and installed hydrophones at La Jolla and Oceanside, California, to allow experimentation with radio acoustic ranging. Under Heck's direction, Guide then conducted experiments off the coast of California during the early months of 1924 that demonstrated that accurate echo sounding was possible using the new formulas. Experiments with radio acoustic ranging, despite initial difficulties, demonstrated that the method was practical, although difficulty with getting some of the explosive charges to detonate hampered some of the experimental program. In April 1924, the Coast and Geodetic Survey concluded that both echo sounding and radio acoustic ranging were fundamentally sound, with no foundational problems left to solve, and that all that remained necessary was continued development and refinement of both techniques during their operational use. Heck turned over continued development of echo sounding and radio acoustic ranging to Guide's commanding officer, Commander Robert Luce, and returned to his duties in Washington, D.C.

The first non-visual method of navigation in human history, and the first that could be used at any time of day or night and in any weather conditions, radio acoustic ranging was a major step forward in the development of modern navigation systems. Heck revolutionized oceanic surveying through the use of radio electronic ranging to establish ship locations, one of his major contributions to oceanography. His work also helped to develop underwater sound velocity tables allowing the establishment of "true depths" of up to five miles (8 km) using echo sounding, and by 1928 all Coast and Geodetic Survey ships joined Guide in having a deep-water sounding capability.

=== Seismology ===
Heck served as Chief of the Coast and Geodetic Survey's Division of Seismology and Terrestrial Magnetism and was a leader in the development of geophysics, a field in which he had a broad range of interests. He made major contributions to seismology in his research on the energy consumed in the production of earthquakes, and he identified the foci of earthquake activity in mountain, coastal, and undersea areas. In the 1930s, he drew attention to a correlation between earthquake epicenters and the Mid-Atlantic Ridge, first publishing a world seismicity map showing seismic activity there in 1932.

=== Other duties ===
During his career, Heck served as the commanding officer of the five of the largest survey ships in the Coast and Geodetic Survey's fleet. Heck's final position was Scientific Assistant to the Director of the Coast and Geodetic Survey, who at the time was Rear Admiral Leo Otis Colbert. Heck retired with the rank of captain on 30 April 1945.

== Awards ==
Lehigh University awarded Heck an honorary doctor of science degree in 1930. In 1941, Fordham University awarded him one as well. His other academic awards included Phi Beta Kappa and Sigma Xi.

The American Geophysical Union awarded Heck its William Bowie Medal in 1942.

== Personal and professional life ==
Heck was president of the American Geophysical Union from 1932 to 1935 and of the Seismological Society of America from 1937 to 1939. He also served as president of the Seismological Association of the International Union of Geodesy and Geophysics, the Philosophical Society of Washington, and the Washington, D.C., chapter of the Society of Sigma Xi. Heck also was a member or fellow of the Washington Academy of Science, the American Association for the Advancement of Science, the American Society of Civil Engineers, the Society of American Military Engineers, the American Geophysical Union, the Geological Society of America, the National Geographic Society, the Cosmos Club, and the Federal Club.

Heck often returned to Lehigh University to lecture on a variety of topics, and he frequently contributed to the Lehigh Alumni Bulletin. He wrote numerous Coast and Geodetic Survey publications on wire-drag surveying, compensation of the magnetic compass, the velocity of sound in sea water, radio acoustic ranging, and the earthquake history of the United States. He also wrote many articles on magnetism and seismology which were published in the United States and other countries, and he was the author of a popular book published in 1936 entitled Earthquakes.

Heck never married.

== Death ==
Heck died at Mount Vernon Hospital in Fairfax County, Virginia, on 21 December 1953. He was buried at Arlington National Cemetery. Honorary pallbearers at his funeral included Rear Admirals Leo Otis Colbert, Robert F. A. Studds, Robert W. Knox, and Jean H. Hawley and Captains Albert J. Hoskinson, Elliot B. Roberts, Frank S. Borden, Clement L. Garner, Henry W. Hemple, Robert F. Luce, and Gilbert T. Rude – all of the U.S. Coast and Geodetic Survey Corps – and Mr. Raymond Swick, a civilian employee of the Coast and Geodetic Survey.

== Commemoration ==
The Coast and Geodetic Survey auxiliary survey vessel USC&GS Heck (ASV 91), which entered service in 1967, was named for Heck. Alongside her sister ship USC&GS Rude (ASV 90), she engaged in wire-drag surveys. After the 3 October 1970 establishment of the National Oceanic and Atmospheric Administration, Heck and Rude became part of the NOAA fleet as NOAAS Heck (S 591) and NOAAS Rude (S 590) and continued wire-drag operations together until the late 1980s, when new technologies – sidescan sonar and multibeam sonar – rendered the wire-drag method obsolete. Heck then operated independently as part of the NOAA fleet until 1995.
