= USC&GS Isis =

Coordinates: 29.77212°N 81.22192°W

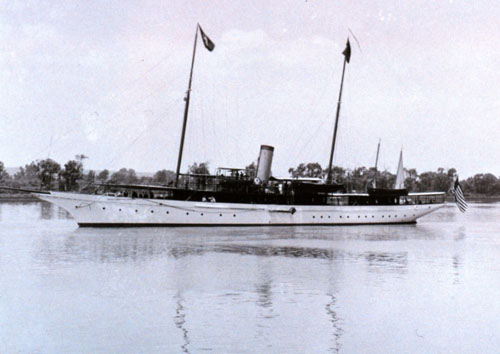
- USC&GS Isis in the Potomac River, ca. 1916

History

United States
- Name: Isis
- Namesake: Isis, an ancient Egyptian goddess who originated the arts and agriculture and symbolized fertility (previous name retained)
- Builder: Marvel's Yard, Newburgh, New York; Fitted out at Fletcher's Shipyard, Hoboken, New Jersey
- Launched: 10 December 1901
- Sponsored by: Mrs. H. P. King
- Completed: 1902
- Acquired: 1 July 1915
- In service: 1915
- Out of service: 24 September 1917 (transferred to U.S. Navy)
- Reinstated: 30 April 1919 (returned by U.S. Navy)
- Fate: Wrecked January 1920
- Notes: Operated as private yacht Isis 1902–1915 and as U.S. Navy patrol vessel USS Isis 1917–1919

General characteristics
- Type: Survey ship
- Displacement: 555 tons
- Length: 180.4 ft (55.0 m)
- Beam: 24.8 ft (7.6 m)
- Draft: 11.7 ft (3.6 m)
- Propulsion: Two triple-expansion steam engines, two shafts
- Speed: 16 knots
- Crew: 8 officers, 44 men

USC&GS Isis was a survey ship that served in the United States Coast and Geodetic Survey from 1915 to 1917 and from 1919 to 1920.

== Construction ==
Isis was built as a private yacht of the same name for William S. and John T. Spaulding of Boston, Massachusetts, by Marvel's Yard at Newburgh, New York and launched on 10 December 1901. She was fitted out at Fletcher's Shipyard at Hoboken, New Jersey, and completed in 1902.

Isis was a steel steamer, 377 gross tons, 256 net tons, with a length of 180.4 feet, beam of 24.8 feet and 11.7 foot draft. She had an indicated horsepower of 2,000 for a speed of 16 knots with capacity for 120 tons of coal with a complement of eight officers and forty-four men. Isis was assigned the official number 100758 and the signal letters KRNJ.

== Spaulding yacht ==
The Spaulding family home was at 99 Beacon Street in Boston but the country estate, Sunset Rock, at Prides Crossing overlooked the anchorage for the family yacht. (Note: Isis seen anchored in photo, LIFE, November 1, 1948 reference.) John Spaulding steamed to the city several times a week. Isis also cruised the Mediterranean and Adriatic.

== Coast and Geodetic Survey career, 1915–1917 ==
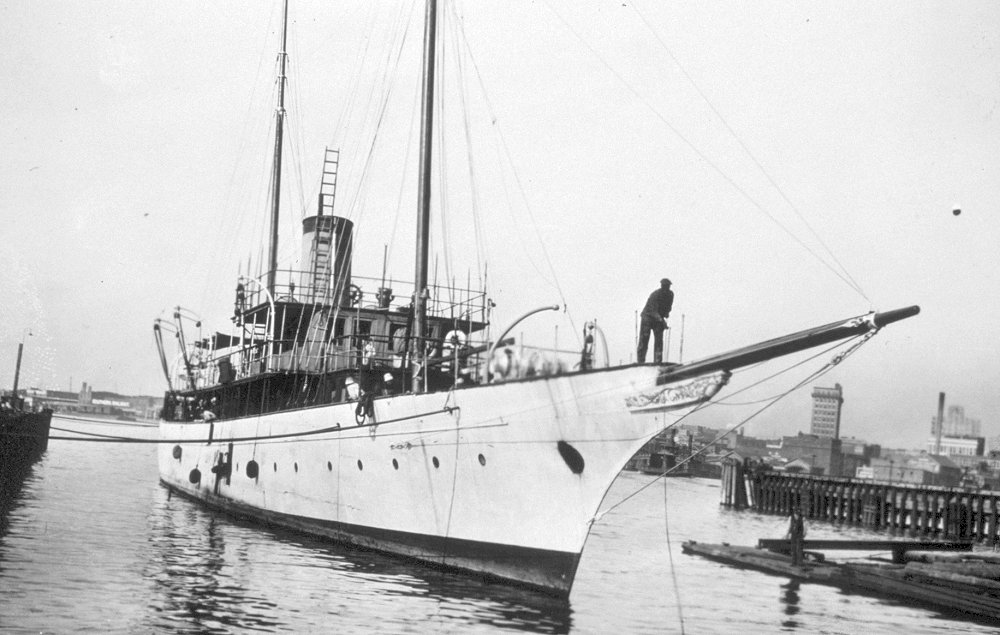
USC&GS Isis at Norfolk, Virginia, ca. 1916.

The Coast and Geodetic Survey acquired her from her owners on 1 July 1915 and placed her in service as a survey ship that year.

She operated along the United States East Coast, used by Ernest Lester Jones—Director of the Coast and Geodetic Survey from 1915 to 1929—to ferry dignitaries about in addition to her hydrographic survey work.

On more than once occasion, Isis assisted mariners in distress. On 28 April 1916, she assisted the launch North Star, which was swamping because of being overloaded in a light choppy sea, in Charleston Harbor off Charleston, South Carolina. On 18 February 1917, she aided to the yacht Soncy at Savannah, Georgia, during a fire on the waterfront. On 28 April 1917, her officers and crew helped to put out a fire on the steam schooner Rosalie Mahoney in the St. Johns River in Florida.

== United States Navy career, 1917–1919 ==
On 24 September 1917, Isis was transferred to the United States Navy for World War I service as the patrol vessel USS Isis

She was commissioned on 4 October 1917 with Lt. Gilbert T. Rude in command. After a minor overhaul, Isis commenced duty as the flagship for the Commander of Squadron 2 Cruiser Force, on 13 November 1917, at Staten Island, New York. She served in that capacity until 14 June 1918, and remained in the New York area until December when she arrived at Naval Station Norfolk. Following operations at Norfolk, she was decommissioned on 30 April 1919 and was returned to the Coast and Geodetic Survey.

== Return to Coast and Geodetic Survey and loss, 1919–1920 ==
Once again USC&GS Isis, she resumed her survey work along the U.S. East Coast. On 20 January 1920 she sank off Crescent Beach, Florida, after striking a submerged obstruction while taking soundings of the sunken dredge Florida to mark the wreck as a navigational hazard.
