= NOAAS Heck =

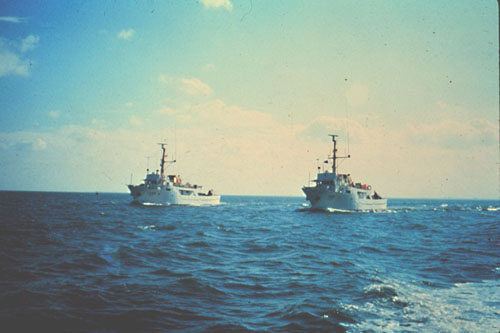
- NOAA Ship RudeSister ships NOAAS Rude (S 590) and NOAAS Heck (S 591)

History

U.S. Coast and Geodetic Survey
- Name: USC&GS Heck (ASV 91)
- Namesake: Captain Nicholas Heck (1882-1953), a U.S. Coast and Geodetic Survey officer
- Builder: Jackobson Shipyard, Oyster Bay, New York
- Launched: 1 November 1966
- Acquired: 11 March 1967 (delivery)
- Commissioned: 29 March 1967
- Fate: Transferred to National Oceanic and Atmospheric Administration 3 October 1970

NOAA
- Name: NOAAS Heck (S 591)
- Namesake: Previous name retained
- Acquired: Transferred from U.S. Coast and Geodetic Survey 3 October 1970
- Decommissioned: 25 October 1995
- Stricken: 1996
- Identification: IMO number: 6727870
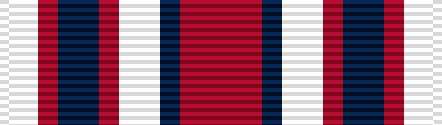
- Honors and awards: Department of Commerce Silver Medal 1978
- Fate: Sold 2001

General characteristics
- Type: Rude-class hydrographic Survey ship S1-MT-71a
- Tonnage: 150 gross register tons (domestic tonnage)
- Displacement: 220 long tons (220 t) (ITC tons)
- Length: 90 ft (27 m)
- Beam: 22 ft (6.7 m) (molded)
- Draft: 7.2 ft (2.2 m)
- Installed power: 850 shaft horsepower (630 kilowatts)
- Propulsion: Two Cummins 425-horsepower (317 kW) geared diesel engines, 2 shafts, 3,900 U.S. gallons (15,000 L) fuel
- Speed: 10 knots (cruising)
- Range: 1,000 nautical miles (1,850 kilometers)
- Endurance: 5 days
- Boats & landing craft carried: One launch
- Complement: 11 (4 NOAA Corps officers, 1 licensed engineer, and 6 other crew members)
- Notes: 120 kilowatts electrical power

NOAAS Heck (S 591) was a Rude-class hydrographic survey ship in the National Oceanic and Atmospheric Administration (NOAA) from 1970 to 1995. Prior to her NOAA service, she was in commission from 1967 to 1970 in the United States Coast and Geodetic Survey as USC&GS Heck (ASV 91).

== Construction and commissioning ==
Heck was built as an "auxiliary survey vessel" (ASV) for the U.S. Coast and Geodetic Survey at the Jackobson Shipyard in Oyster Bay, New York. She was launched on 1 November 1966 and delivered to the Coast and Geodetic Survey on 11 March 1967. She was commissioned on 29 March 1967 as USC&GS Heck (ASV 91). When the Coast and Geodetic Survey merged with other United States Government organizations to form NOAA on 3 October 1970, Heck became part of the NOAA fleet as NOAAS Heck (S 591).

== Capabilities and characteristics ==
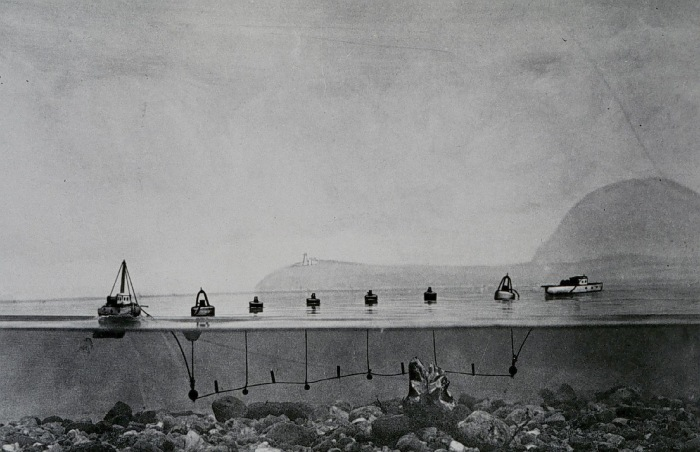
A United States Coast and Geodetic Survey diagram of ca. 1920 of wire-drag hydrographic survey operations as carried out by Rude and her sister ship Heck. The basic principle is to drag a wire attached to two vessels; if the wire encounters an obstruction it will come taut and form a "V".

Heck and her sister ship USC&GS Rude (ASV 90), later NOAAS Rude (S 590), were designed to conduct wire-drag survey operations together, and the Coast and Geodetic Survey acquired them to replace the survey ships USC&GS Hilgard (ASV 82) and USC&GS Wainwright (ASV 83) in that role. Like Hilgard and Wainright before them, Rude and Heck worked together under a single command conducting wire-drag surveys, clearing large swaths between them with a submerged wire. During their careers, however, electronic and acoustic technologies arrived that allowed a single ship to do the same work as two wire-drag vessels, using side-scan sonar or multibeam sonar. As a result, Heck and Rude began to operate independently in 1989, employing the improved technology.

Heck's deck equipment featured one winch and one telescoping boom crane, giving her a lifting capacity of up to 7,500 pounds (3,400 kilograms), as well 500 feet (150 meters) of cable that could pull up to 250 pounds (110 kilograms). She had 11 bunk spaces, and her mess room could seat seven. She was equipped for diving operations to allow human investigation of submerged obstacles. She had a 19-foot (5.8-meter) fiberglass launch for utility or rescue operations.

== Operational history ==
Heck spent her career operating along the United States East Coast and in the Gulf of Mexico.

In 1978, Heck and Rude came to the assistance of the burning research vessel Midnight Sun, rescuing Midnight Sun's crew and scientists and saving the vessel from total loss. Rude's crew took aboard all 20 of Midnight Sun's crew members and scientists, who were afloat in life rafts near Midnight Sun, administered first aid to them, and transported them to shore. Heck's crew, meanwhile, fought the fire aboard Midnight Sun for 20 consecutive hours and saved Midnight Sun from sinking. For their efforts in saving Midnight Sun and her crew, the crews of Rude and Heck received the Department of Commerce Silver Medal in 1978.

Heck was decommissioned on 25 October 1995, stricken in 1996, and sold in 2001.

== Honors and awards ==
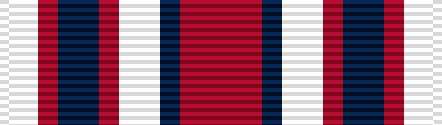
Department of Commerce Silver Medal, 1978

In a ceremony on 23 October 1978 in Washington, D.C., Heck and Rude were awarded the Department of Commerce Silver Medal for "rare and distinguished contributions of major significance to the Department, the nation, and the world." for their assistance to Midnight Sun. The program for the ceremony cited the ships' achievements as follows:

LCDR Robert V. Smart, LTJG Kenneth G. Vadnais, ENS Samuel P. De Bow, Jr., Messrs. William N. Brooks, Johnnie B. Davis, James S. Eamons, Kenneth M. Jones, Frank Krusz, Jr., Anthony W. Styron, and Eijah J. Willis of the NOAA Ship RUDE and LCDR Thomas W. Ruszala, LTJG Charles E. Gross, and Messrs. Mark Aldridge, Horace B. Harris, Charles J. Gentilcore, Dennis S. Brickhouse, Robert T. Lindton, Arnold K. Pedersen, Joseph Wiggins, and James P. Taylor of the NOAA Ship HECK are recognized for rescuing the crew and scientists from the burning vessel M/V MIDNIGHT SUN and saving the vessel from total loss. The crew of the NOAA Ship RUDE safely took aboard all 20 crew members of the burning vessel who were afloat in life rafts near the vessel. First aid was administered, and the crew members of the disabled ship were transported safely to shore. The crew of the NOAA Ship HECK displayed outstanding seamanship through their efforts over 20 consecutive hours to fight the fire. The actions of the two ships' crew members demonstrated superior performance and exceptional courage in a maritime emergency beyond the call of duty.

== See also ==
NOAA ships and aircraft
