= USS PGM-2 =

Gunboat of the United States Navy

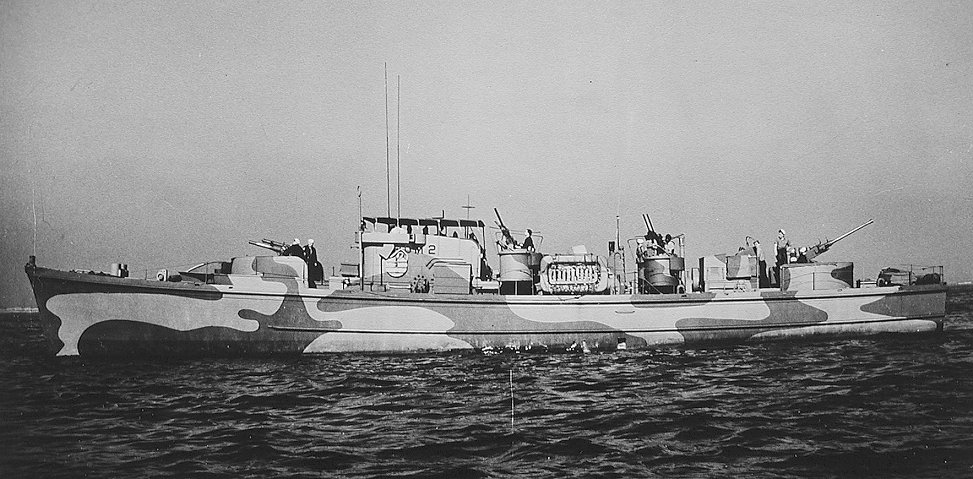
- USS PGM-2

History

United States
- Builder: Robinson Marine, Benton Harbor, Michigan
- Laid down: 16 July 1942
- Launched: 17 June 1943
- Commissioned: 12 August 1943
- Renamed: 10 December 1943
- Reclassified: 10 December 1943
- Stricken: June 1946
- Fate: Unknown

General characteristics
- Class & type: PGM-1/SC-497
- Displacement: 95 tons
- Length: 110 ft 10 in (33.78 m)
- Beam: 23 ft (7.0 m)
- Draft: 10 ft 10 in (3.30 m)
- Propulsion: 2 × Electro-Motive Corporation 16‑184A diesel engines, 1,540 bhp (1,148 kW); 2 × shafts
- Speed: 21 knots (24 mph; 39 km/h)
- Complement: 28
- Armament: 1 × 3"/23 dual purpose gun mount; 1 × 40 mm guns; 8 × twin .50 cal (12.7 mm) machine guns

USS PGM-2 was a PGM-1 class motor gunboat that served in the United States Navy during World War II. She was originally laid down as an SC-497 class submarine chaser on 16 July 1942 by the Robinson Marine in Benton Harbor, Michigan, and launched on 17 June 1943. She was commissioned as USS SC-757 on 12 August 1943. She was later converted to a PGM-1 class motor gunboat and renamed PGM-2 on 10 December 1943. After the war, she was sold and transferred to the Foreign Liquidations Commission at Subic Bay, Philippines on 20 May 1947. Her exact fate is unknown.

== See also ==
- Other ships built by Robinson Marine in Benton Harbor, Michigan:

- USC&GS Hilgard (ASV 82)
- USC&GS Wainwright (ASV 83)
