= USC&GS Hilgard =

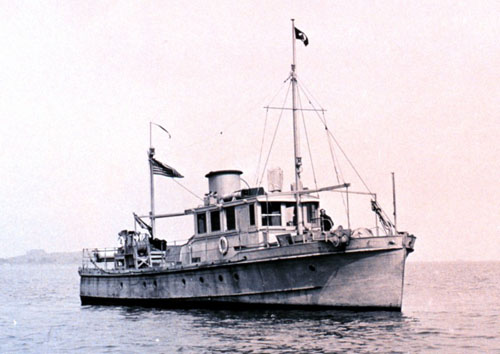
- USC&GS Hilgard (ASV 82)

History

United States
- Name: USC&GS Hilgard (ASV 82)
- Namesake: Julius Erasmus Hilgard (1825-1890), fifth superintendent of the U.S. Coast and Geodetic Survey (1881-1885)
- Builder: Robinson Marine, Benton Harbor, Michigan
- Completed: 1942
- In service: 1942
- Out of service: 1967

General characteristics
- Type: Survey ship
- Length: 66 ft (20 m)
- Beam: 14 ft 8 in (4.47 m)
- Draft: 3 ft 5 in (1.04 m)
- Propulsion: Twin diesel engines

USC&GS Hilgard (ASV 82). was a survey ship that served in the United States Coast and Geodetic Survey from 1942 to 1967.

Hilgard was built as an "auxiliary survey vessel" (ASV) for the Coast and Geodetic Survey by Robinson Marine at Benton Harbor, Michigan, in 1942.

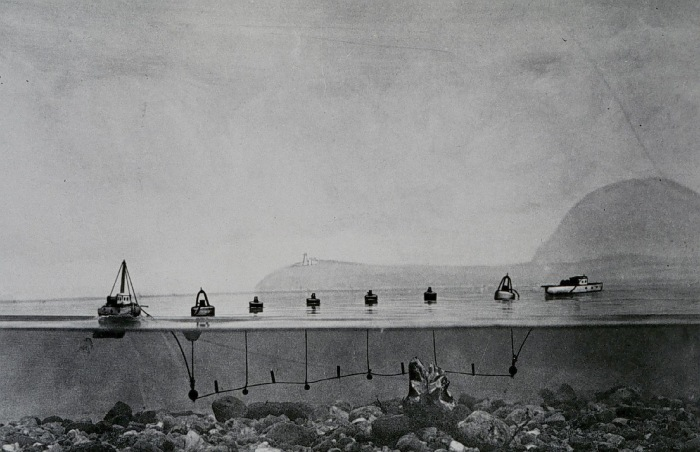
A United States Coast and Geodetic Survey diagram of ca. 1920 of wire-drag hydrographic survey operations as carried out by Hilgard and her sister ship USC&GS Wainwright (ASV 83). The basic principle is to drag a wire attached to two vessels; if the wire encounters an obstruction it will come taut and form a "V."

Hilgard and her sister ship USC&GS Wainwright (ASV 83) conducted wire-drag hydrographic survey operations together along the United States East Coast until 1967, when they were replaced by USC&GS Rude (ASV 90), which later became NOAAS Rude (S 590), and USC&GS Heck (ASV 91), which later became NOAAS Heck (S 591).

== See also ==
- Other ships built by Robinson Marine in Benton Harbor, Michigan:

- USS PGM-2
- USC&GS Wainwright (ASV 83)
