= USC&GS Wainwright =

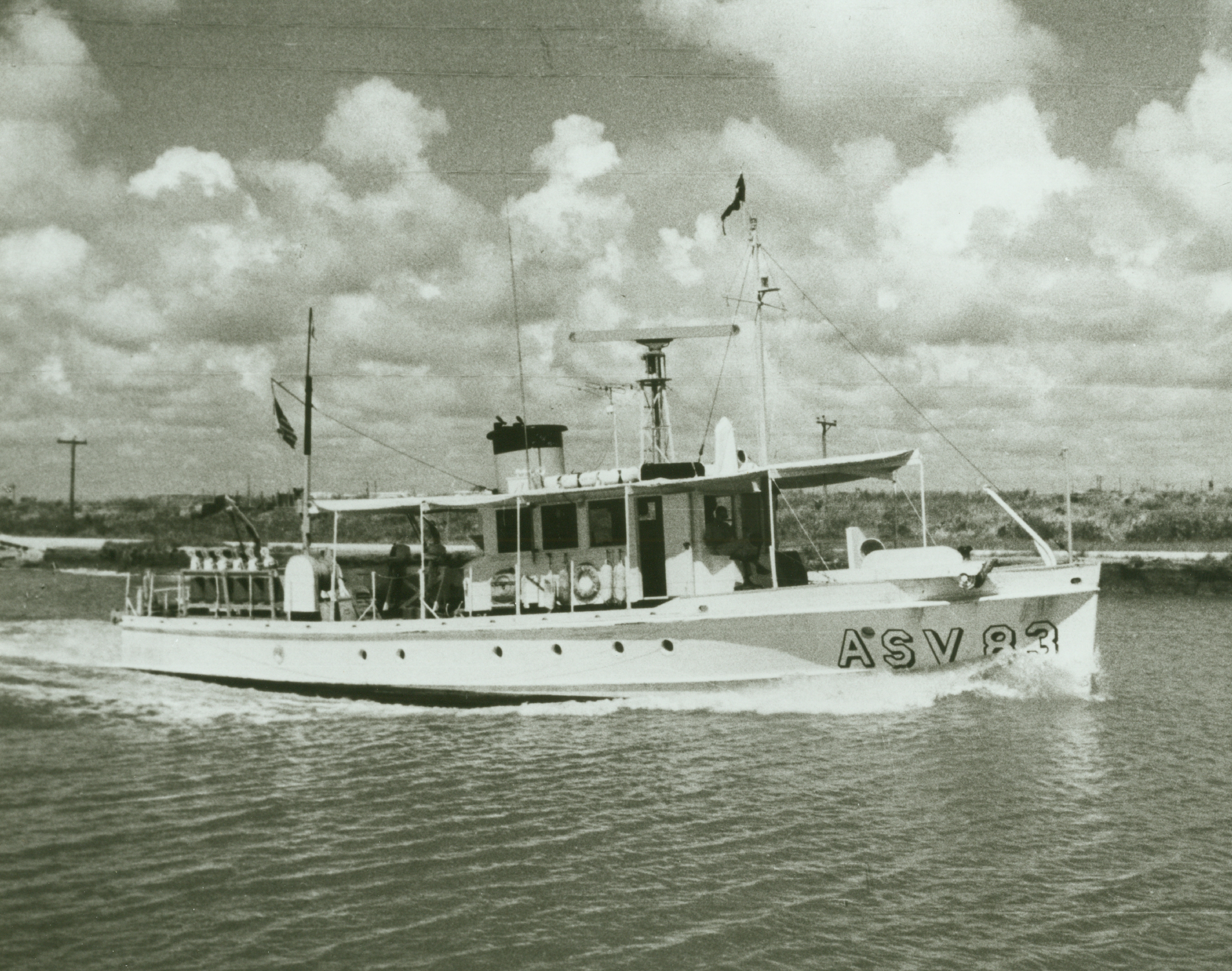
- USC&GS Wainwright (ASV 83), ca. 1965. She is painted in the colors of the Environmental Science Services Administration (ESSA), the United States Coast and Geodetic Survey's parent organization from 1965 to 1970.

History

United States
- Name: USC&GS Wainwright (ASV 83)
- Builder: Robinson Marine, Benton Harbor, Michigan
- Completed: 1942
- Commissioned: 1942
- Decommissioned: 1967

General characteristics
- Type: Survey ship
- Length: 66 ft (20 m)
- Beam: 14 ft 8 in (4.47 m)
- Draft: 3 ft 5 in (1.04 m)
- Propulsion: Twin diesel engines

USC&GS Wainwright (ASV 83). was a survey ship in commission in the United States Coast and Geodetic Survey from 1942 to 1967.

Wainwright was built as an "auxiliary survey vessel" (ASV) for the Coast and Geodetic Survey by Robinson Marine at Benton Harbor, Michigan, in 1942.

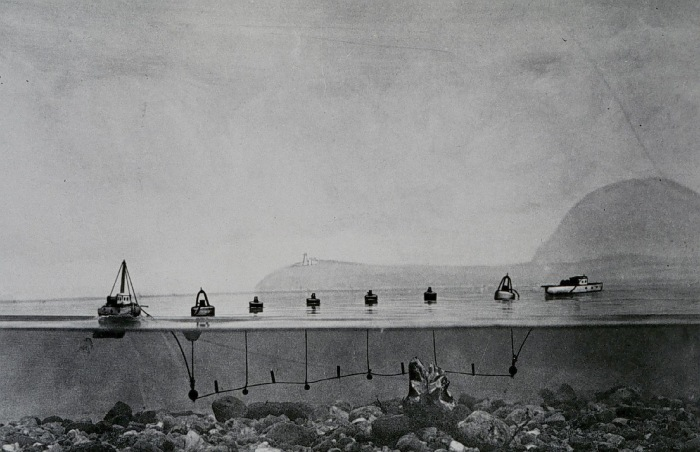
A United States Coast and Geodetic Survey diagram of ca. 1920 of wire drag hydrographic survey operations as carried out by Wainwright and her sister ship Hilgard. The basic principle is to drag a wire attached to two vessels; if the wire encounters an obstruction it will come taut and form a "V."

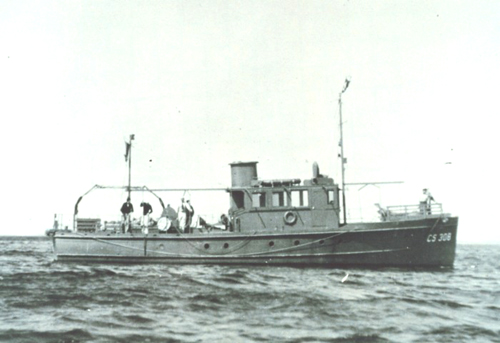
USC&GS Wainwright conducting wire-drag survey operations.

Wainwright and her sister ship USC&GS Hilgard (ASV 82) conducted wire-drag hydrographic survey operations together along the United States East Coast until 1967, when they were replaced by USC&GS Rude (ASV 90), which later became NOAAS Rude (S 590), and USC&GS Heck (ASV 91), which later became NOAAS Heck (S 591).

== See also ==
- Other ships built by Robinson Marine in Benton Harbor, Michigan:

- USC&GS Hilgard (ASV 82)
- USS PGM-2
