= NOAAS Rude =

Research ship built in 1967

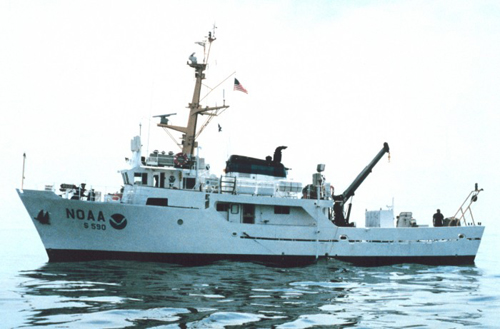
- NOAAS Rude (S 590)

History

U.S. Coast and Geodetic Survey
- Name: USC&GS Rude (ASV 90)
- Namesake: Captain Gilbert T. Rude (1881-1962), a U.S. Coast and Geodetic Survey Commissioned Corps officer
- Builder: Jackobson Shipyard, Oyster Bay, New York
- Launched: 17 August 1966
- Completed: December 1966
- Commissioned: 29 March 1967
- Fate: Transferred to National Oceanic and Atmospheric Administration 3 October 1970

National Oceanic and Atmospheric Administration
- Name: NOAAS Rude (S 590)
- Namesake: Previous name retained
- Acquired: Transferred from U.S. Coast and Geodetic Survey 3 October 1970
- Decommissioned: 25 March 2008
- Identification: IMO number: 6728185
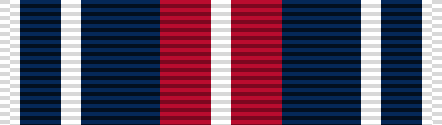
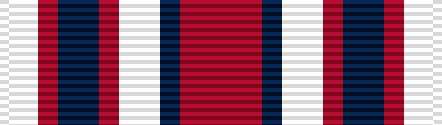
- Honors and awards: Department of Commerce Gold Medal 1996; Department of Commerce Silver Medal 1978
- Fate: Transferred to U.S. Environmental Protection Agency August 2008

U.S. Environmental Protection Agency
- Name: US EPA Lake Explorer II
- Acquired: Transferred from NOAA August 2008
- In service: 1 October 2009
- Home port: Duluth, Minnesota
- Identification: IMO number: 6728185

General characteristics
- Class & type: S1-MT-71a
- Type: Rude-class hydrographic survey ship
- Tonnage: 150 gross register tons (domestic tonnage)
- Displacement: 220 tons (ITC tons)
- Length: 90 ft (27 m)
- Beam: 22 ft (6.7 m) (moulded)
- Draft: 7.2 ft (2.2 m)
- Installed power: 850 shp (0.63 MW)
- Propulsion: Two Cummins 425 hp (0.317 MW) geared diesel engines, 2 shafts, 3,900 US gallons (15,000 L) fuel
- Speed: 10 knots (19 km/h) (cruising)
- Range: 1,000 nautical miles (1,900 km)
- Endurance: 5 days
- Boats & landing craft carried: One launch
- Complement: 11 (4 NOAA Corps officers, 1 licensed engineer, and 6 other crew members)
- Notes: 120 kilowatts electrical power

NOAAS Rude (S 590) was an American Rude-class hydrographic survey ship that was in commission in the National Oceanic and Atmospheric Administration (NOAA) from 1970 to 2008. Prior to her NOAA career, she was in commission in the United States Coast and Geodetic Survey from 1967 to 1970 as USC&GS Rude (ASV 90). She was named for Gilbert T. Rude, former Chief of the Division of Coastal Surveys of the Coast and Geodetic Survey.

In 2008, NOAA decommissioned Rude and transferred her to the United States Environmental Protection Agency (EPA). Renamed US EPA Lake Explorer II, she entered EPA service as a research ship in 2009.

== USC&GS and NOAA ==
=== Construction and commissioning ===
Rude (pronounced "Rudy") was built as an "auxiliary survey vessel" (ASV) for the U.S. Coast and Geodetic Survey at the Jackobson Shipyard in Oyster Bay, New York. She was launched on 17 August 1966 and commissioned into Coast and Geodetic Survey service on 29 March 1967 as USC&GS Rude (ASV 90). When the Coast and Geodetic Survey merged with other United States Government organizations to form NOAA on 3 October 1970, she became a part of the NOAA fleet as NOAAS Rude (S 590).

=== Technical details ===
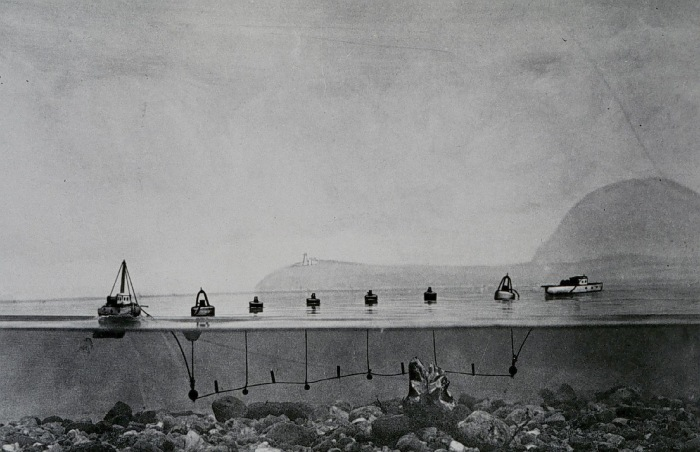
A United States Coast and Geodetic Survey diagram of ca. 1920 of wire-drag hydrographic survey operations as carried out by Rude and her sister ship NOAAS Heck (S 591).The basic principle is to drag a wire attached to two vessels; if the wire encounters an obstruction it will come taut and form a "V."

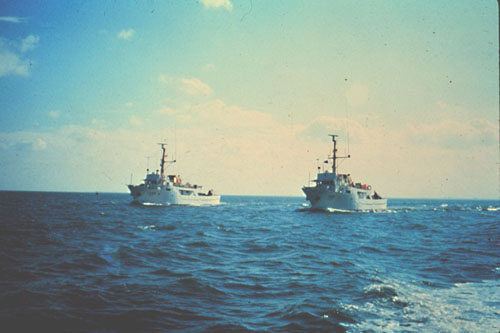
Rude (left) worked with its sister ship NOAAS Heck (S 591) (right) on wire drag operations until 1989.

Rude′s hull was 90 feet (27 m) long, the smallest in the NOAA fleet. She had a total of 11 bunk spaces. The ship's mess room could seat seven. She carried a complement of four NOAA Corps officers and seven other crew members, including one licensed engineer.

Rude′s deck equipment featured one winch and one telescoping boom crane. This equipment gave Rude a lifting capacity of up to 7,500 pounds (3,402 kg). She also had 500 feet (150 meters) of cable that could pull up to 250 pounds (110 kg).

For her primary mission of inshore hydrographic surveys, Rude had a differential global positioning system (DGPS), a multibeam sonar system, and side-scan sonar (SSS). She also was equipped for diving operations to allow direct human investigation of submerged obstacles. She had a 19-foot (5.8 m) fiberglass launch for utility or rescue operations.

=== Operations ===
The Coast and Geodetic Survey acquired Rude and a sister ship of identical design, USC&GS Heck (ASV 91), later NOAAS Heck (S 591), to conduct wire-drag survey operations together, replacing the survey ships USC&GS Hilgard (ASV 82) and USC&GS Wainwright (ASV 83) in that role. Like Hilgard and Wainright before them, Rude and Heck worked together under a single command conducting wire drag surveys, clearing large swaths between them with a submerged wire.

In 1978, Rude and Heck came to the assistance of the burning research vessel Midnight Sun, rescuing Midnight Sun′s crew and scientists and saving the vessel from total loss. Rude′s crew took aboard all 20 of Midnight Sun's crew members and scientists, who were afloat in life rafts near Midnight Sun, administered first aid to them, and transported them to shore. Heck's crew, meanwhile, fought the fire aboard Midnight Sun for 20 consecutive hours and saved Midnight Sun from sinking. For their efforts in saving Midnight Sun and her crew, the crews of Rude and Heck received the Department of Commerce Silver Medal in 1978.

Electronic technologies eventually arrived that allow a single vessel to do the same surveying work using sidescan and multibeam sonar that formerly required two vessels working together using the wire-drag technique. In 1989, Rude and Heck began working independently thanks to the improved technology, and Heck was decommissioned in 1995 and sold in 2001.

Rude remained in commission and was sometimes called upon to assist the United States Coast Guard and United States Navy in search, rescue, and recovery operations. She located the wreckage of TWA Flight 800 on the bottom of the Atlantic Ocean south of Long Island off Moriches, New York, in July 1996, receiving a Department of Commerce Gold Medal that year for her efforts.

After receiving word that the Piper Saratoga II HP flown by John F. Kennedy Jr. had disappeared during a flight on the evening of 16 July 1999 and was feared to have crashed in the Atlantic Ocean off Martha's Vineyard, Massachusetts, Rude began searching for the wreckage of the aircraft on 17 July using sidescan sonar and multibeam sonar. The NOAA survey ship NOAAS Whiting arrived on the scene on the morning of 19 July and joined Rude in search efforts, employing a more advanced sidescan sonar than the one aboard Rude, giving Whiting a higher resolution and a higher search speed. While Whiting searched one area in dense fog, dodging lobster pots, Rude found and marked a high-confidence target in another area that appeared to be the missing Saratoga and radioed the United States Navy rescue and salvage ship USS Grasp (ARS-51) about the discovery; Whiting then searched the same area to gain higher-resolution images of the target. Late on 20 July, U.S. Navy divers from Grasp confirmed that the target was the missing aircraft. Whiting and Rude competed their survey of the crash area on 21 July, then assisted the United States Coast Guard in maintaining security in the area. Later on 21 July, the two ships were released from duty in the crash area and departed. On 30 July 1999, the U.S. Coast Guard presented personnel involved in the search-and-rescue effort, including the crews of Rude and Whiting, with a commendation

... for exceptionally meritorious service from 17 July 1999 to 23 July 1999 in the search and recovery of the downed aircraft carrying John F. Kennedy, Jr.; his wife, Carolyn Bessette-Kennedy; and her sister Lauren Bessette. Members of the Unified Command distinguished themselves during this complex operation with their professional expertise and poise.

Rude was decommissioned on 25 March 2008 and placed in reserve in NOAA′s Atlantic Fleet.

=== Honors and awards ===
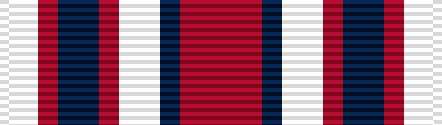
Department of Commerce Silver Medal, 1978

In a ceremony on 23 October 1978 in Washington, D.C., Rude and Heck were awarded the Department of Commerce Silver Medal for "rare and distinguished contributions of major significance to the Department, the nation, and the world." for their assistance to Midnight Sun. The program for the ceremony cited the ships' achievements as follows:

LCDR Robert V. Smart, LTJG Kenneth G. Vadnais, ENS Samuel P. De Bow, Jr., Messrs. William N. Brooks, Johnnie B. Davis, James S. Eamons, Kenneth M. Jones, Frank Krusz, Jr., Anthony W. Styron, and Eijah J. Willis of the NOAA Ship RUDE and LCDR Thomas W. Ruszala, LTJG Charles E. Gross, and Messrs. Mark Aldridge, Horace B. Harris, Charles J. Gentilcore, Dennis S. Brickhouse, Robert T. Lindton, Arnold K. Pedersen, Joseph Wiggins, and James P. Taylor of the NOAA Ship HECK are recognized for rescuing the crew and scientists from the burning vessel M/V MIDNIGHT SUN and saving the vessel from total loss. The crew of the NOAA Ship RUDE safely took aboard all 20 crew members of the burning vessel who were afloat in life rafts near the vessel. First aid was administered, and the crew members of the disabled ship were transported safely to shore. The crew of the NOAA Ship HECK displayed outstanding seamanship through their efforts over 20 consecutive hours to fight the fire. The actions of the two ships' crew members demonstrated superior performance and exceptional courage in a maritime emergency beyond the call of duty.

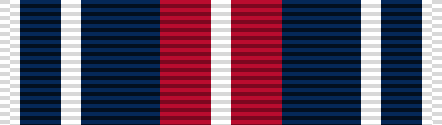
Department of Commerce Gold Medal 1996

In a ceremony on 4 December 1996 in Washington, D.C., Rude was awarded the Department of Commerce Gold Medal for "rare and distinguished contributions of major significance to the Department, the nation, and the world." for its response as a part of the NOAA TWA Flight 800 Disaster Response Team. The program for the ceremony cited the team's achievements as follows:

The NOAA TWA Flight 800 Disaster Response Team is recognized for their crucial role in providing precise map mosaics of the Atlantic Ocean debris fields off Long Island, New York. The mosaics were instrumental in victim recovery, salvage and investigative efforts. Within hours after the disaster, the NOAA team arrived on the site and began surveying the ocean floor with highly sophisticated side scan sonar equipment. The team utilized the sonar data to produce precisely located graphic descriptions of the debris fields. Without the products and services provided by the response team, the recovery of the victims and the wreckage would have been a nearly impossible task.

== Environmental Protection Agency ==
=== Acquisition ===
In August 2008, NOAA transferred the ship to the United States Environmental Protection Agency (EPA) at the NOAA Marine Operations Base at Norfolk, Virginia. The EPA renamed her UIS EPA Lake Explorer II and earmarked her for environmental research operations on the Great Lakes.

=== Conversion ===
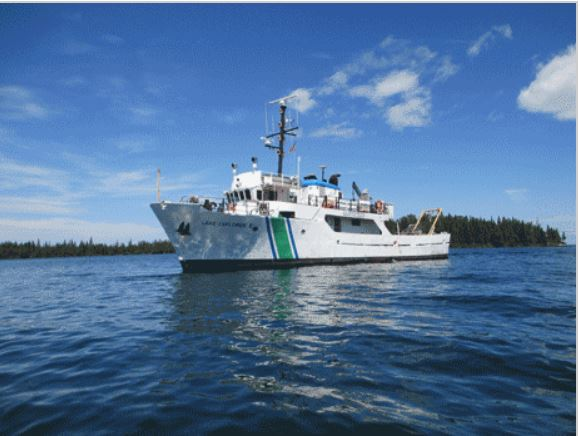
US EPA Lake Explorer II in 2008 or 2009.

After acquiring Lake Explorer II, the EPA converted it for use as a research vessel. The EPA retained all of the ship's navigation equipment, her A-frame, and her accommodations of 11 bunks located in four double staterooms and one triple stateroom. However, the EPA removed all of her NOAA science equipment and installed new equipment appropriate to her new environmental research role, including a winch and an additional frame.

On 22 September 2008, while Lake Explorer II was moored in the Elizabeth River at the NOAA Marine Operations Base at Norfolk, still without her new name painted on her side, she suffered a fracture in a stern tube which ran through her center fuel tank, causing her to spill an estimated 1,400 U.S. gallons (5,300 liters) of diesel fuel into the river. Her crew contained the leak, and a combined effort by the U.S. Coast Guard, Norfolk Fire Department, Virginia Department of Environmental Quality, and an oil spill response organization the EPA hired contained and cleaned up the spill.

During the summer of 2009, Lake Explorer II was hauled out of the water at a shipyard in Portsmouth, Virginia, for upgrades to her structural components. A major part of this phase of her conversion was the installation of a new tank to hold all sewage generated aboard the ship to ensure her compliance with strict zero-discharge standards for sewage on the Great Lakes. While she was out of the water at Portsmouth, the shipyard also replaced shaft tubes, replaced or rebuilt sea valves, painted her bottom with new anti-foul paint, and conducted a routine out-of-water inspection of her equipment and hull.

In EPA service, the ship has a crew of four – a captain, first mate, chief engineer, and first engineer – and can embark up to seven scientists.

=== Operations ===
On 1 October 2009, with the conversion complete, Lake Explorer II and her crew departed the NOAA Marine Operations Base at Norfolk and, after a two-day transit in Atlantic Ocean waters, arrived in New York Harbor on 3 October 2009. Following a stay at New York City, the ship proceeded up the Hudson River to Albany, New York, where she entered the New York State Canal System. Over the course of four days, she navigated the Erie Canal and Oswego Canal, passing through 30 locks, before entering Lake Ontario at Oswego, New York. Lake Explorer II then crossed Lake Ontario, Lake Erie, Lake Huron, and Lake Superior, passing through nine more canal locks along the way, before arriving at her new home port, Duluth, Minnesota, on 16 October 2009, completing a 15-day journey of 1,580 nautical miles (2,926 km; 1,818 mi).

Operated throughout the Great Lakes by the EPA's Mid-Continent Ecology Division, Lake Explorer II conducts research surveys designed to develop a comprehensive environmental assessment of coastal conditions in the Great Lakes and demonstrate a new generation of lakewide assessment designs which include nearshore ecosystems in lakewide assessment. Her work includes the use of advanced technologies for sampling aquatic life, water quality, and sediments, including the deployment of advanced in situ environmental sensing system packages, which make continuous synoptic maps of water and plankton properties, allowing for greater efficiency during extensive research surveys.

After being hauled out of the water for drydocking, upgrades, and the design, fabrication, and installation of a new bulbous bow at Great Lakes Shipyard in Cleveland, Ohio, Lake Explorer II was relaunched on 27 October 2014. She got underway to return to Duluth on 28 October 2014.

== See also ==
NOAA ships and aircraft
