= Radio acoustic ranging =

Method of accurately determining a ship's position

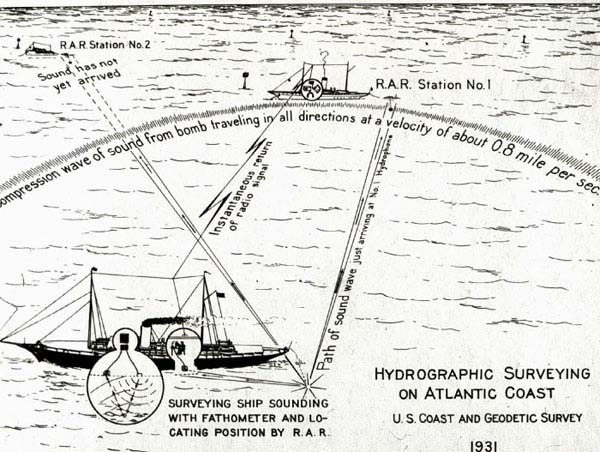
A 1931 U.S. Coast and Geodetic Survey illustration of radio acoustic ranging using anchored station ships.

Radio acoustic ranging (RAR), occasionally written as "radio-acoustic ranging", was a method for determining a ship's precise location at sea by detonating an explosive charge underwater near the ship, detecting the arrival of the underwater sound waves at remote locations, and radioing the time of arrival of the sound waves at the remote stations to the ship, allowing the ship's crew to use true range multilateration to determine the ship's position. Developed by the United States Coast and Geodetic Survey (USC&GS) in 1923 and 1924 for use in accurately fixing the position of survey ships during hydrographic survey operations, it was the first navigation technique in human history other than dead reckoning that did not require visual observation of a landmark, marker, light, or celestial body, and the first non-visual means to provide precise positions. First employed operationally in 1924, RAR remained in use until 1944, when new radio navigation techniques developed during World War II rendered it obsolete.

== Technique ==
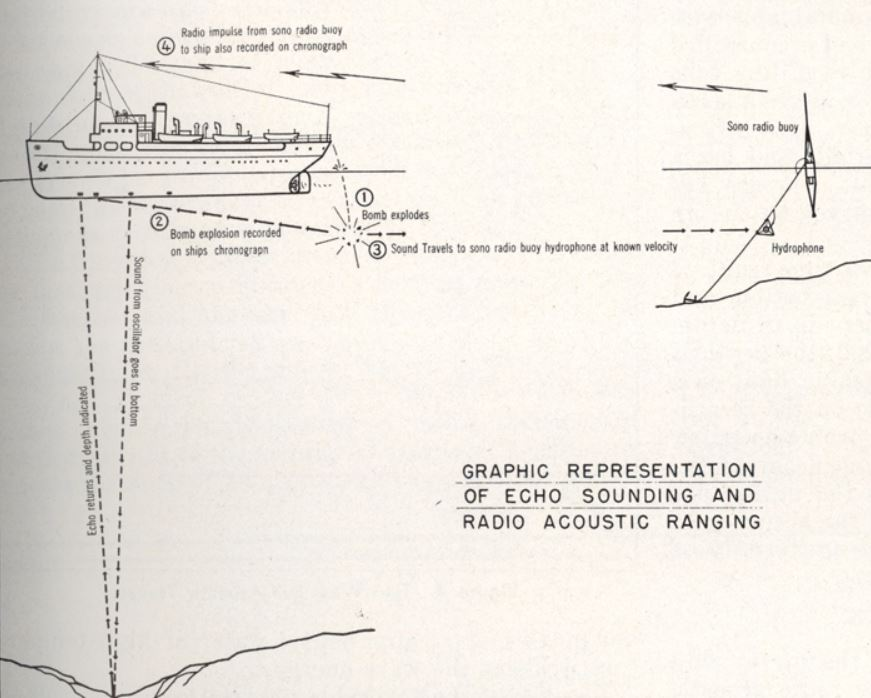
A USC&GS survey illustration of RAR and echo sounding techniques used in combination.

To fix their position using radio acoustic ranging, a ship's crew first ascertained the temperature and salinity of sea water in the vicinity of the ship to determine an accurate velocity of sound through the water. The crew then threw a small TNT bomb off the ship's stern. It exploded at a depth of about 100 feet (30 meters), and a chronograph aboard the ship automatically recorded the time the explosion was heard at the ship. The sound traveled outward from the explosion, eventually reaching hydrophones at known locations – shore stations, anchored station ships, or moored buoys – at a distance from the ship. Each hydrophone was connected to a radio transmitter that automatically sent a signal indicating the time its hydrophone detected the sound. At the distances involved – generally less than 200 nautical miles (370 km) – each of these radio signals arrived at the ship at essentially the same instant that each of the remote hydrophones detected the sound of the explosion. The ship's chronograph automatically recorded the time each radio signal arrived at the ship. By subtracting the time of the explosion from the time of radio signal reception, the ship's crew could determine the length of time the sound wave required to travel from the point of the explosion to each remote hydrophone and, knowing the speed of sound in the surrounding sea water, could multiply the sound's travel time by the velocity of sound in sea water to determine the distance between the explosion and the hydrophone. By determining the distance to at least two remote hydrophones in known locations, the ship's crew could use true range multilateration to fix the ship's position.

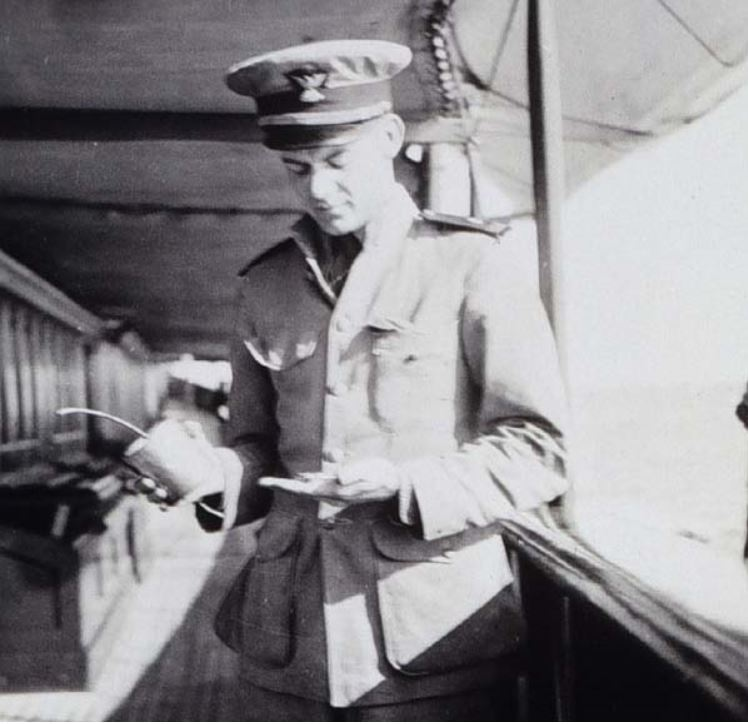
A USC&GS officer aboard a survey ship prepares a bomb for use in RAR during hydrographic survey operations

In deep waters, such as those that prevailed in the Pacific Ocean along the United States West Coast, the U.S. Coast and Geodetic Survey could rely upon shore stations to support RAR because the deep water allowed sound to travel to the coast. Along the U.S. East Coast, where shallower waters prevailed, sound had greater difficulty in reaching the coast, and the USC&GS relied more heavily on anchored station ships, and later moored buoys, to support RAR.

Chronographs recorded times to the hundredth of a second, and the crew of a ship using RAR could determine their ship's distance from the remote hydrophone stations to within 50 feet (15 meters), allowing them to plot their ship's position with great accuracy for the time. With sound waves traveling from the point of the explosion to the distant hydrophones at about 0.8 nautical miles per second (1.5 km/s), ships occasionally used RAR at distances of over 200 nautical miles (370 kilometres) between ship and hydrophone station, and distances of 75 to 100 nautical miles (139 to 185 km) were common.

== Development history ==
=== Precursors ===
RAR had its origins in a growing understanding of underwater acoustics and their practical application during the early decades of the 20th century, and developed in parallel with echo sounding. The first step took place in the early 1900s, when the Submarine Signal Company invented a submarine bell signalling device and a hydrophone that could serve as a receiver of the underwater sounds the bells generated. The crew of a ship equipped with the receiving hydrophone could plot their ship's distance from the submarine bell mechanism and plot intersecting lines from two or more bells to determine the ship's position. The bells were installed at lighthouses, aboard lightvessels, and on buoys along the coasts of North America and Europe, and receiving hydrophones were mounted aboard hundreds of ships. It was history's first practical use of acoustics in an ocean environment.

The sinking of RMS Titanic in 1912 due to a collision with an iceberg spurred the Canadian inventor Reginald Fessenden (1866–1932) to begin work on a long-distance underwater sound transmission and reception system that could detect hazards in the path of a ship. This led to the invention of the Fessenden oscillator, an electro-acoustic transducer which by 1914 had a proven ability to transmit and receive sound at a distance of 31 nautical miles (57 km; 36 mi) across Massachusetts Bay and to detect an iceberg ahead of a ship at a range of 2 nautical miles (3.7 km; 2.3 mi) by bouncing sound off it and detecting the echo, as well as an occasional ability to detect the reflection of sound off the ocean bottom. Further impetus to developing practical applications of underwater acoustics came from World War I, which prompted the Royal Navy, U.S. Navy, and U.S. Army Coast Artillery Corps (CAC) to experiment with sound as a means of detecting submerged submarines. In postwar experiments, the CAC's Subaqueous Sound Ranging Section conducted experiments in shallow water in Vineyard Sound off Massachusetts in which it detonated explosive charges underwater at the ends of established baselines and measured the amount of time it took for the sound to arrive at hydrophones at the other ends of the baselines in order to establish very accurate measurements of the speed of sound through water. And in 1923, the Submarine Signal Company improved upon its underwater signaling devices by equipping them with radio transmitters that sent signals both to identify the particular device and to indicate to approaching ships that it would generate an acoustic signal at a specific time interval after it sent the radio signal, allowing ships to identify the specific navigational aid they were approaching and to take advantage of a one-way ranging capability that let their crews determine their direction and distance from the navigational aid.

=== Nicholas Heck ===
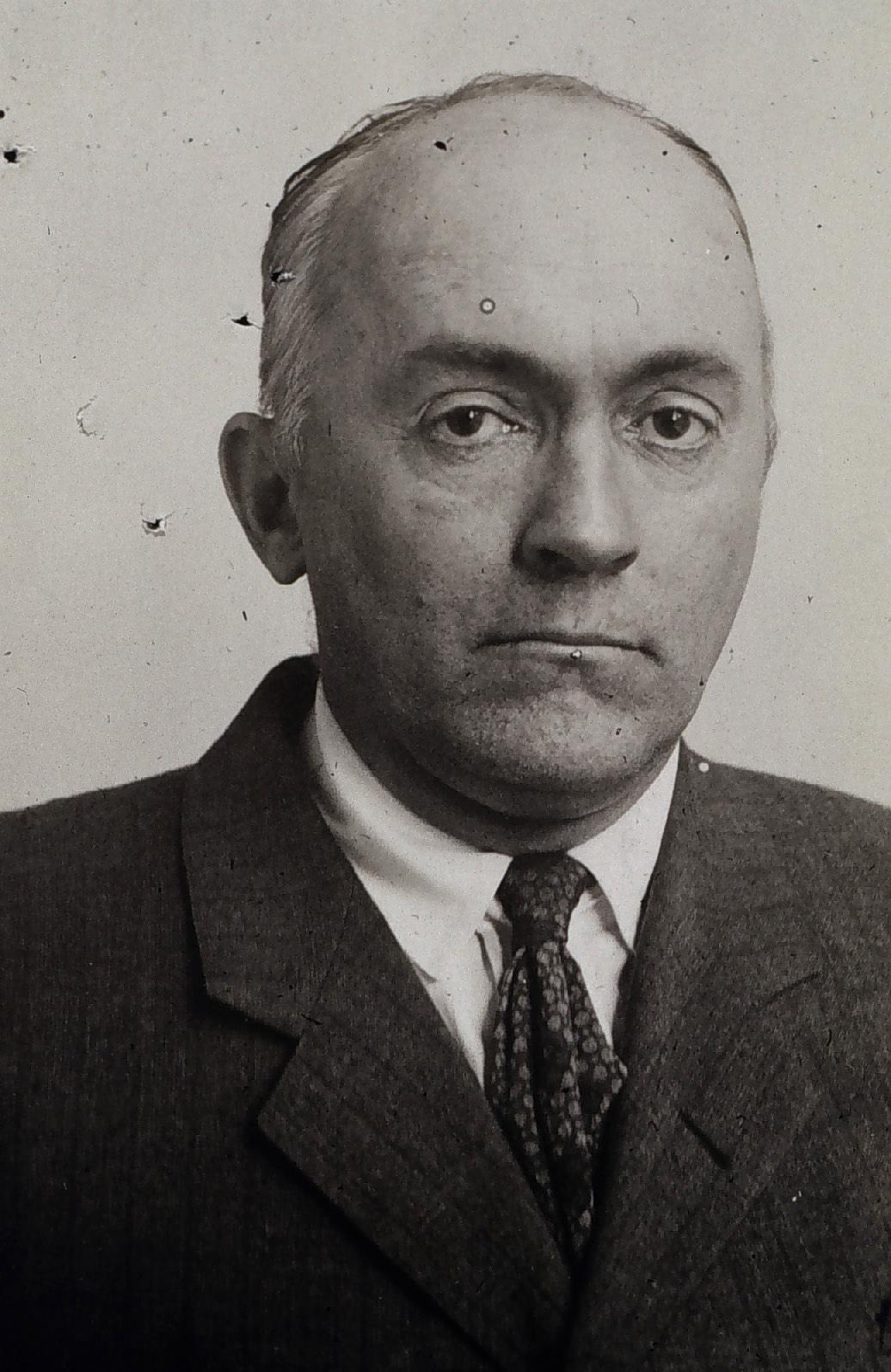
Nicholas H. Heck, ca. 1940.

Realizing the potential of these applications of acoustics to hydrographic surveying and navigation, particularly along the U.S. West Coast, where fog frequently interfered with attempts to fix ship positions accurately, Ernest Lester Jones (1876–1929), then Director of the USC&GS, in consultation with USC&GS Corps officers, decided to investigate the use of acoustics in both depth finding and navigation. Nicholas H. Heck (1882–1953), a USC&GS officer, had been assigned from 1917 to 1919 to World War I service with the U.S. Naval Reserve Force, during which he had researched the use of underwater acoustics in antisubmarine warfare. He was the obvious choice to lead the new effort.

By January 1923, the USC&GS had decided to install a Hayes sonic rangefinder – an early echo sounder – aboard the survey ship USC&GS Guide, which the USC&GS planned to commission into its fleet later that year; successful operation of the sonic rangefinder would require a precise understanding of the speed of sound through water. When Heck contacted E. A. Stephenson of the CAC to inform him of this plan and to inquire further about the Vineyard Sound experiments, Stephenson suggested that a system of hydrophones detecting the sound of underwater explosions could allow USC&GS ships to fix their position while conducting surveys. Heck agreed, but believed that existing navigation aids would not meet the needs of the USC&GS in terms of the immediacy and accuracy of position fixes. He envisioned improving on the Submarine Signal Company's system of underwater noise generators and attached radio transmitters, as well as other previous concepts, by creating what would become known as the RAR method. Like echo sounding, this method required an accurate calculation of the speed of sound through water.

Heck oversaw tests at USC&GS headquarters in Washington, D.C., that demonstrated that shipboard recording of the time of an explosion could be performed accurately enough for his concept to work. He worked with Dr. E. A. Eckhardt, a physicist, and M. Keiser, an electrical engineer, of the National Bureau of Standards to develop a hydrophone system that could automatically send a radio signal when it detected the sound of an underwater explosion. When the USC&GS commissioned Guide in 1923, Heck had her based at New London, Connecticut. Under his direction, Guide both tested her new echo sounder's ability to make accurate depth soundings and conducted RAR experiments in cooperation with the CAC. Despite many difficulties, testing of both echo sounding and RAR wrapped up successfully in November 1923.

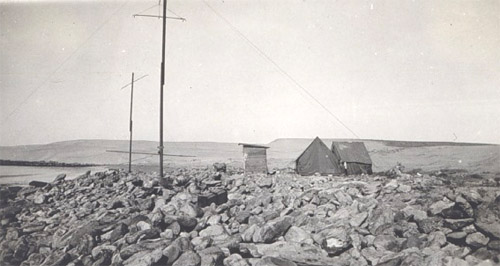
A USC&GS RAR station on California′s San Clemente Island in 1925, when it supported hydrographic survey operations of the USC&GS Guide

=== The cruise of the Guide ===
In late November 1923, with Heck aboard, Guide began a voyage from New London via Puerto Rico and the Panama Canal to San Diego, California, where she would be based in the future, with her route planned to take her over a wide variety of ocean depths so that she could continue to test her echo sounder. Guide made history during the voyage, becoming the first USC&GS ship to use echo sounding to measure and record the depth of the sea at points along her course; she also measured water temperatures and took water samples so that the Scripps Institution for Biological Research (now the Scripps Institution of Oceanography) at La Jolla, California, could measure salinity levels. She also compared echo sounder soundings with those made by lead lines, discovering that using a single speed of sound through water, as had been the previous practice by those conducting echo sounding experiments, yielded acoustic depth-finding results that did not match the depths found by lead lines. Before she reached San Diego in December 1923, she had accumulated much data beneficial to the study of the movement of sound waves through water and measuring their velocity under varying conditions of salinity, density, and temperature, information essential both to depth-finding and RAR.

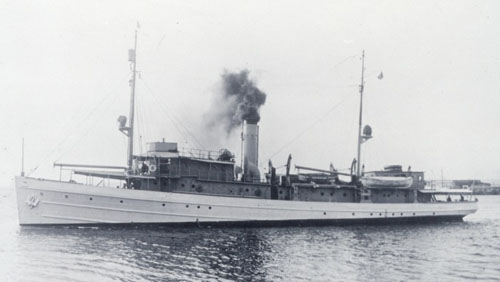
The Guide between 1923 and 1941

Upon arriving in California, Heck and Guide personnel in consultation with the Scripps Institution developed formulas that allowed accurate echo sounding of depths in all but the shallowest waters and installed hydrophones at La Jolla and Oceanside, California, to allow experimentation with RAR. Under Heck's direction, Guide then conducted experiments off the coast of California during the early months of 1924 that demonstrated that accurate echo sounding was possible using the new formulas. Experiments with RAR, despite initial difficulties, demonstrated that the method also was practical, although difficulty with getting some of the explosive charges to detonate hampered some of the experimental program. In April 1924, the USC&GS concluded that both echo sounding and RAR were fundamentally sound, with no foundational problems left to solve, and that all that remained necessary was continued development and refinement of both techniques during their operational use. Heck turned over continued development of echo sounding and RAR to Guide's commanding officer, Commander Robert Luce, and returned to his duties in Washington, D.C.

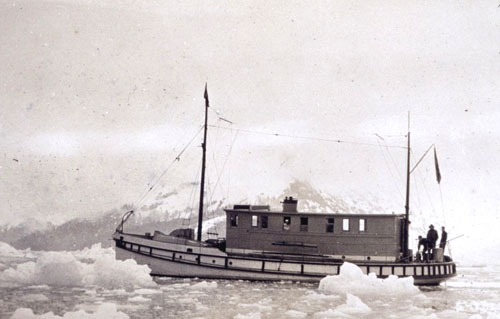
The USC&GS Helianthus, equipped with an antenna wire for RAR operations

=== Later development ===
Operating in the Pacific Ocean off Oregon in 1924, Guide became the first ship to employ RAR operationally. Off Oregon that year, she successfully employed the technique at a distance of 206 nautical miles (382 kilometres) between the ranging explosion and the remote hydrophones detecting its sound and in the process achieved the first observed indication of the ocean sound layer that was later called the sound fixing and ranging (SOFAR) channel or deep sound channel (DSC). In 1928, French investigators extended this range, detonating a 30-kg (66-pound) explosive in the Mediterranean Sea between Algiers in French Algeria and Toulon, France, and detecting the sound at a range of 400 nautical miles (740 kilometres).

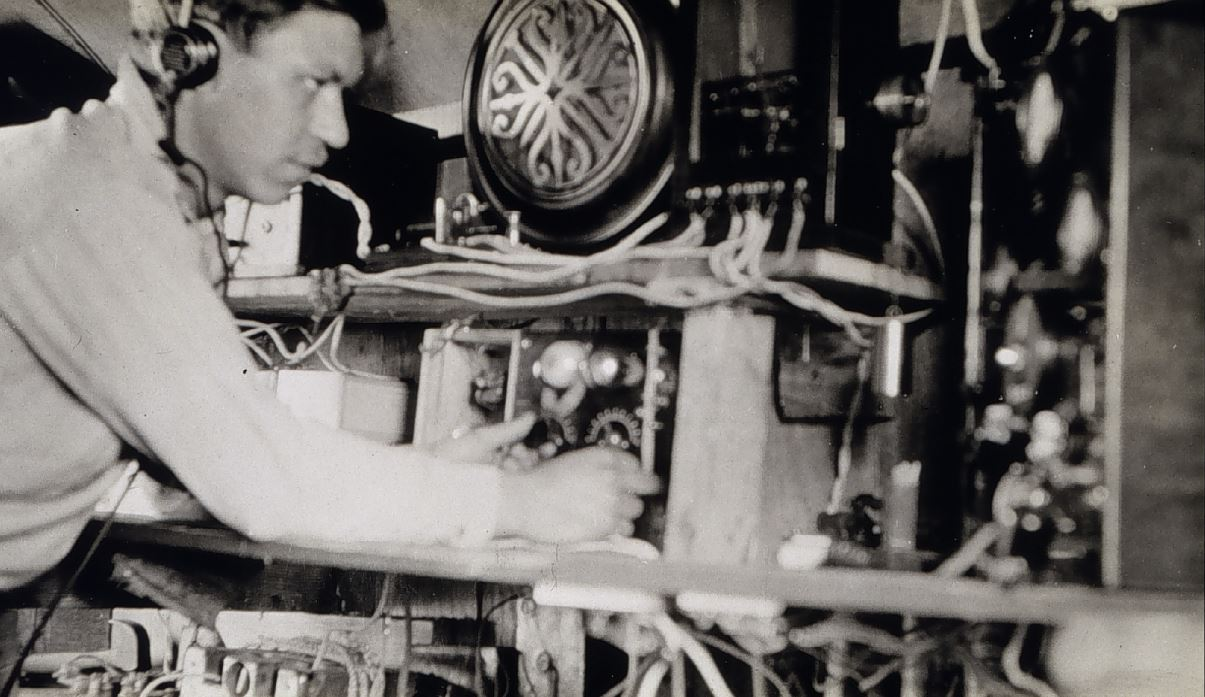
A USC&GS radioman on duty at RAR station KGHS on Kodiak Island, Territory of Alaska, supporting operations of USC&GS Surveyor in 1929.

Initially, Heck and others involved in the development of RAR thought the technique would prove least effective along the coast of the Pacific Northwest, where they assumed that the sound of wave action along the coast and the difficulty of setting up shore stations and cables would reduce the success of RAR; in contrast, they thought that conditions along the East Coast would pose no challenges. In fact, the opposite proved true: Among other problems, the relatively shallow water along the East Coast attenuated the sound of ranging explosions and shoals often blocked the sound from reaching shore at all. To overcome these difficulties, the USC&GS anchored vessels well offshore along the East Coast to serve as hydrophone stations. In 1931, the USC&GS proposed replacing the manned station ships with "radio-sonobuoys", and in July 1936 it began to place radio-sonobuoys in service. The 700-pound (317.5-kg) buoys – equipped with subsurface hydrophones, batteries, and radio transmitters that automatically sent a radio signal when their hydrophones detected the sound of a ranging explosion – could be deployed or recovered by USC&GS ships in five minutes. Use of the buoys spread to the West Coast as well because they were cheaper to set up and operate than a shore station.

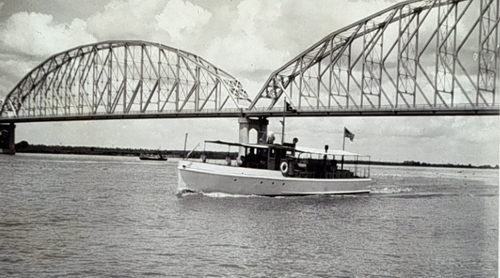
The USC&GS Pratt putting to sea to serve as a hydrophone station ship for the USC&GS Hydrographer in the Gulf of Mexico between 1933 and 1937

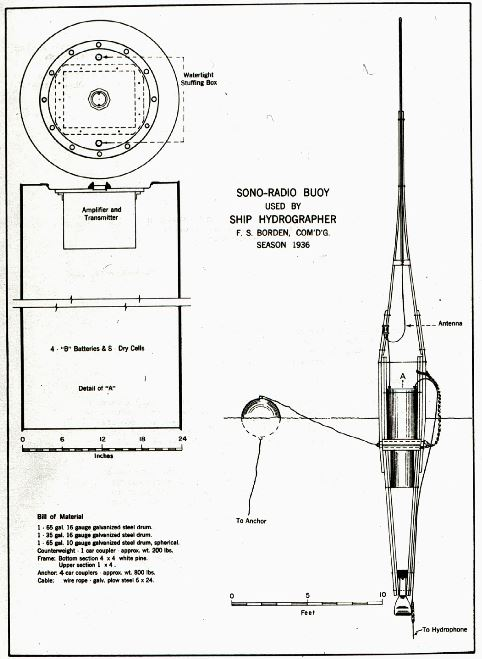
A 1936 USC&GS illustration of a radio-sonobuoy

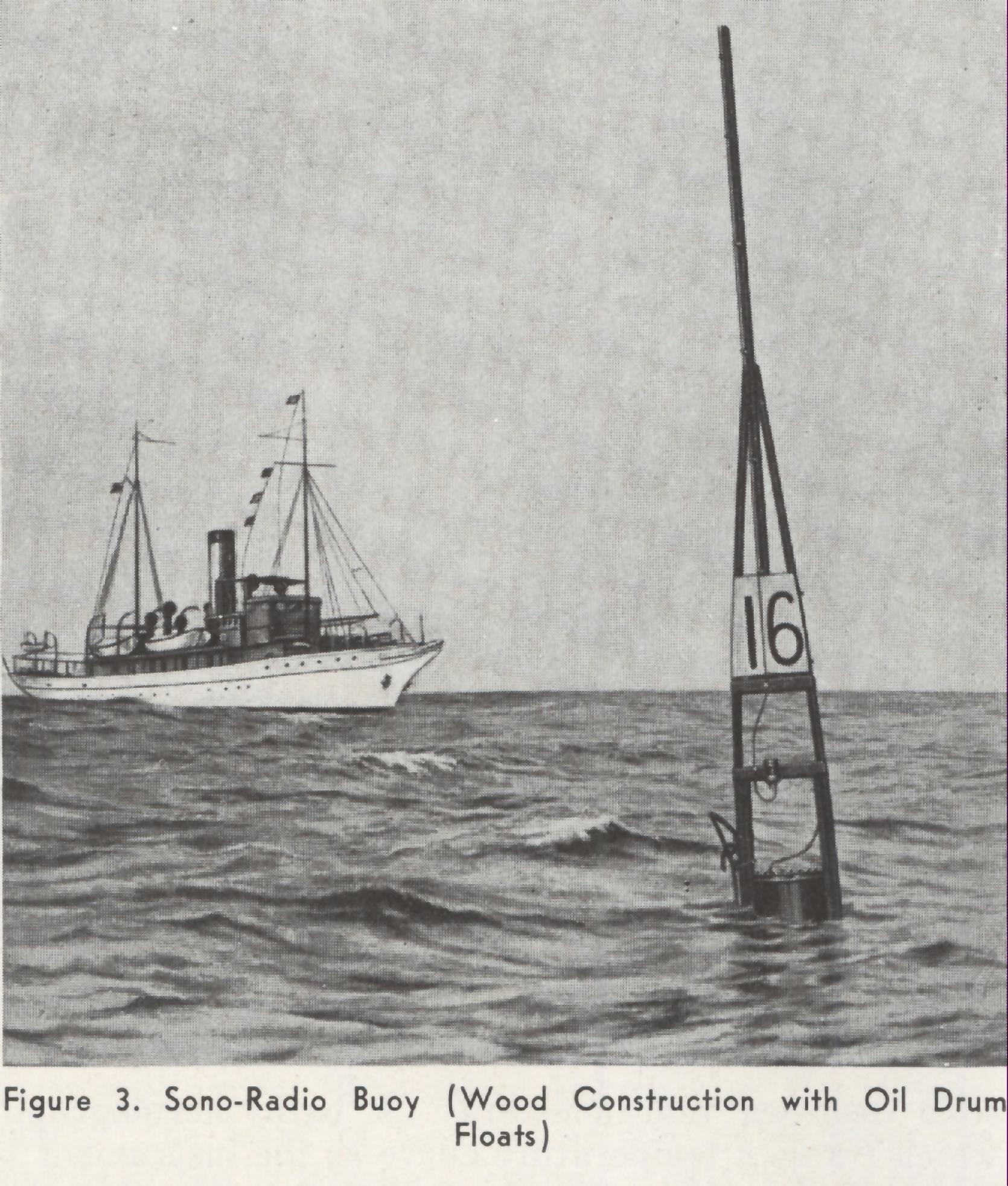
Undated USC&GS illustration of a radio-sonobuoy in use

RAR had limitations and drawbacks. Local peculiarities in the propagation of acoustic waves in the water column could degrade its accuracy, there were problems with maintaining hydrophone stations, and handling explosive charges posed a considerable danger to personnel and ships. On one occasion a USC&GS Corps ensign on board the survey ship USC&GS Hydrographer inserted a RAR bomb in the mouth of a shark and released the shark, only to watch in horror as it swam back to the ship and exploded next to Hydrographer′s hull; the explosion rocked the ship. Aboard Guide in 1927, tragedy almost struck when a petty officer handling a bomb lit its fuse and then fell when the ship lurched; he dropped the bomb, which rolled into a gutter. The petty officer fell again before finally reaching the bomb and heaving it overboard just in time; it exploded alongside the ship just as it hit the water. The concussion prompted half the crew to rush up from below decks to find out what had happened.

As late as 1942, RAR remained important enough to the USC&GS for it to devote just over 100 pages of its Hydrographic Manual to it. However, World War II, which by then had been raging for three years, gave impetus to the rapid development of purely radio-based navigation systems to assist bombers in finding their targets in darkness and bad weather. Such systems were easier to maintain than hydrophone stations and did not require the handling of explosives and, as the new systems matured, the USC&GS began to apply them to maritime navigation. RAR appears not to have been used after 1944, and by 1946, USC&GS ships had switched over to the new SHORAN electronic navigation technology to fix their positions.

== Legacy ==
The first non-visual method of precise navigation in human history, and the first that could be used at any time of day or night and in any weather conditions, RAR was a major step forward in the development of modern navigation systems. Nicholas Heck revolutionized oceanic surveying through the use of radio electronic ranging to establish ship locations, one of his major contributions to oceanography. His work related to the technique also helped to develop underwater sound velocity tables allowing the establishment of "true depths" of up to five miles (8.0 km) using echo sounding.

RAR was an early step along the path to modern electronic navigation systems, oceanographic telemetering systems, and the development of marine seismic surveying. The technique also laid the groundwork for the development of sonars capable of looking ahead of and to the sides of vessels.

The USC&GS' radio-sonobuoys, developed to support RAR, were the ancestors of the sonobuoys used by ships and aircraft in anti-submarine warfare and underwater acoustic research today.

== See also ==
- Acoustic mirror
- Underwater acoustic communication
- Underwater acoustic positioning system
- Underwater locator beacon
