= Hydrographic survey =

Science of measurement and description of features which affect maritime activities

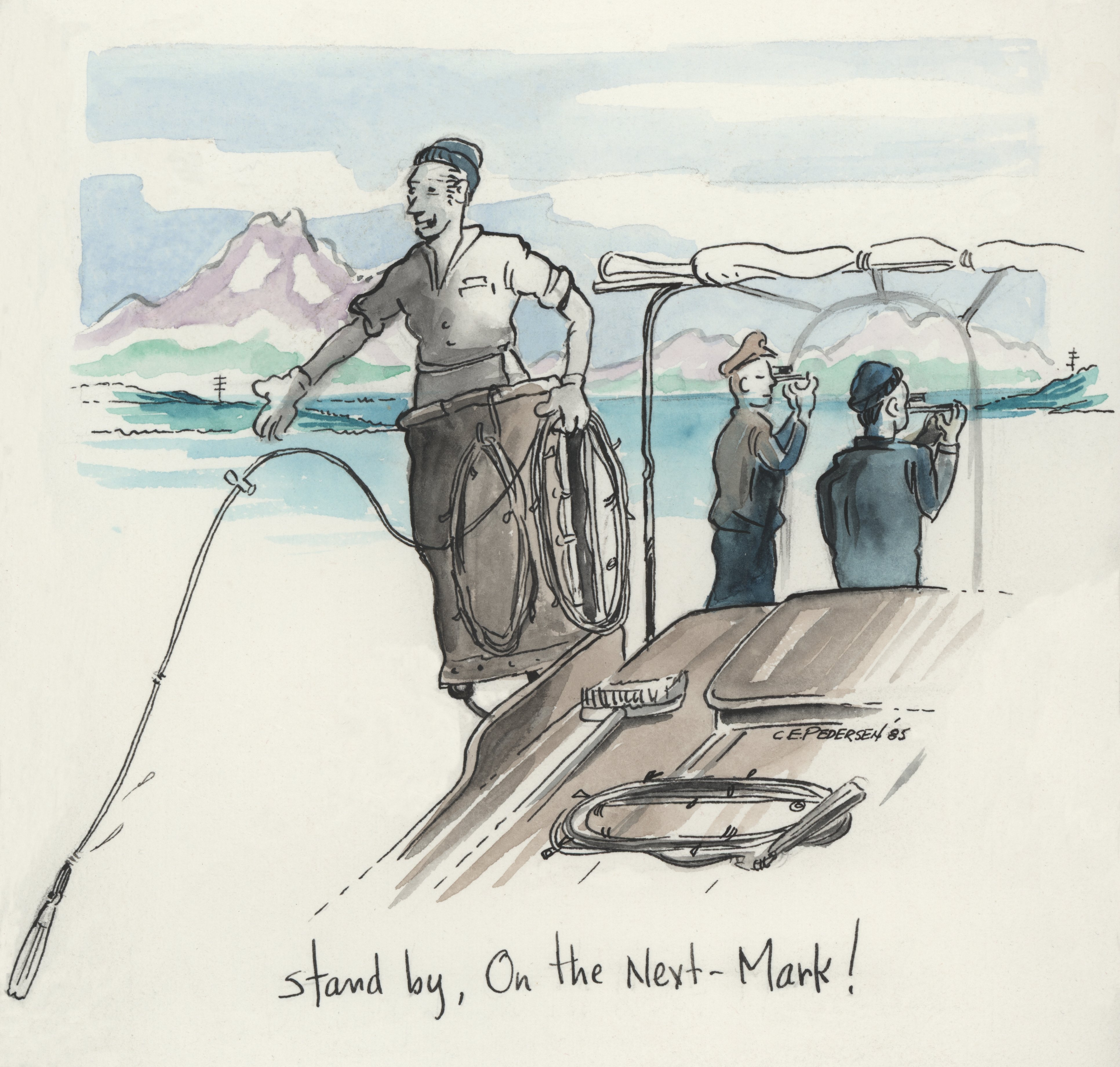
A nostalgic 1985 sketch of hydrographic surveying in Alaska.

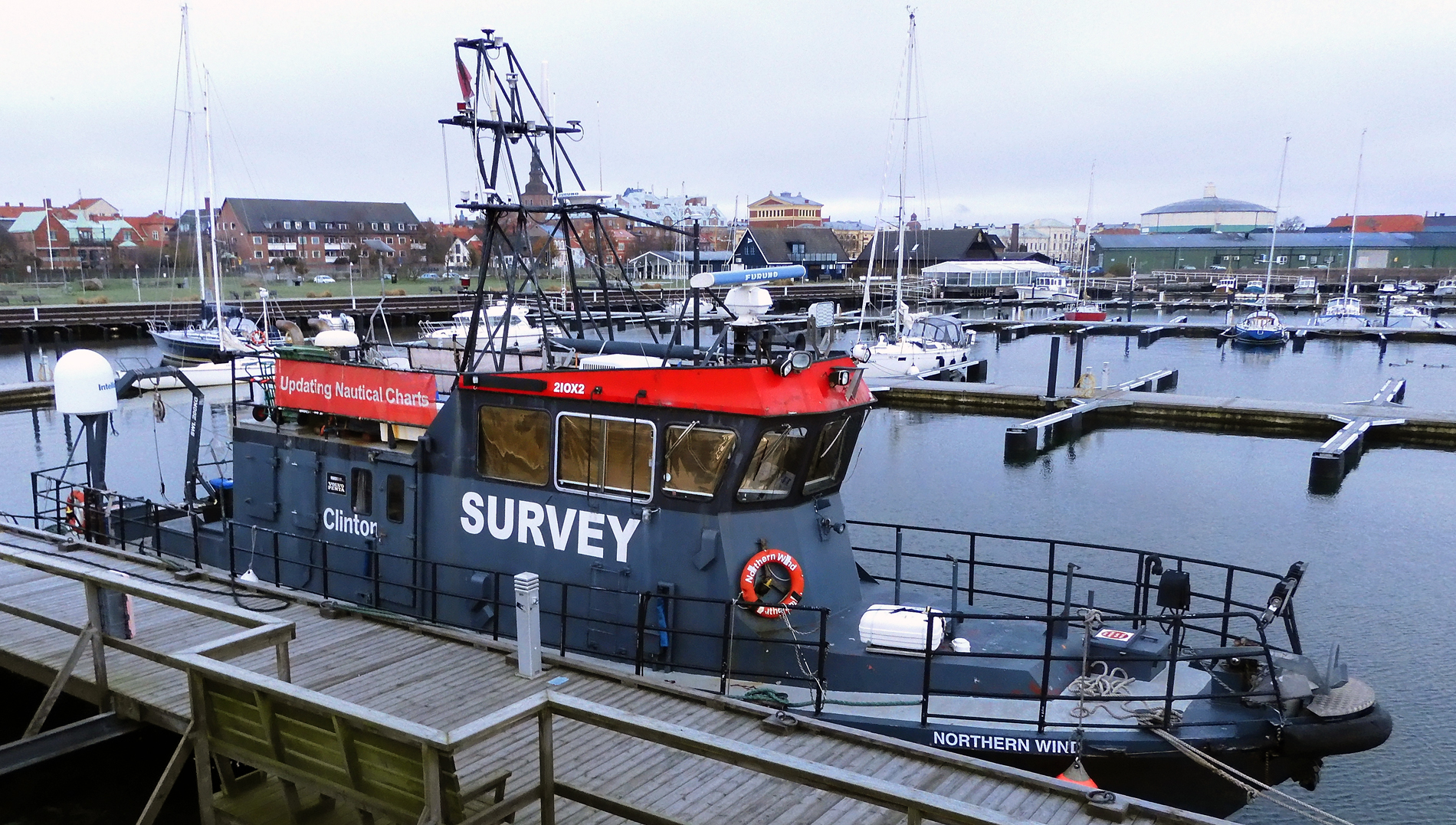
A ship for updating nautical charts.

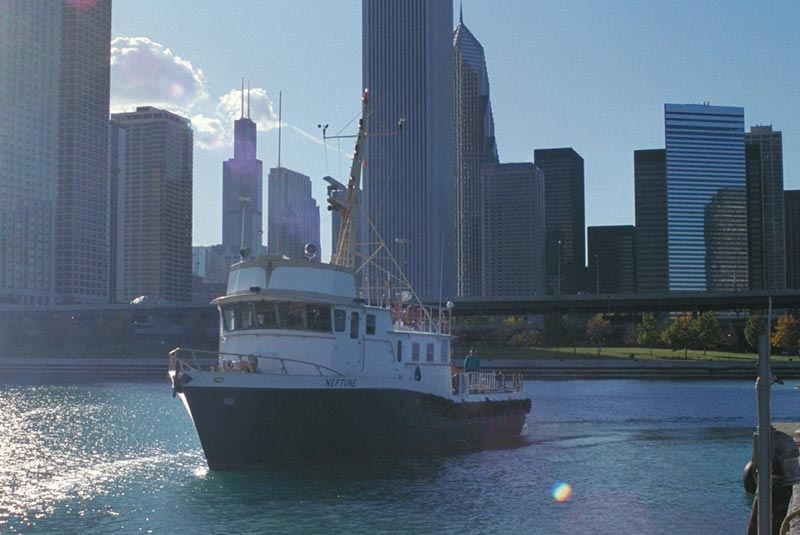
Neptune, a privately owned survey ship based in Chicago, Illinois.

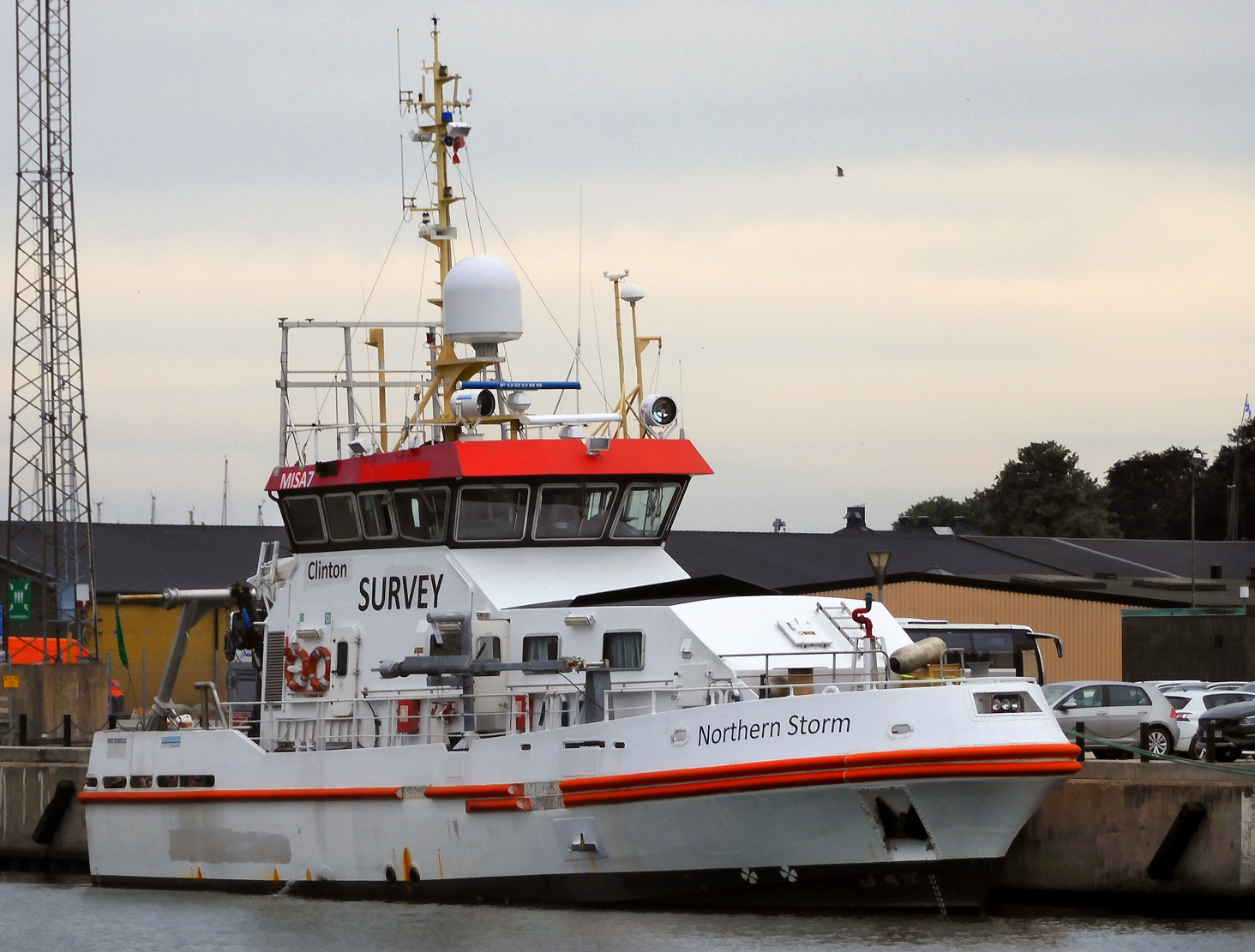
Clintons Northern Storm in the harbour of Ystad 7 July 2021.

Hydrographic survey is the science of measurement and description of features which affect maritime navigation, marine construction, dredging, offshore wind farms, offshore oil exploration and drilling and related activities. Surveys may also be conducted to determine the route of subsea cables such as telecommunications cables, cables associated with wind farms, and HVDC power cables. Strong emphasis is placed on soundings, shorelines, tides, currents, seabed and submerged obstructions that relate to the previously mentioned activities. The term hydrography is used synonymously to describe maritime cartography, which in the final stages of the hydrographic process uses the raw data collected through hydrographic survey into information usable by the end user.

Hydrography is collected under rules which vary depending on the acceptance authority. Traditionally conducted by ships with a sounding line or echo sounding, surveys are increasingly conducted with the aid of aircraft and sophisticated electronic sensor systems in shallow waters.

Offshore survey is a specific discipline of hydrographic survey primarily concerned with the description of the condition of the seabed and the condition of the subsea oilfield infrastructure that interacts with it.

== Organizations ==
=== National and international offices ===
Hydrographic offices evolved from naval heritage and are usually found within national naval structures, for example Spain's Instituto Hidrográfico de la Marina. Coordination of those organizations and product standardization is voluntarily joined with the goal of improving hydrography and safe navigation is conducted by the International Hydrographic Organization (IHO). The IHO publishes Standards and Specifications followed by its Member States as well as Memoranda of Understanding and Co-operative Agreements with hydrographic survey interests.

The product of such hydrography is most often seen on nautical charts published by the national agencies and required by the International Maritime Organization (IMO), the Safety of Life at Sea (SOLAS) and national regulations to be carried on vessels for safety purposes. Increasingly those charts are provided and used in electronic form unders IHO standards.

=== Non-national agencies ===
Governmental entities below the national level conduct or contract for hydrographic surveys for waters within their jurisdictions with both internal and contract assets. Such surveys commonly are conducted by national organizations or under their supervision or the standards they have approved, particularly when the use is for the purposes of chart making and distribution or the dredging of state-controlled waters.

In the United States, there is coordination with the National Hydrography Dataset in survey collection and publication. State environmental organizations publish hydrographic data relating to their mission.

=== Private organizations ===
Commercial entities also conduct large-scale hydrographic and geophysical surveying, particularly in the dredging, marine construction, oil exploration, and drilling industries. Industrial entities installing submarine communications cables or power require detailed surveys of cable routes prior to installation and increasingly use acoustic imagery equipment previously found only in military applications when conducting their surveys. Specialized companies exist that have both the equipment and expertise to contract with both commercial and governmental entities to perform such surveys .

Companies, universities, and investment groups will often fund hydrographic surveys of public waterways prior to developing areas adjacent those waterways. Survey firms are also contracted to survey in support of design and engineering firms that are under contract for large public projects. Private surveys are also conducted before dredging operations and after these operations are completed. Companies with large private slips, docks, or other waterfront installations have their facilities and the open water near their facilities surveyed regularly, as do islands in areas subject to variable erosion such as in the Maldives.

== Methods ==
=== Lead lines and sounding poles ===
The history of hydrographic surveying dates almost as far back as that of sailing. For many centuries, a hydrographic survey required the use of lead lines – ropes or lines with depth markings attached to lead weights to make one end sink to the bottom when lowered over the side of a ship or boat – and sounding poles, which were poles with depth markings which could be thrust over the side until they touched bottom. In either case, the depths measured had to be read manually and recorded, as did the position of each measurement with regard to mapped reference points as determined by three-point sextant fixes. The process was labor-intensive and time-consuming and, although each individual depth measurement could be accurate, even a thorough survey as a practical matter could include only a limited number of sounding measurements relative to the area being surveyed, inevitably leaving gaps in coverage between soundings.

=== Wire-drag surveying ===
In 1904, wire-drag surveys were introduced into hydrography, and the United States Coast and Geodetic Survey′s Nicholas H. Heck played a prominent role in developing and perfecting the technique between 1906 and 1916. In the wire-drag method, a wire attached to two ships or boats and set at a certain depth by a system of weights and buoys was dragged between two points. If the wire encountered an obstruction, it would become taut and form a "V" shape. The location of the "V" revealed the position of submerged rocks, wrecks, and other obstructions, while the depth at which the wire was set showed the depth at which the obstruction was encountered. This method revolutionized hydrographic surveying, as it allowed a quicker, less laborious, and far more complete survey of an area than did the use of lead lines and sounding poles. From a navigational safety point of view, a wire-drag survey would not miss a hazard to navigation that projected above the drag wire depth.

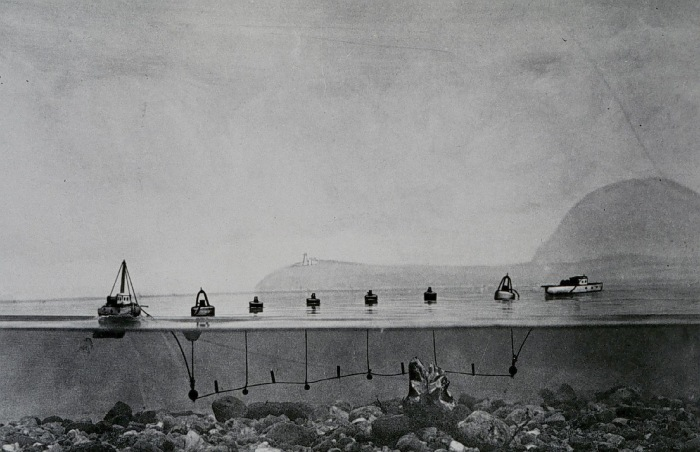
Wire-drag hydrographic survey operations (diagram),
U.S. Coast and Geodetic Survey, ca. 1920.

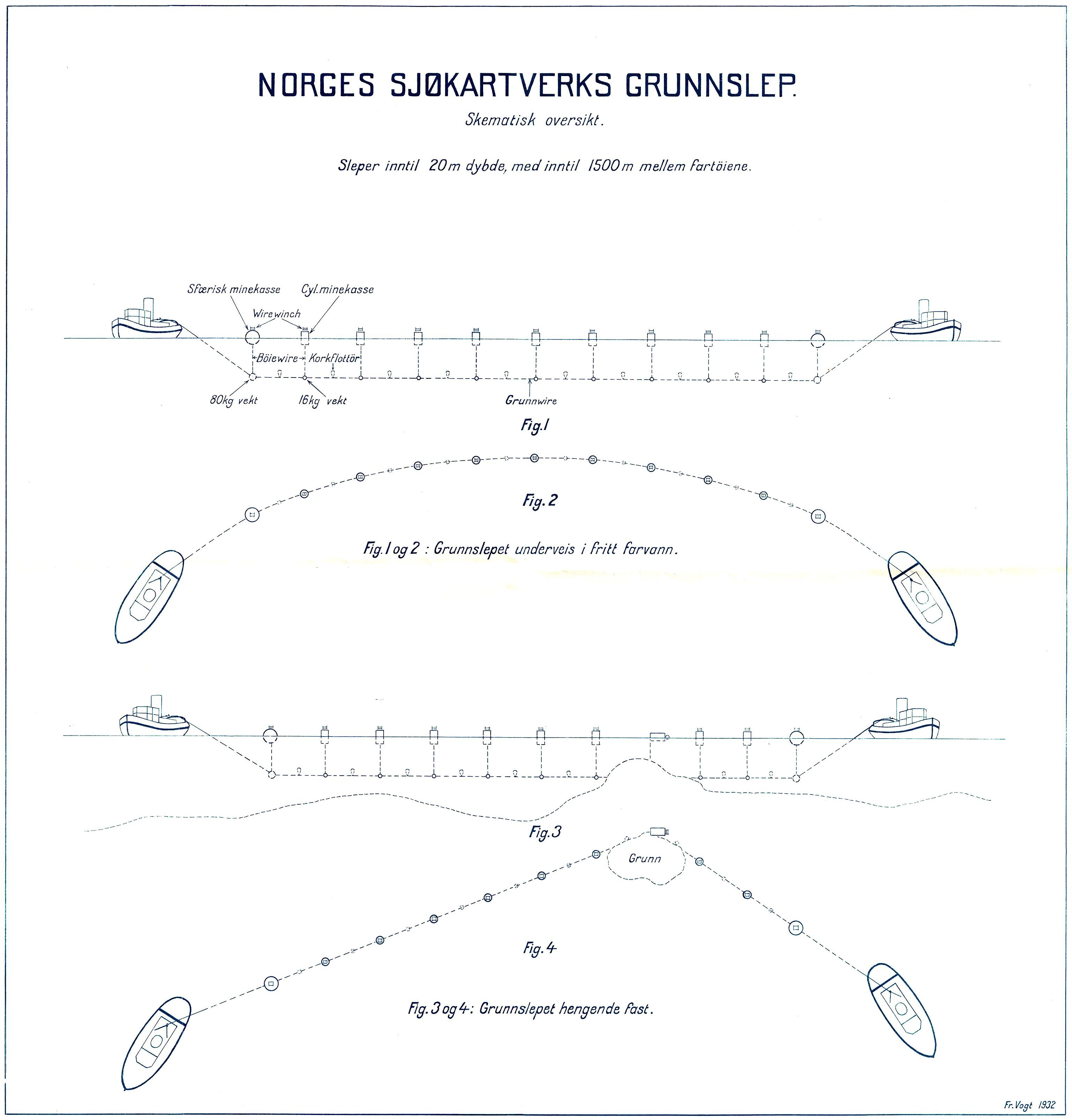
Principle of sea surveying with two boats,
Norwegian Sea Survey, 1932.

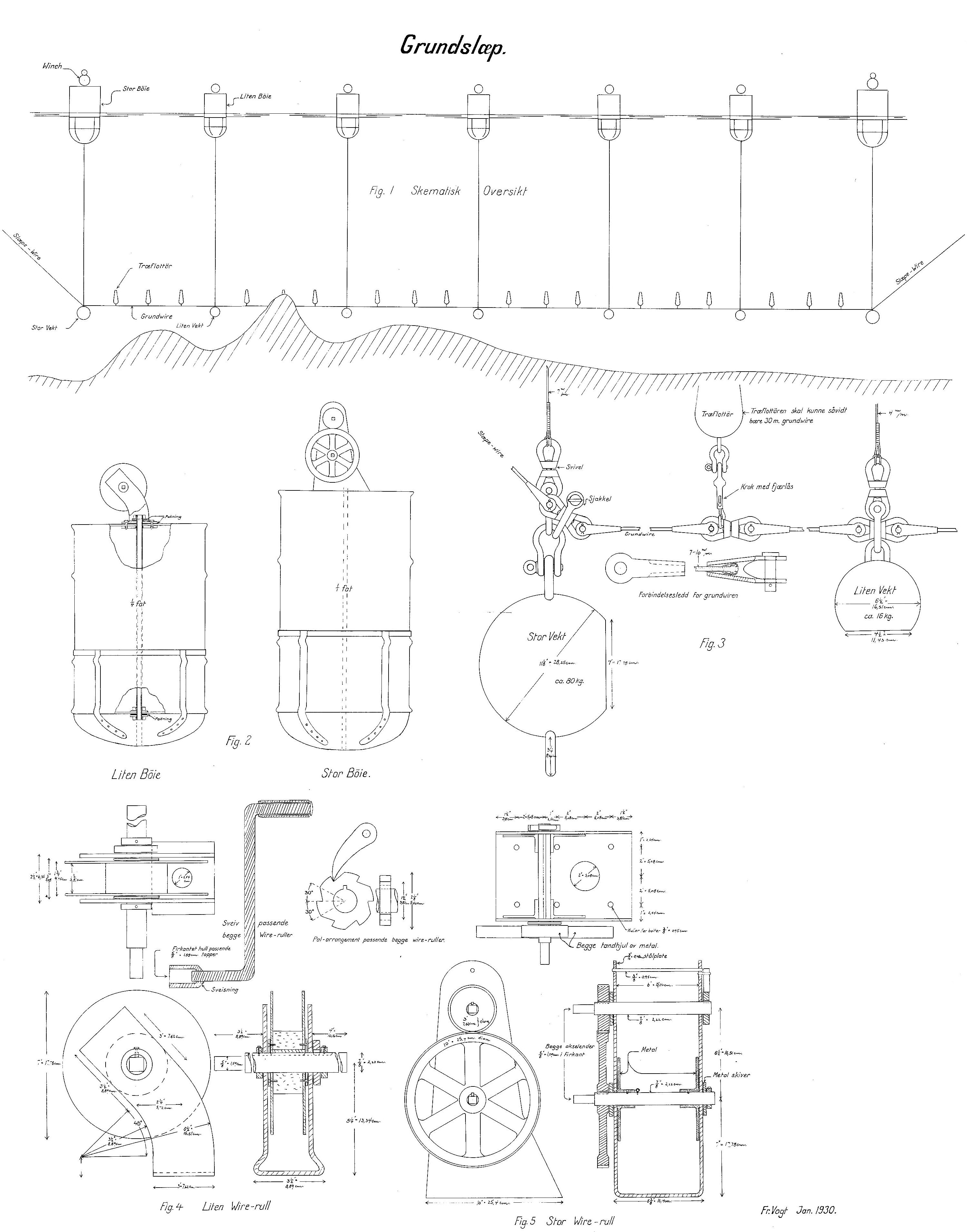
Technical details of tools used,
Norwegian Sea Survey, 1930.

Prior to the advent of sidescan sonar, wire-drag surveying was the only method for searching large areas for obstructions and lost vessels and aircraft. Between 1906 and 1916, Heck expanded the capability of wire-drag systems from a relatively limited area to sweeps covering channels 2 to 3 nautical miles (3.7 to 5.6 km; 2.3 to 3.5 mi) in width. The wire-drag technique was a major contribution to hydrographic surveying during much of the rest of the 20th century. So valuable was wire-drag surveying in the United States that for decades the U.S. Coast and Geodetic Survey, and later the National Oceanic and Atmospheric Administration, fielded a pair of sister ships of identical design specifically to work together on such surveys. USC&GS Marindin and USC&GS Ogden conducted wire-drag surveys together from 1919 to 1942, USC&GS Hilgard (ASV 82) and USC&GS Wainwright (ASV 83) took over from 1942 to 1967, and USC&GS Rude (ASV 90) (later NOAAS Rude (S 590)) and USC&GS Heck (ASV 91) (later NOAAS Heck (S 591)) worked together on wire-drag operations from 1967.

The rise of new electronic technologies – sidescan sonar and multibeam swath systems – in the 1950s, 1960s and 1970s eventually made the wire-drag system obsolete. Sidescan sonar could create images of underwater obstructions with the same fidelity as aerial photography, while multibeam systems could generate depth data for 100 percent of the bottom in a surveyed area. These technologies allowed a single vessel to do what wire-drag surveying required two vessels to do, and wire-drag surveys finally came to an end in the early 1990s. Vessels were freed from working together on wire-drag surveys, and in the U.S. National Oceanic and Atmospheric Administration (NOAA), for example, Rude and Heck operated independently in their later years.

=== Single-beam echosounders ===
Single-beam echosounders and fathometers began to enter service in the 1930s which used sonar to measure the depth beneath a vessel. This greatly increased the speed of acquiring sounding data over that possible with lead lines and sounding poles by allowing information on depths beneath a vessel to be gathered in a series of lines spaced at a specified distance. However, it shared the weakness of earlier methods by lacking depth information for areas in between the strips of sea bottom the vessel sounded.

=== Multibeam Echosounders ===
A multibeam echosounder (MBES) is a type of sonar that is used to map the seabed. It emits acoustic waves in a fan shape beneath its transceiver. The time it takes for the sound waves to reflect off the seabed and return to the receiver is used to calculate the water depth. Unlike other sonars and echo sounders, MBES uses beamforming to extract directional information from the returning soundwaves, producing a swath of depth soundings from a single ping.

Explicit inclusion of phraseology like: "For all MBES surveys for LINZ, high resolution, geo-referenced backscatter intensity is to be logged and rendered as a survey deliverable." in a set of contract survey requirements, is a clear indication that the wider hydrographic community is embracing the benefits that can be accrued by employing MBES technology and, in particular, are accepting as a fact that a MBES which provides acoustic backscatter data is a valuable tool of the trade.

The introduction of multispectral multibeam echosounders continues the trajectory of technological innovations providing the hydrographic surveying community with better tools for more rapidly acquiring better data for multiple uses. A multispectral multibeam echosounder is the culmination of many progressive advances in hydrography from the early days of acoustic soundings when the primary concern about the strength of returning echoes from the bottom was whether, or not, they would be sufficiently large to be noted (detected). The operating frequencies of the early acoustic sounders were primarily based on the ability of magneostrictive and piezoelectric materials whose physical dimensions could be modified by means of electrical current or voltage. Eventually it became apparent, that while the operating frequency of the early single vertical beam acoustic sounders had little, or no, bearing on the measured depths when the bottom was hard (composed primarily of sand, pebbles, cobbles, boulders, or rock), there was a noticeable frequency dependency of the measured depths when the bottom was soft (composed primarily of silt, mud or flocculent suspensions). It was observed that higher frequency single vertical beam echosounders could provide detectable echo amplitudes from high porosity sediments, even if those sediments appeared to be acoustically transparent at lower frequencies.

In the late 1960s, single-beam hydrographic surveys were conducted using widely spaced track lines and the shallow (peak) soundings in the bottom data were retained in preference to deeper soundings in the sounding record. During that same time period, early side scan sonar was introduced into the operational practices of shallow water hydrographic surveying. The frequencies of the early side scan sonars were a matter of engineering design expediency and the most important aspect of the side scanning echoes was not the value of their amplitudes, but rather that the amplitudes were spatially variable. In fact, important information was deduced about the shape of the bottom and manmade items on the bottom, based on the regions where there were absences of detectable echo amplitudes (shadows) In 1979, in hopes of a technological solution to the problems of surveying in "floating mud", the Director of the National Ocean Survey (NOS) established a NOS study team to conduct investigations to determine the functional specifications for a replacement shallow water depth sounder. The outcome of the study was a class of vertical-beam depth sounders, which is still widely used. It simultaneously pinged at two acoustic frequencies, separated by more than 2 octaves, making depth and echo-amplitude measurements that were concurrent, both spatially and temporally, albeit at a single vertical grazing angle.

The first MBES generation was dedicated to mapping the seafloor in deep water. Those pioneering MBES made little, or no, explicit use of the amplitudes, as their objective was to obtain accurate measurements of the bathymetry (representing both the peaks and deeps). Furthermore, their technical characteristics did not make it easy to observe spatial variations in the echo amplitudes. Subsequent to the early MBES bathymetric surveys and at the time when single frequency side scan sonar had begun to produce high quality images of the seabed that were capable of providing a degree of discrimination between different types of sediments, the potential of the echo amplitudes from a MBES was recognized.

With Marty Klein's introduction of dual frequency (nominally 100 kHz and 500 kHz) side scan sonar, it was apparent that spatially and temporally coincident backscatter from any given seabed at those two widely separated acoustic frequencies, would likely provide two separate and unique images of that seascape. Admittedly, the along-track insonification and receiving beam patterns were different, and due to the absence of bathymetric data, the precise backscatter grazing angles were unknown. However, the overlapping sets of side scanning across-track grazing angles at the two frequencies were always the same.

Following the grounding of the Queen Elizabeth 2 off Cape Cod, Massachusetts, in 1992, the emphasis for shallow water surveying migrated toward full bottom coverage surveys by employing MBES with increasing operating frequencies to further improve the spatial resolution of the soundings. Given that side scan sonar, with its across-track fan-shaped swath of insonification, had successfully exploited the cross-track variation in echo amplitudes, to achieve high quality images of the seabed, it seemed a natural progression that the fan-shaped across-track pattern of insonification associated with the new monotone higher frequency shallow water MBES, might also be exploited for seabed imagery. Images acquired under the initial attempts at MBES bottom imaging were less than stellar, but fortunately improvements were forthcoming.

Side scan sonar parses the continual echo returns from a receive beam that is perfectly aligned with the insonification beam using time-after-transmit, a technique that is independent of water depth and the cross-track beam opening angle of the sonar receive transducer. The initial attempt at multibeam imagery employed multiple receive beams, which only partially overlapped the MBES fan-shaped insonification beam, to segment the continual echo returns into intervals that were dependent on water depth and receiver cross-track beam opening angle. Consequently, the segmented intervals were non-uniform in both their length of time and time-after-transmit. The backscatter from each ping in each of the beam-parsed segments was reduced to a single value and assigned to the same geographical coordinates as those assigned to that beam's measured sounding. In subsequent modifications to MBES bottom imaging, the echo sequence in each of the beam-parsed intervals was designated as a snippet. On each ping, each snippet from each beam was additionally parsed according to time-after-transmit. Each of the echo amplitude measurements made within a snippet from a particular beam was assigned a geographical position based on linear interpolation between positions assigned to the soundings measured, on that ping, in the two adjacent cross-track beams. The snippet modification to MBES imagery significantly improved the quality of the imagery by increasing the number of echo amplitude measurements available to be rendered as a pixel in the image and also by having a more uniform spatial distribution of the pixels in the image which represented an actual measured echo amplitude.

The introduction of multispectral multibeam echosounders continued the progressive advances in hydrography. In particular, multispectral multibeam echosounders not only provide "multiple look" depth measurements of a seabed, they also provide multispectral backscatter data that are spatially and temporally coincident with those depth measurements. A multispectral multibeam echosounder directly computes a position of origin for each of the backscatter amplitudes in the output data set. Those positions are based on the backscatter measurements themselves and not by interpolation from some other derived data set. Consequently, multispectral multibeam imagery is more acute compared to previous multibeam imagery. The inherent precision of the bathymetric data from a multispectral multibeam echosounder is also a benefit to those users that may be attempting to employ the acoustic backscatter angular response function to discriminate between different sediment types. Multispectral multibeam echosounders reinforces the fact that spatially and temporally coincident backscatter, from any given seabed, at widely separated acoustic frequencies provides separate and unique images of the seascape.

=== Crowdsourcing ===
Crowdsourcing also is entering hydrographic surveying, with projects such as OpenSeaMap, TeamSurv and ARGUS. Here, volunteer vessels record position, depth, and time data using their standard navigation instruments, and then the data is post-processed to account for speed of sound, tidal, and other corrections. With this approach there is no need for a specific survey vessel, or for professionally qualified surveyors to be on board, as the expertise is in the data processing that occurs once the data is uploaded to the server after the voyage. Apart from obvious cost savings, this also gives a continuous survey of an area, but the drawbacks are time in recruiting observers and getting a high enough density and quality of data. Although sometimes accurate to 0.1 – 0.2m, this approach cannot substitute for a rigorous systematic survey, where this is required. Nevertheless, the results are often adequate for many requirements where high resolution, high accuracy surveys are not required, are unaffordable or simply have not been done yet.

==== General Bathymetric Chart of the Oceans ====
The General Bathymetric Chart of the Oceans (GEBCO) is a publicly available bathymetric chart of the world's oceans. The project was conceived with the aim of preparing a global series of charts showing the general shape of the seafloor. Over the years it has become a reference map of the bathymetry of the world's oceans for scientists and others.

== Modern integrated hydrographic surveying ==
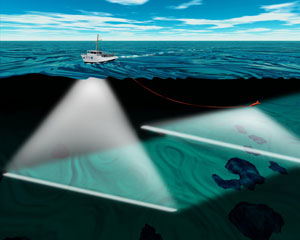
Graphic depicting NOAA hydrographic survey ship conducting multibeam and side scan sonar operations

In suitable shallow-water areas lidar (light detection and ranging) may be used. Equipment can be installed on inflatable craft, such as Zodiacs, small craft, autonomous underwater vehicles (AUVs), unmanned underwater vehicles (UUVs), Remote Operated Vehicles (ROV) or large ships, and can include sidescan, single-beam and multibeam equipment. At one time different data collection methods and standards were used in collecting hydrographic data for maritime safety and for scientific or engineering bathymetric charts, but increasingly, with the aid of improved collection techniques and computer processing, the data is collected under one standard and extracted for specific use.

After data is collected, it has to undergo post-processing. A massive amount of data is collected during the typical hydrographic survey, often several soundings per square foot. Depending on the final use intended for the data (for example, navigation charts, Digital Terrain Model, volume calculation for dredging, topography, or bathymetry) this data must be thinned out. It must also be corrected for errors (i.e., bad soundings,) and for the effects of tides, heave, water level salinity and thermoclines (water temperature differences) as the velocity of sound varies with temperature and salinity and affects accuracy. Usually the surveyor has additional data collection equipment on site to measure and record the data required for correcting the soundings. The final output of charts can be created with a combination of specialty charting software or a computer-aided design (CAD) package, usually Autocad.

Although the accuracy of crowd-sourced surveying can rarely reach the standards of traditional methods, the algorithms used rely on a high data density to produce final results that are more accurate than single measurements. A comparison of crowd-sourced surveys with multibeam surveys indicates an accuracy of crowd-sourced surveys of around plus or minus 0.1 to 0.2 meter (about 4 to 8 inches).

== See also ==
- Bathymetry – Study of underwater depth of lake or ocean floors
  - Bathymetric chart – Map depicting the submerged terrain of bodies of water
- Echo sounding – Method of measuring the depth of water
- Hydrography – Measurement of bodies of water
- National Irrigation Congress – Agricultural pressure group
- National Ocean Service – U.S. government agency
- Office of Coast Survey – Chartmaker of the United States of America
- Offshore survey – Discipline of hydrographic survey largely concerned with the oil industry
- Radio acoustic ranging – Method of accurately determining a ship's position
- Survey vessel – Type of research vessel
- U.S. National Geodetic Survey – U.S. federal surveying and mapping agency
- United States Coast and Geodetic Survey – Former U.S. government scientific agency
