= USS Viking (ARS-1) =

Minesweeper of the United States Navy

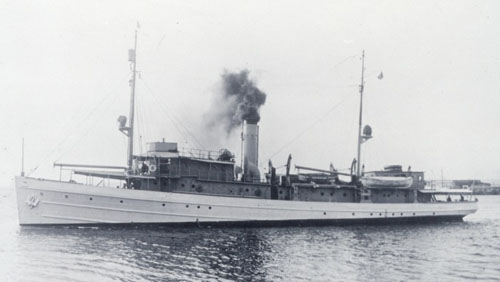
- USC&GS Guide

History

United States
- Name: USS Flamingo (AM-32)
- Namesake: Flamingo
- Owner: United States Navy
- Builder: New Jersey Drydock and Transportation Company, Elizabethport, New Jersey
- Laid down: 18 October 1917
- Commissioned: 12 February 1919
- Decommissioned: 5 May 1922
- Fate: Transferred to U.S. Coast and Geodetic Survey 23 January 1923

United States
- Name: USC&GS Guide
- Namesake: Guide, a person who leads anyone through unknown or unmapped country
- Owner: U.S. Coast and Geodetic Survey
- Acquired: 23 January 1923 by U.S. Department of Commerce via transfer from U.S. Navy
- Home port: New London, Connecticut, 1923; San Diego, California, 1923–1941
- Nickname(s): Guide and survey ships USC&GS Discoverer and USC&GS Pioneer collectively were known as the "Bird Boats"
- Fate: Transferred to U.S. Navy 27 June 1941

United States
- Name: USS Viking (ARS-1)
- Owner: United States Navy
- Acquired: 27 June 1941
- Commissioned: 3 January 1942
- Stricken: 19 April 1953
- Fate: Sold for scrapping, 22 July 1953

General characteristics as minesweeper
- Class & type: Lapwing-class minesweeper
- Displacement: 850 tons
- Length: 180 ft (55 m)
- Beam: 35 ft 6 in (10.82 m)
- Draft: 9 ft (2.7 m)9½"
- Installed power: two Babcock & Wilcox boilers
- Propulsion: Triple expansion reciprocating steam engine, one shaft.
- Speed: 14 knots (26 km/h; 16 mph)
- Complement: 78
- Armament: 2 × 3"/50 caliber gun mounts

General characteristics as survey ship
- Type: Survey ship
- Displacement: 850 to 950 tons
- Length: 187.8 ft (57.2 m)
- Beam: 35.5 ft (10.8 m)
- Draft: 9.8 ft (3.0 m)
- Installed power: Two 200-psi Babcock & Wilcox boilers; 1,200 shaft horsepower (1.6 megawatts)
- Propulsion: Harlan and Hollingsworth vertical triple expansion engine; one shaft
- Speed: 14 knots

USS Flamingo (AM-32) was a Lapwing-class minesweeper built for the United States Navy near the end of World War I. After service overseas clearing mines after the Armistice, the ship was laid up until 1922 when she was transferred to the United States Department of Commerce for use by the United States Coast and Geodetic Survey. Renamed USC&GS Guide, the ship operated as a survey vessel along the West Coast of the United States for 17 years, making significant contributions to navigation, hydrographic surveying, and oceanography. In June 1941, Guide was transferred back to the Navy, converted into a salvage ship, and renamed USS Viking (ARS-1). As Viking, she worked primarily from bases in California until 1953, when she was sold for scrapping.

== USS Flamingo ==
The first USS Flamingo (AM-32), a Lapwing-class minesweeper, was laid down on 18 October 1917 by the New Jersey Drydock and Transportation Company at Elizabethport, New Jersey. She was launched on 24 August 1918 and commissioned as USS Flamingo, Minesweeper No. 32, on 12 February 1919. Flamingo fitted out at the New York Navy Yard in Brooklyn, New York, and later shifted to Tompkinsville, Staten Island, New York, on 29 March 1919. The minesweeper performed various towing jobs and carried stores locally in the 3rd Naval District into the spring of 1919. On 10 April 1919, she suffered damage in a collision with an unnamed Panama Railroad Company tug, and she underwent repairs at Port Richmond, Staten Island. Shifting to the New York Navy Yard soon thereafter, Flamingo began fitting out for "distant service."

Flamingo departed Tompkinsville on 18 May 1919 bound for the Orkney Islands. Proceeding via Boston, Massachusetts, she arrived at Kirkwall, Scotland, on 5 June 1919 to begin her tour of duty with the United States Minesweeping Detachment, North Sea. Along with U.S. Navy submarine chasers, chartered British naval trawlers, and fellow Lapwing-class minesweepers, Flamingo participated in the clearing of the North Sea Mine Barrage. Laid by the U.S. Navy after the United States entered World War I, the barrier had served as a formidable obstacle for German submarines based at North Sea ports. By 1919, however, the barrage merely hampered the resumption of peaceful commerce.

On 23 June 1919, Flamingo transported officers and men from Kirkwall to Inverness, Scotland, and returned to her base in the evening carrying supplies for the detachment flagship, USS Black Hawk (Destroyer Tender No. 9).Flamingo then performed tug duty at Kirkwallcbetween 25 June and 7 July 1919. On 11 July 1919, she departed to assist in clearing Group 11 of the mine barrage in the second phase of the fourth clearance operation conducted by the Minesweeping Detachment.

The first days were uneventful. On 15 July, Flamingo anchored for the night, as was usual practice, to the north of the minefield. During the ensuing evening hours, strong winds and currents caused herto drag her anchor. She slowly worked southward from her original position. The next morning, when Flamingo weighed anchor to get underway, she discovered that she had drifted into the minefield and had fouled one of the mines in her anchor cable. The mine was trailing just beneath the fantail of the ship and exploded beneath Flamingo′s stern. The underwater blast badly damaged the rudder, disabled the capstan and generator, and dished in the ship's stern plating in several places. USS Eider (Minesweeper No. 17) lent assistance and towed Flamingo to Invergordon, Scotland, for drydocking and repairs on 17 July 1919.

Flamingo was ready to return to the base at Kirkwall by early August 1919. She transported a cargo of steel and lumber to Black Hawk on her return voyage, arriving at Kirkwall on 13 August 1919. Two days later, the minesweeper towed her crippled sister ship USS Pelican (Minesweeper No. 27) to South Shields, England, for drydocking and repairs in the wake of Pelican′s mining in July.

Later in August, Flamingo resumed her minesweeper duties with the detachment, working out of the Norwegian ports of Lervic, Stavanger, and Haugesund before returning to Kirkwall via Otters Wick, Orkney, on 7 September 1919. She subsequently participated in the final sweep of the mine barrage – the climactic sweep which detonated five mines, cut loose 47, and destroyed 50 – into late September 1919. Once the arduous and dangerous job was complete, Flamingo departed Kirkwall on 1 October 1919 and, after a voyage which took her via Plymouth and Devonport, England; Brest, France; Lisbon, Portugal; the Azores; and Bermuda, eventually arrived at Tompkinsville on 20 November 1919.

The pause at Tompkinsville was a brief one, however, for Flamingo was underway five days later, on 25 November 1919, bound for the Portsmouth Navy Yard in Kittery, Maine. She arrived on 28 November 1919 and soon commenced an overhaul. Assigned to the 1st Division, 2nd Mine Squadron, United States Atlantic Fleet, on 1 July 1920, Flamingo received the classification AM-32 on 17 July 1920, as the U.S. Navy adopted its modern system of alphanumeric hull numbers on that date. Flamingo operated with the 2nd Mine Squadron into the autumn of 1920, then was placed in reserve at Portsmouth Navy Yard on 18 November 1920.

== USC&GS Guide ==
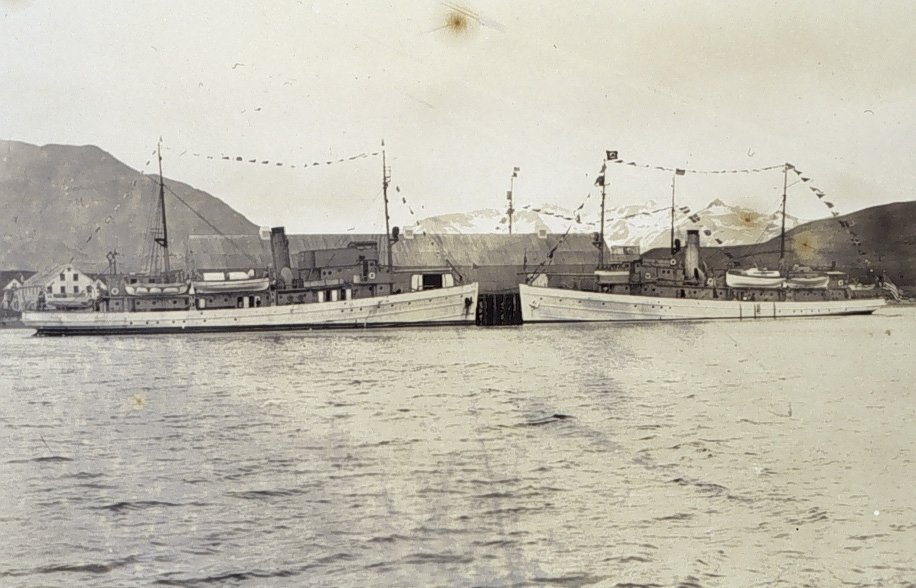
USC&GS Pioneer and USC&GS Guide at Dutch Harbor, Territory of Alaska, in 1940.

Flamingo remained inactive for almost a year a half before an executive order of 25 March 1922 authorized the Navy to transfer the vessel to the United States Department of Commerce for use by the United States Coast and Geodetic Survey, and she accordingly was decommissioned on 5 May 1922. Turned over to the Coast and Geodetic Survey at Portsmouth Navy Yard on 23 January 1923 for use as a survey vessel, the ship was renamed USC&GS Guide, first Coast and Geodetic Survey ship of the name, on 1 March 1923. She and the survey ships USC&GS Discoverer and USC&GS Pioneer, also former Navy minesweepers, were known as the "Bird Boats" in the Coast and Geodetic Survey because all had been named after birds – Guide had been USS Flamingo, Discoverer had been USS Auk (AM-38), and Pioneer had been USS Osprey (AM-29) – while in Navy service.

By January 1923, the Coast and Geodetic Survey had decided to install a Hayes sonic rangefinder – an early echo sounder – aboard Guide, which the Coast and Geodetic Survey planned to commission into its fleet later that year. It also decided to pursue the development of radio acoustic ranging, a new concept involving a method for determining a ship′s precise location at sea by detonating an explosive charge underwater near the ship, detecting the arrival of the underwater sound waves at hydrophones at remote locations, and radioing the time of arrival of the sound waves at the remote stations to the ship, allowing the ship′s crew to use triangulation to determine the ship′s position. Nicholas H. Heck (1882–1953), a United States Coast and Geodetic Survey Corps officer, took charge of that development process. Both echo sounding and radio acoustic ranging required a precise understanding of the speed of sound through water.

Guide′s conversion to and fitting out as a survey ship on the United States East Coast was completed in 1923. After Heck oversaw tests at Coast and Geodetic Survey headquarters in Washington, D.C., that demonstrated that shipboard recording of the time of an explosion could be performed accurately enough for his radio acoustic ranging concept to work, Heck had Guide based at New London, Connecticut. Under his direction, Guide both tested her new echo sounder's ability to make accurate depth soundings and conducted radio acoustic ranging experiments in cooperation with the United States Army Coast Artillery Corps. Despite many difficulties, testing of both echo sounding and radio acoustic ranging wrapped up successfully in November 1923.

In late November 1923, with Heck aboard, Guide departed New London, Connecticut, bound for her new home port, San Diego, California, via Puerto Rico and the Panama Canal, with her route planned to take her over a wide variety of ocean depths so that she could continue to test her echo sounder. Guide made history during the voyage, becoming the first Coast and Geodetic Survey ship to use echo sounding to measure and record the depth of the sea at points along her course; she also measured water temperatures and took water samples so that the Scripps Institution for Biological Research (now the Scripps Institution of Oceanography) at La Jolla, California, could measure salinity levels. She also compared echo sounder soundings with those made by lead lines, discovering that using a single speed of sound through water, as had been the previous practice by those conducting echo sounding experiments, yielded acoustic depth-finding results that did not match the depths found by lead lines. She transited the Panama Canal on 8 December 1923. Before she reached San Diego later in December 1923, she had accumulated much data beneficial to the study of the movement of sound waves through water and measuring their velocity under varying conditions of salinity, density, and temperature, information essential both to depth-finding and radio acoustic ranging.

Upon arriving in California, Heck and Guide personnel in consultation with the Scripps Institution developed formulas that allowed accurate echo sounding of depths in all but the shallowest waters and installed hydrophones at La Jolla and Oceanside, California, to allow experimentation in the Pacific Ocean with radio acoustic ranging. Under Heck's direction, Guide then conducted experiments off the coast of California during the early months of 1924 that demonstrated that accurate echo sounding was possible using the new formulas. Experiments with radio acoustic ranging, despite initial difficulties, demonstrated that the method also was practical, although difficulty with getting some of the explosive charges to detonate hampered some of the experimental program. In April 1924, the Coast and Geodetic Survey concluded that both echo sounding and radio acoustic ranging were fundamentally sound, with no foundational problems left to solve, and that all that remained necessary was continued development and refinement of both techniques during their operational use. Heck turned over continued development of echo sounding and radio acoustic ranging to Guide's commanding officer, Commander Robert Luce, and returned to his duties in Washington, D.C.

Operating off Oregon in 1924, Guide became the first ship to employ radio acoustic ranging operationally. While off Oregon that year, she successfully employed the technique at a distance of 206 nautical miles (382 km) between the ranging explosion and the remote hydrophones detecting its sound and in the process achieved the first observed indication of the ocean sound layer that was later called the sound fixing and ranging (SOFAR) channel or deep sound channel (DSC).

Based at San Diego and conducting hydrographic surveys off the U.S. West Coast, Guide performed Coast and Geodetic Survey duties for over 17 years. In company with Pioneer, she conducted many early bathymetric surveys on the U.S. West Coast. On more than one occasion, Guide assisted mariners in distress. On 3 June 1927, she came to the assistance of the lumber schooner City of Nome, which was on fire at Aberdeen, Washington; Guide stood by City of Nome until 5 June 1927, pumped water into the schooner, and helped retard the fire sufficiently to allow salvage of City of Nome's cargo. On 4 February 1933, she rendered assistance to the fishing boat Giuseppina, which had broken down with engine trouble in Monterey Bay, California.

As tensions mounted in Europe and East Asia in the late 1930s, the U.S. Navy expanded to meet the emergency, especially after World War II began in Europe following the German invasion of Poland on 1 September 1939. The Navy needed auxiliary vessels of various types, and cast a wide net in looking for them. One of the ships identified for transfer to the Navy was Guide, and, on 27 June 1941, she was transferred from the Coast and Geodetic Survey to the Navy.

=== Commemoration ===
An underwater geographic feature of the Pacific Ocean, Guide Seamount off the coast of California, is named for Guide.

== USS Viking ==
On 25 July 1941, work to convert the vessel into a rescue and salvage ship began at the San Diego Marine Construction Company in San Diego. During the reconfiguration, the Navy renamed the ship USS Viking, third U.S. Navy ship of the name, on 5 August 1941 and classified her as ARS-1. While the alterations were still in progress, Imperial Japanese Navy aircraft attacked Pearl Harbor, Hawaii on 7 December 1941, plunging the United States into World War II. Placed in service on 3 January 1942, Viking was pronounced ready for duty on 12 February 1942.

Crewed by civilians and operated from San Diego by the Merritt, Chapman, and Scott salvage firm – a civilian company working under a contract let by the U.S. Navy Bureau of Ships – Viking was assigned to the 11th Naval District.

Between 3 and 6 July 1942, Viking assisted two U.S. Navy local patrol craft, YP-267 and YP-269, which had run aground off San Diego, towing them both back to port for repairs. According to her movement reports, Viking appears to have spent an uneventful autumn and winter at her home port.

Viking shifted to San Francisco, California, briefly in January 1943, en route Guadalupe in Baja California, Mexico, to perform emergency salvage operations under the aegis of the Commander, Western Sea Frontier. Returning to San Diego in February 1943, Viking operated there into 1944.

On 27 October 1944, Viking steamed to San Pedro, California, for a refit. She returned to San Diego later in November 1944. On 31 December 1944, Viking departed San Diego in company with the fleet ocean tug USS Tenino (ATF-115) bound for Clipperton Island. There, the two vessels joined the rescue and salvage ship USS Seize (ARS-26) in unsuccessful attempts to refloat the grounded tank landing ship USS LST-563. During the salvage operation, Viking suffered damage from heavy seas and put into San Diego for repairs soon thereafter.

Viking subsequently operated out of San Diego and San Pedro through the end of World War II in mid-August 1945. She performed tug and tow services for ships ranging in size from destroyers to tank landing ships into the 1950s. In December 1949, she aided the grounded steamer SS Aristocratus off the south point of California′s Santa Rosa Island. Eventually, Viking's area of operations embraced Long Beach and Port Hueneme, California, as well as the San Diego area.

Relieved by the rescue and salvage ship USS Gear (ARS-34) as salvage vessel for the 11th Naval District, Viking was returned to Navy custody by the Merritt, Chapman, and Scott salvage firm. On 17 March 1953, she was authorized for disposal, and her name was struck from the Navy list on 19 April 1953. She lay at the Naval Supply Depot at San Pedro until sold on 22 July 1953 to Nathan Cohen and Son, Inc., of Los Angeles, California. She was scrapped soon thereafter.
