= USS Auk (AM-38) =

Minesweeper of the United States Navy

Coordinates: 10.468322°N 67.983308°W

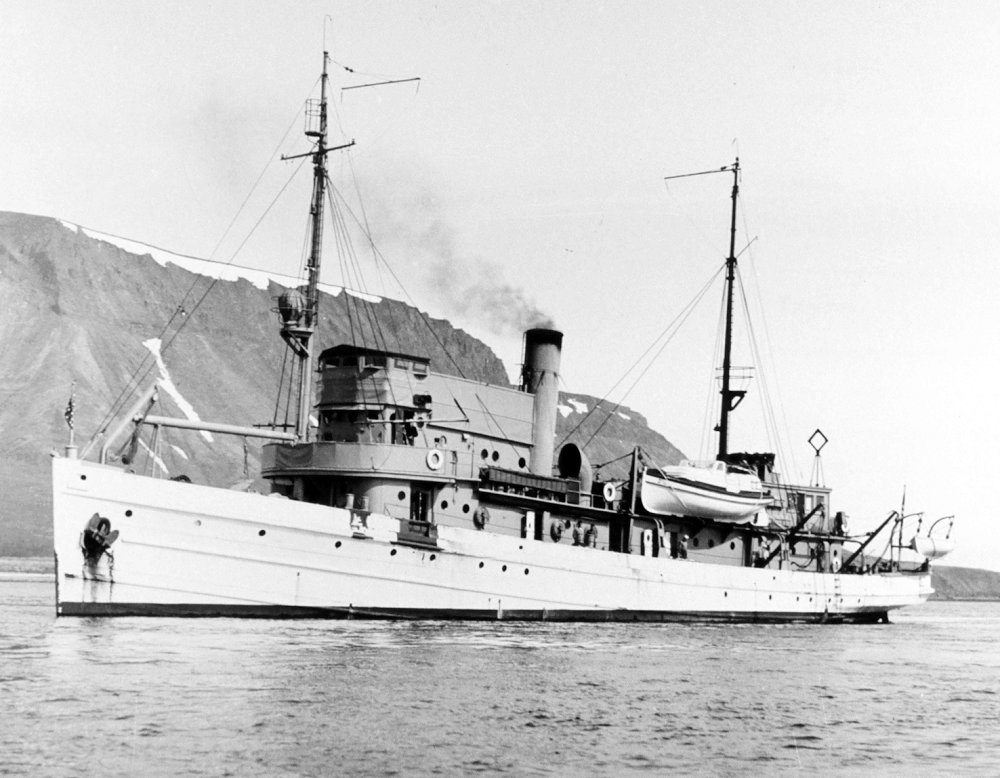
- About 1935 in the Aleutian Islands

History

United States
- Cost: $594,332 (hull and machinery)
- Laid down: 20 June 1918
- Launched: 28 September 1918
- Commissioned: 31 January 1919
- Stricken: 28 January 1947
- Identification: pennant number AM–38
- Fate: Sold to Venezuelan Navy

Venezuela
- Name: Felipe Larrazabal
- Acquired: 9 June 1947
- Decommissioned: 1962
- Identification: pennant number R-11
- Fate: abandoned

General characteristics
- Displacement: 950 long tons (970 t)
- Length: 187 ft 10 in (57.25 m)
- Beam: 35 ft 6 in (10.82 m)
- Draught: 9 ft 9 in (2.97 m) (mean)
- Propulsion: triple-expansion engine, one shaft
- Speed: 14 knots (26 km/h)
- Complement: 82
- Armament: Two .30-cal (7.62 mm) Lewis guns

USS Auk (AM-38) was a Lapwing-class minesweeper acquired by the United States Navy after World War I to remove mines that had been placed during the war.

The first ship to be named Auk by the Navy, Minesweeper No. 38 was laid down on 20 June 1918 at New York City by the Todd Shipyard Corp.; launched on 28 September 1918; sponsored by Miss Nan McArthur Beattie daughter of a Todd Shipyard foremen, and commissioned at the New York Navy Yard on 31 January 1919.

Between World War I and World War II, Auk was converted into a survey vessel for the Coast and Geodetic Survey, and was renamed USS Discoverer (ARS-3) as well as USC&GS Discoverer.

== World War I-related service ==
On completion of her initial fitting out and dock trials, Auk proceeded to Tompkinsville, Staten Island, on the afternoon of 24 February reporting to Minesweeping Division, 3d Naval District. On 2 March, Auk sailed for Newport, Rhode Island, in company with USS Curlew (AM-8) (Minesweeper No. 8) and arrived there the next morning. Returning to the Mine Sweeping Base at New York on the morning of the 6th, Auk left New York waters the following afternoon, bound for Boston, Massachusetts.

=== Surviving a savage North Atlantic storm ===
The minesweeper, rolling and pitching heavily as the winds and seas rose, was proceeding on her coastwise voyage when, in the predawn darkness of the 0000-0400 watch on 8 March, men in the crews' compartment detected water entering their space at an alarming rate. While some of the crew bailed doggedly, others rigged a "handy billy", and, later, a wrecking pump, in an effort to cope with the flooding. With water coming on board faster than it could be removed the ship sought refuge.

Auk accordingly altered course at 0905 and plunged through the rough seas and a curtain of fog, while her foghorn blared its warning. She anchored that afternoon, but waves breaking over the after deck foiled attempts to rig the heavy-duty wrecking pumps into the after hold (into which the water was coming, through the rudder stock) since it was impossible to remove the hatch without allowing more water to get below in the process. Then just as the fog began to lift to the northward and the ship prepared to weigh anchor and get underway, the anchor engine jammed. Quick repairs enabled Auk's men to begin the process of hoisting up the hook, and the minesweeper got underway and eventually reached safe haven in the lee of Montauk Point.

She reached the Boston Navy Yard at 1115 on the 11th and moored alongside sister ship USS Oriole (AM-7) (Minesweeper No. 7). Auk remained there for over a month, undergoing repairs and fitting out for her pending duty sweeping the North Sea Mine Barrage. During this time, paravanes ("Burney Gear") were installed in the ship and she underwent necessary upkeep. She departed the yard late on the afternoon of 14 April, standing out of President Roads to anchor for the night off Provincetown, Massachusetts.

On the morning of 15 April, after calibrating her compasses Auk got underway for the Orkney Islands, joining three of her sister ships: USS Heron (AM-10) (Minesweeper No. 10), USS Sanderling (AM-37) (Minesweeper No. 37), and Oriole. All went well until two days from their destination, when steering gear problems briefly disabled first Heron, and then Auk; each time Oriole's took them under tow. Ultimately, the four minesweepers reached Kirkwall, Orkney Islands, on 29 April 1919, shortly after the Minesweeping Detachment flagship, the destroyer tender USS Black Hawk (AD-9) (Destroyer Tender No. 9), had arrived to establish headquarters there for the ensuing operations.

=== Mine clearance ===
Among the last of the minesweepers to reach the Orkney Islands Auk missed the first, experimental, mine clearance (29 April to 2 May). However, Auk suffered the first fatality of the operation on 3 May when a crewman was fatally crushed while unreeling sweep wire from the drum of the anchor engine. A Naval Board of Inquiry which met to ascertain the particulars of the death of the boatswain's mate recommended that safety guards be installed on that equipment in all sweepers to prevent similar accidents.

Over the next five months, Auk and her sister ships - together with a group of 110-foot subchasers ((SC's)) supported by an Allied flotilla of British and American logistics and repair ships and loaned British Admiralty naval trawlers - carried out the dangerous task of sweeping some 55,000 mines sown in 1918 between the coasts of Scotland and Norway to contain the German U-boats in the North Sea. Auk spent over 95 days on the minefields in the often "dirty" weather associated with the North Sea as they carried out their unprecedented mission of clearing the sea lanes to permit a resumption of civilian commerce in the wake of World War I.

=== Tow wire wraps around Auk's prop ===
Underway from Kirkwall at 0600 on 10 May, Auk took SC-46 in tow and proceeded to the minefields in company with Oriole, Heron, and Sanderling, each in turn towing a chaser. While she was passing sweep wire to Oriole, the line snagged in Auk''s propeller. Oriole took her sister ship in tow, but soon turned over the towing to USS Robin (AM-3) (Minesweeper No. 3), which took Auk to Lerwick, in the Shetland Islands. There, British divers from the tender Edna removed the sweep wire on 13 May.

=== Continued minesweeping after repairs ===
Auk returned to the minefields and teamed with Oriole to conduct a sweep on the afternoon of the 14th. During her first pass she cut loose three mines, one fouling the "kite" astern and the other two fouling the line itself. Over the next few days, Auk carried out the repetitious task of sweeping, again in company with Oriole. Auk had a near miss on the 15th when a mine exploded nearby.

The minesweeper varied her daily routine in the minefields - which lasted into late May by escorting SC-356 to Lerwick and back on 17 and 18 May. During the latter half of the month, Auk teamed with, on different occasions, Oriole, USS Swan (AM-34) (Minesweeper No. 34), or USS Kingfisher (AM-25) (Minesweeper No. 25). Returning to Kirkwall on 29 May, Auk refueled there from the British tanker Aspenleaf.

=== Damaged in third barrage clearance operation ===
During June, Auk participated in the third clearance operation on the barrage, getting underway from Kirkwall for the minefields on 5 June and returning to port on the 27th. She broke up the routine with brief visits to Kirkwall and Otterswick (9 and 12 June, respectively), but spent most of the month on the barrage. This time around, her sweeping partners included the familiar Oriole, Robin, and USS Swallow (AM-4) (Minesweeper No. 4). On 21 June. a mine exploded 50 yards astern tripped the generators (plunging the engine and fire rooms into darkness) and knocked down part of the brick walls in her two boilers. but she resumed sweeping operations the next day.

=== Auk serves as flagship ===
During the next two minesweeping operations that followed Auk served as the flagship for the detachment commander, Capt. Roscoe C. Bulmer, a highly regarded man, revered by the men he commanded. Capt. Bulmer embarked for the first time at Kirkwall on 7 July 1919 when he broke his broad pennant in Auk shortly before she proceeded to sea. That day, she teamed with Oriole in sweeping a portion of the field that had been laid on 13 October of the previous year and, on the following day, swept in company with USS Eider (AM-17) (Minesweeper No. 17).

=== Mine damage to several ships ===
A chronicler of the North Sea Mine Barrage clearance wrote about 9 July: "...misfortune did not rain; it poured". Mines damaged three minesweepers, the tug, USS Patuxent (AT-11), and a subchaser. Again sweeping in company with Eider, Auk hit a mine at 0925 that detonated another mine 25 yards (23 m) off her starboard bow in a chain reaction; there was also a third explosion (probably caused by the second) 30 yards astern, carrying away the sweep and resulting in the loss of a "kite" and 70 fathoms (130 m) of wire.

=== Auk tries to rescue Pelican, damaged by mines ===
At 1000, an upper level mine exploded beneath USS Pelican (AM-27) (Minesweeper No. 27), which in turn triggered five simultaneous countermines around her. Pelican heavily hit, battered, and holed, assumed a list before beginning to settle. Auk, with Capt. Bulmer directing the rescue operations, immediately altered course to close with her sister ship.

Passing a line at 1008, within 10 minutes of the explosions, she drew alongside Pelican. After one hose line parted, Auk passed another to aid Pelican in pumping out the rapidly rising water below-decks. However, the rough seas repeatedly slammed the ships together, damaging lines and hoses and forcing their replacement. At 1054, USS Teal (AM-23) (Minesweeper No. 23) passed a towline and began moving ahead with the crippled Pelican, in turn tethered to Auk, astern.

Eider fell in with the group as it labored ahead, securing to Pelican's starboard side, Eider and Auk acting much in the fashion of waterwings, keeping their sister ship afloat between them. Difficulties soon arose, however, as the ships struggled toward Orkney. A head sea sprang up, tossing the minecraft about and straining moorings and hose lines. Pump lines were carried away and Pelican began to settle further by the bow. The pressure of the water in the flooded forward compartments in the damaged ship now buckled and distorted the forward fireroom bulkhead, the only barrier that could save Pelican from sinking.

At 2300, Capt. Bulmer ordered most of Pelican''s crew transferred to Eider. A dozen volunteers chosen from the crew remained on board Pelican. Gradually, however, the pumps of Auk and Eider, working full capacity after the lines had been repaired and again placed in operation, succeeded in lowering Pelican''s waterline. The battle to keep Pelican afloat continued on into the night and into the predawn darkness, men standing by with axes to chop through the mooring lines should Pelican give any indication of imminent sinking.

Finally, on the morning of 10 July, the valiant little flotilla limped into Tresness Bay where Auk's pumps continued to help lower her sister ship's waterline even further.

Underway to return to Kirkwall at 1726, Auk reached her destination a little over four hours later and Capt. Bulmer (whose seamanship many credited with having saved Pelican) disembarked. The next day Auk took Rear Admiral Elliott Strauss, Commander, Mine Force, from Kirkwall to Inverness, Scotland, before she returned to Kirkwall, ready to resume operations.

=== Captain Bulmer killed in an auto accident ===
Shortly after midnight on 22 July, Capt. Bulmer transferred his command pennant from Black Hawk to Auk and wore it in the ship as she teamed with Oriole during the detachment's fifth mine clearance operation. Capt. Bulmer disembarked for the last time at 0017 on 1 August and, tragically, just three days later suffered severe injuries in an automobile accident. He died on 5 August, and his loss was felt tremendously throughout the detachment, since his intrepid personality had stamped itself on the force and inspired it during his time in command.

=== Auk loses another boatswain's mate to the sea ===
Auk subsequently took part in two additional minesweeping operations that lasted through late September, drawing her participation in this epic venture to a close when she anchored at Kirkwall on 26 September 1919. During the first of these missions (mid-to-late August), Auk ranged as far as the coast of Norway, touching at the ports of Stavanger and Hangeand, and Bommel Fjord. During this operation, Auk suffered her second fatality: at 0715 on 31 August a kite wire, jumping out of a chock, knocked Boatswain's Mate 1st Class Lee A. Singleton over the side. Auk immediately commenced maneuvering to pick him up, cutting the sweep wire, throwing over a life buoy, and hoisting the man overboard signal, but a one-hour search failed to find the missing man.

=== Repaired at Invergordon from mine damage ===
Drydocked at Invergordon on 2 and 3 September to repair damage suffered when mines exploded close aboard on 30 August, Auk performed local tug and towing duties at Kirkwall in mid-September before resuming operations in the minefields later that month.

== European tour after completion of North Sea work ==
After completing her work in the North Sea, Auk, her sister ships, and the support craft that had serviced them headed for home. Underway from Kirkwall on 1 October, Auk reached Plymouth, England, on the 5th, and underwent voyage repairs there until the 16th, when she left the British Isles and headed for the coast of France reaching Brest on the morning of the 17th. After steaming from there to Lisbon, Portugal, for a brief period of upkeep alongside Black Hawk, Auk began her homeward voyage on the afternoon of 24 October.

Auk refueling at sea from Black Hawk while approaching Bermuda on 11 November, an event necessitated by the discovery two days before that the after peak tank had leaked salt water, thus contaminating the oil. Reducing speed to conserve fuel, Auk was taken in tow by Swallow later that day, the former hoisting sail to help in keeping on course. On the morning of the 10th, Auk went alongside Black Hawk in an attempt at underway replenishment, only to have the fuel hose carry away and foul the minesweeper's propeller. Black Hawk then towed Auk throughout the night. In another attempt at refueling between 0925 and 1115 the next morning, Auk took on board 20 tons of oil and reached Grassy Bay, Bermuda, six hours later.

== The Secretary of the Navy welcomes minesweepers back to the States ==
Auk reached Tompkinsville, Staten Island, on 19 November. Anchoring in the North River on 21 November, near her old sweeping partner, Oriole, Auk lay in that waterway when Secretary of the Navy Josephus Daniels reviewed the assembled mine force sweepers, chasers, and tenders. On the 24th, from the deck of USS Meredith (DD-165) (Destroyer No. 165). Daniels reported: "Upon their return to the United States they [the ships of the Minesweeping Detachment] were given a welcome as genuine as when our dreadnoughts returned from service abroad" and "voiced the country's appreciation of the magnificent and successful completion of that most hazardous and strenuous operation."

== Between the wars activity and inactivity ==
The Minesweeping Detachment was demobilized, and its ships scattered throughout the fleet. Auk departed Tompkinsville on the morning of 27 November and, with USS Quail (AM-15) (Minesweeper No. 15), proceeded up the eastern seaboard, reaching Portsmouth, New Hampshire, on the afternoon of the 28th. During a year in which she remained inactive at Portsmouth, Auk was given the alphanumeric hull designation AM 38 on 17 July 1920. She was placed "in ordinary," with no crew on board, on 28 December 1920. Although still inactive, Auk was assigned to Division 1 Minesweeping Squadron, on 8 January 1921.

== United States Coast and Geodetic Survey career ==
While Auk lay in reserve, the Coast and Geodetic Survey found itself in urgent need of ships to replace those which, for reasons of age or unsuitability for the work to be performed, had been disposed of. Under the terms of the Executive Order of 12 October 1921, Auk and USS Osprey (AM-29) - renamed USC&GS Discoverer and USC&GS Pioneer, respectively – were taken to the Boston Navy Yard and transferred to the Coast and Geodetic Survey on 7 April 1922.

Discoverer served in the Coast and Geodetic Survey as a survey ship until the summer of 1941, primarily in the waters of the Territory of Alaska.

== World War II operations ==
With the expansion of the American Navy during this time between the outbreak of war in Europe and the entry of the United States in the conflict (1939 to 1941), that service cast about for auxiliary vessels to support the growing number of combatant ships.

Executive Order of 19 June 1941 authorized the Navy to take USC&GS Discoverer over for service as a salvage ship. The ship concluded her last operations with the Coast and Geodetic Survey in the summer of 1941 having worked out of Dutch Harbor, Cold Bay, Women's Bay, and Kodiak since the previous spring—and departed Ketchikan on 22 July 1941, bound for Seattle and turnover to the Navy.

Arriving at Seattle on 25 July, Discoverer—the retention of her name by the Navy approved on 5 August 1941. On the afternoon of 26 August Lt. Comdr. E. Froberg accepted custody of the ship. Assigned to the Lake Union plant, at Seattle, in October 1941 for degaussing and conversion, Discoverer was classified as ARS, the work was still in progress when the Japanese attacked the U.S. Pacific Fleet at Pearl Harbor on 7 December 1941.

Delivered to salvage firm of Merritt, Chapman and Scott, Inc., who were to operate the vessel under a contract let by the Bureau of Ships, on 16 February 1942, Discoverer was based in familiar waters throughout hostilities with Japan, her ports of call including Kodiak, Dutch Harbor, Cold Bay, Nome, and Women's Bay.

Discoverer assisted the U.S. Coast Guard-manned transport USS Arthur Middleton (AP-55) which had run aground while rescuing survivors from the wrecked USS Worden (DD-352) which had previously run aground herself at Amchitka on 12 January 1943. After bearing an almost charmed life while in the Coast Survey, operating in the tricky waters of the Alaska coastline, Discoverer sustained serious bottom damage when she grounded off the coast of Prince Rupert Island on 20 November 1943 and required assistance from the Navy tug USS Tatnuck (ATO-27).

== Post-World War II activity ==
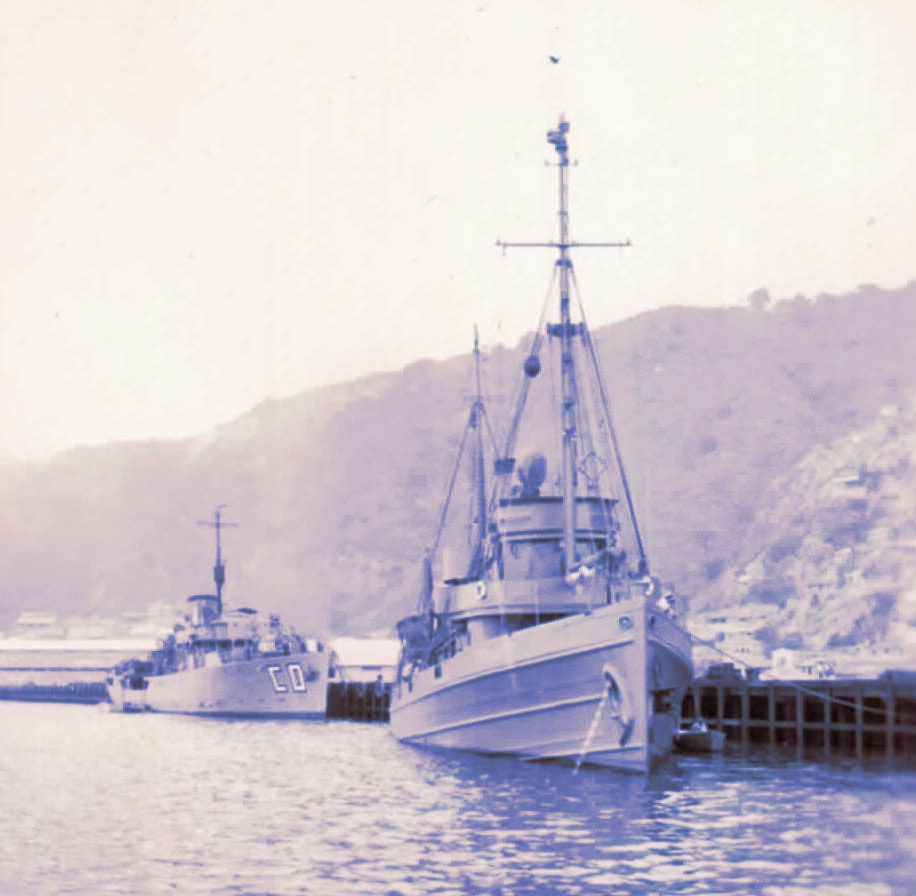
Felipe Larrazabal seen in 1952, with the Flower-class corvette Constitución behind.

Following repairs, Discoverer remained with Merritt, Chapman, and Scott into 1946. After it had been recommended on 18 November 1946 that the ship be struck from the Navy list and turned over to the Maritime Commission for "disposal as a usable vessel," indicating that to some, the venerable minesweeper, survey ship and salvage vessel still had some years left. Discoverer was withdrawn from service the day after Christmas of 1946 and her name was struck from the Navy list on 28 January 1947.

Auk was sold to the government of Venezuela on 9 June 1947 and renamed Felipe Larrazabal (R-11). The ship was decommissioned in 1962 and eventually abandoned at Puerto Cabello, Venezuela where the hulk is visible as of 2015.
