= Davidson Seamount =

Underwater volcano near California

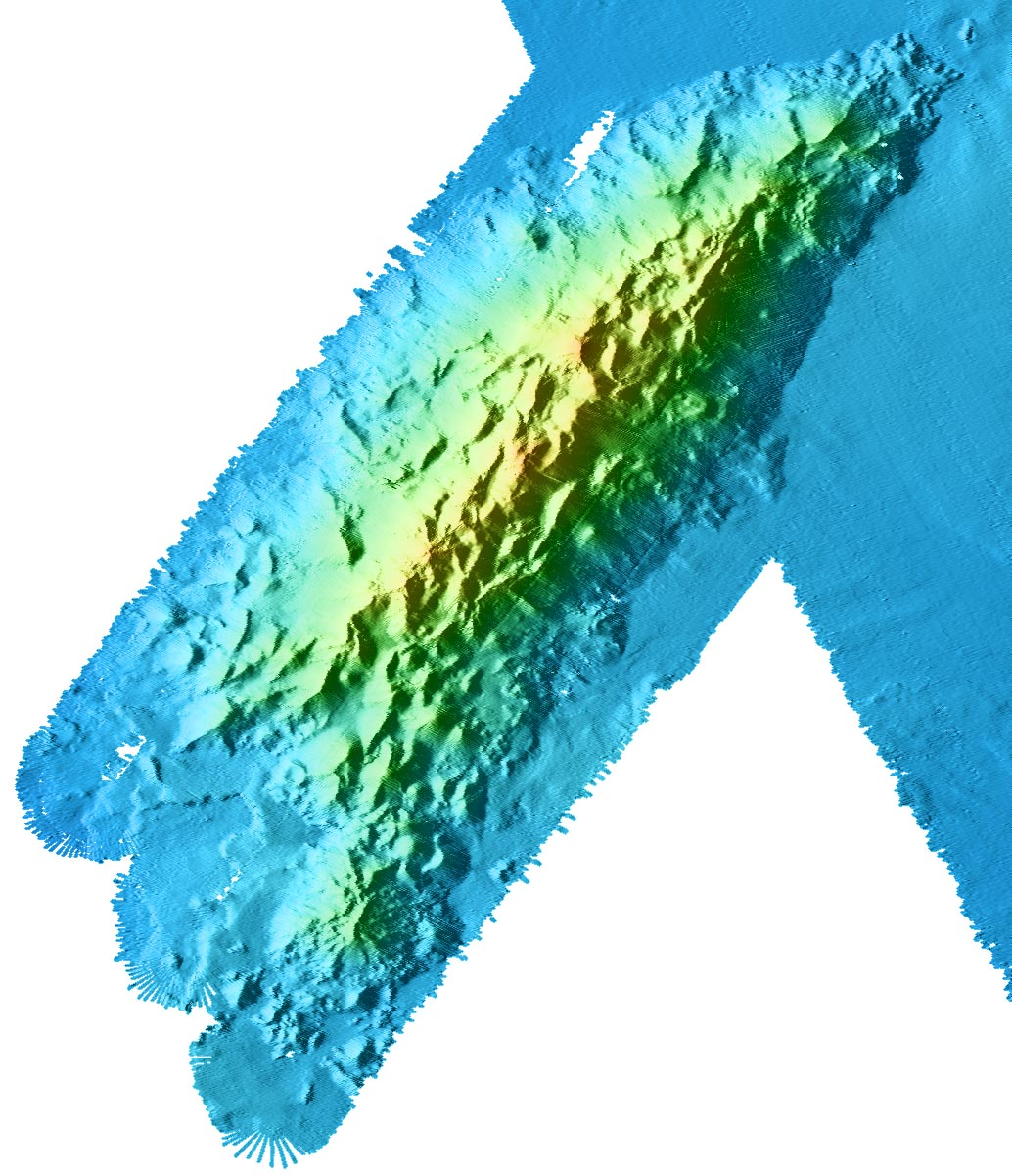
- Bathymetric map of Davidson Seamount.

- Location within California
- Summit depth: 4,101 ft (1,250 m)
- Height: 7,480 ft (2,280 m)

Location
- Coordinates: 35°43′N 122°43′W
- Country: California, United States

Geology
- Type: Seamount (underwater volcano)
- Age of rock: 9–15 million years
- Last eruption: ~9.8 million years ago

History
- Discovery date: 1933

Bathymetry of Monterey Bay, showing Monterey Canyon. Davidson Seamount is visible to the southwest on the abyssal plain.

Davidson Seamount is a seamount (underwater volcano) located off the coast of Central California, 80 mi (129 km) southwest of Monterey and 75 mi (121 km) west of San Simeon. At 26 mi (42 km) long and 8 mi (13 km) wide, it is one of the largest known seamounts in the world. From base to crest, the seamount is 7,480 ft (2,280 m) tall, yet its summit is still 4,101 ft (1,250 m) below the sea surface. The seamount is biologically diverse, with 237 species and 27 types of deep-sea coral having been identified.

Discovered during the mapping of California's coast in 1933, Davidson Seamount is named after geographer George Davidson of the United States Coast and Geodetic Survey. Studied only sparsely for decades, NOAA expeditions to the seamount in 2002 and 2006 shed light upon its unique deep-sea coral ecosystem. Davidson Seamount is populated by a dense population of large, ancient corals, some over 100 years old. The data gathered during the studies led to the Davidson Seamount being added to the Monterey Bay National Marine Sanctuary in 2008.

== Geology ==
A seamount is an underwater volcano; Davidson rises 7,480 ft (2,280 m) above the surrounding ocean floor. Although there are over 30,000 seamounts in the Pacific Ocean alone, only about 0.1% of them have been explored. The aqueous environment of the seamount means that it behaves differently from volcanoes on land. Its surface is mostly blocky lava flows, with some pillow lava, more typical of a seamount, prevailing at its deeper flanks. The summit is composed of layered volcanic ash and pyroclastic material. These rocks indicate mildly explosive eruptions of gas-rich lava near the summit. The base is likely buried in a deep layers of muds.

At 26 mi (42 km) long and 8 mi (13 km) wide, Davidson Seamount would dominate the landscape similar to Mount Shasta. Put in perspective, the size of the seamount is enough to fill Monterey Bay from the Santa Cruz boardwalk to Monterey's Fishermen's Wharf.

Davidson Seamount is part of a group of seamounts off the continental margin, including Guide, Pioneer, Gumdrop, and Rodriguez seamounts, all located roughly between 37.5° and 34.0° latitude. This group is morphologically unique, yet very similar to one another. All the seamounts in the group are complex northeast-southwest trending structures, consisting of parallel ridges separated by sediment-filled troughs. The ridges constructed run parallel to an ancient spreading center which has since been replaced in its role by the San Andreas Fault system. They are unique in this origin, as they are formed from the remnants of an old ocean-ridge spreading center. A series of "knobs" are aligned with the ridges; however the distinctive summit crater, evident in many oceanic volcanoes, is absent. This lack of a collapse crater suggests that magma was never stored in a chamber within the structure, as with most other volcanoes.

Analysis of argon–argon dating studies indicate that Davidson formed between 9 and 15 million years ago, 5 to 12 million years after the formation of the overlaying oceanic crust.

== Ecology ==
Studies have indicated that a seamount functions as an "oasis of life," with a higher species count and more biodiversity than the surrounding seafloor. Although previous analysis has stressed the exceptionalism of the seamount habitat, recent biological analysis, much of it centered on Davidson Seamount, has indicated that this does not necessarily translate into a higher endemic percentage. However, it is believed that they provide a refuge for rare species that have difficulty surviving elsewhere.

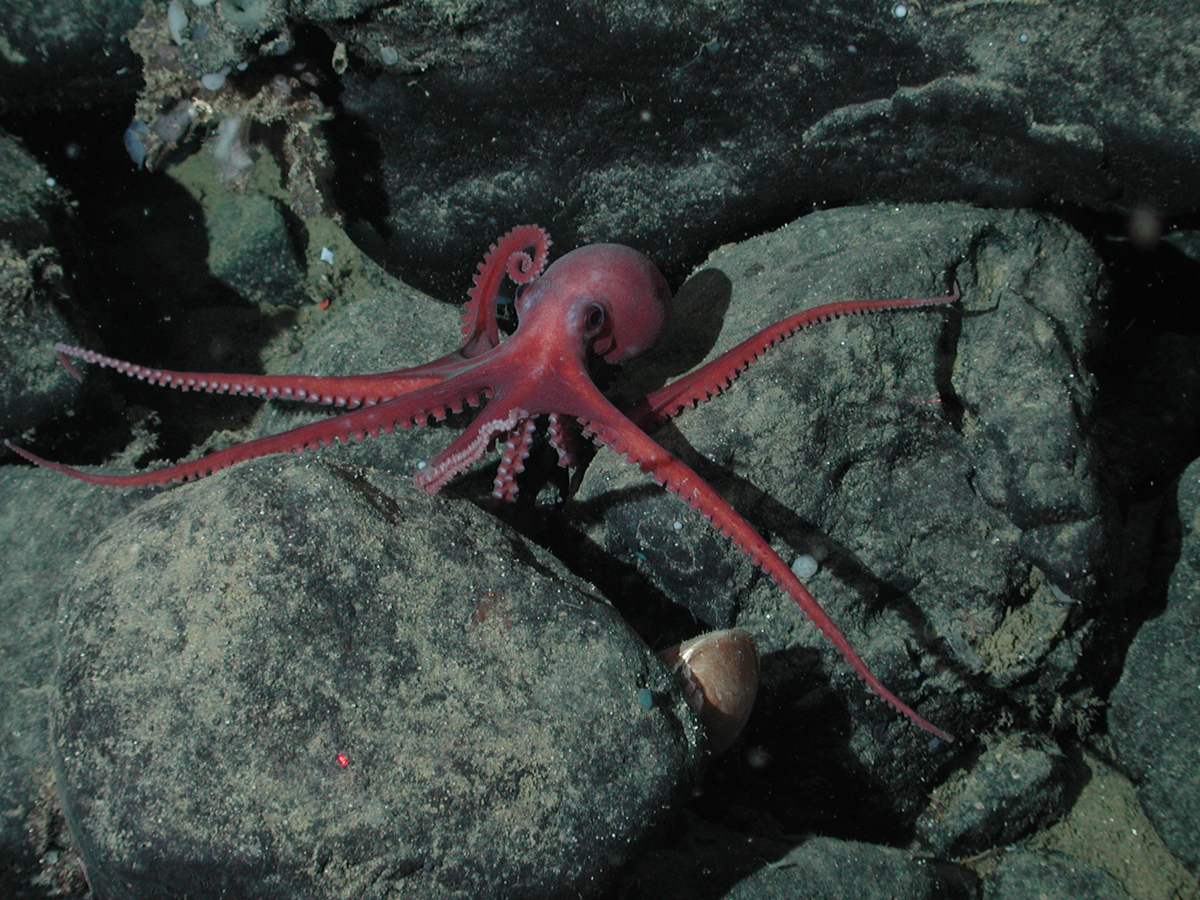
Benthoctopus sp. and a clam near the summit of Davidson Seamount, 1,461 m (4,793 ft) deep.

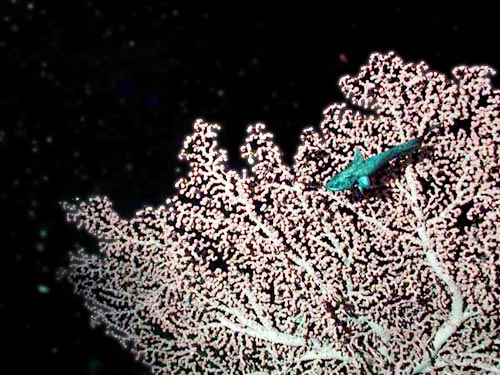
Grenadier fish (Coryphaenoides sp.) in front of bubblegum coral (Paragorgia arborea) on the crest of Davidson Seamount, at 1,255 m (4,117 ft) deep. Paragorgia grow to over 2.5 m (8 ft) tall on Davidson; they also grow in Monterey Canyon, but are generally smaller and less abundant.

There are reasons that seamounts are biologically important. They rise high in the water column, creating complex current patterns that support life on, around, and above the seamount. The surface of the seamount also provides a substrate upon which organisms can attach themselves and grow. This in turn supports the species that feed on them, in turn supporting the whole ecological food web. Scientists have found that seamounts often provide a habitat for endemic species that are not found anywhere else.

Davidson Seamount is among the best biologically described seamounts worldwide. Six major expeditions to the volcano have yielded over 60,000 species observations. As of 2009 scientists have observed and recorded 168 species of megafauna on the seamount. Of these, about 7% of the species at Davidson are endemic, meaning they live only at Davidson. 71% of the species can be confidently classified as cosmopolitan (widespread), and sufficient data exists for 22% of the observed species to strongly suggest that their range is not limited to seamounts. The remaining 7% have only been seen in video footage. Thirteen species have been identified in other areas, but never in other seamounts.

The seamount is populated by a large variety of deep-sea corals, most of which in turn provide a habitat for other species. It has in the past been called "An Oasis in the Deep", hosting a vast coral forest, large sponge field, crabs, deep-sea fish, basket stars, and a number of rare benthic species, some of which have yet to be studied properly or even named. These are all cold-water species, as the temperature even at the top of the seamount is just above freezing—around 2 °C (36 °F), as compared to 14 °C (57 °F) at the ocean's surface.

Despite its size, the top of Davidson Seamount remains over 4,500 ft (1,372 m) below the ocean's surface. This great depth means that the habitats that the seamount supports have not been significantly disturbed by human activity; anchoring and trawling typically does not occur below a depth of 1,500 ft (457 m), and waste disposal and discharge occurs much closer to shore.

In comparisons drawn to the nearby Monterey Bay National Marine Sanctuary, the two were shown to be very different biologically. Species that are rare in Monterey Bay are common on Davidson, and vice versa.

=== Deep-sea coral ===
The ecology on Davidson Seamount is dominated by an extensive "forest" of ancient deep-sea coral and sponges, some of which are over 100 years old. Although these species also grow elsewhere, they are generally sparsely distributed and far smaller and younger than the coral growth on Davidson. Conversely, sea cucumbers, which are very common on the walls of Monterey Canyon, are all but absent on Davidson, an example of the polarity between Davidson and Monterey Bay.

Researchers speculate that Davidson Seamount is an ideal habitat for deep-sea corals and sponges because it has favorable bottom rock (bare lava rock), a steady food supply (supplied by a water current favoring the seamount; see the section above), and has not been disturbed by strong bottom currents than often bother other seafloor areas.

Craig McClain, one of the scientists studying the seamount, told PhysOrg:

"The large groves of corals and sponges are unique to seamounts. The crests of seamounts are particularly good because they provide flat rocky surfaces that don't accumulate much sediment. This is partly due to the fact that seamounts are so far offshore. In contrast when you look at the seafloor in Monterey Canyon, it's mucky. That makes it tough for filter feeders, especially sponges. Any flat surface in the canyon collects mud. This makes it tough for corals to settle anywhere except on near-vertical surfaces. Just staying attached to these surfaces can be a challenge in itself."

Research also suggests that seamounts such as Davidson Seamount may be ecologically valuable to rare species that use them as breeding grounds. The seamounts are likely to be a source of larvae that maintains the population of the species in nearby, sub-optimal areas, known as "sinks." Sinks are low-lying areas in which species can live, but do so very poorly; if they are not replenished by nearby population centers, such as at Davidson, they could disappear from the area entirely. DNA studies may in the future help scientists prove seamounts are indeed sources of larvae for their surrounding seafloor.

== History ==
=== Exploration ===
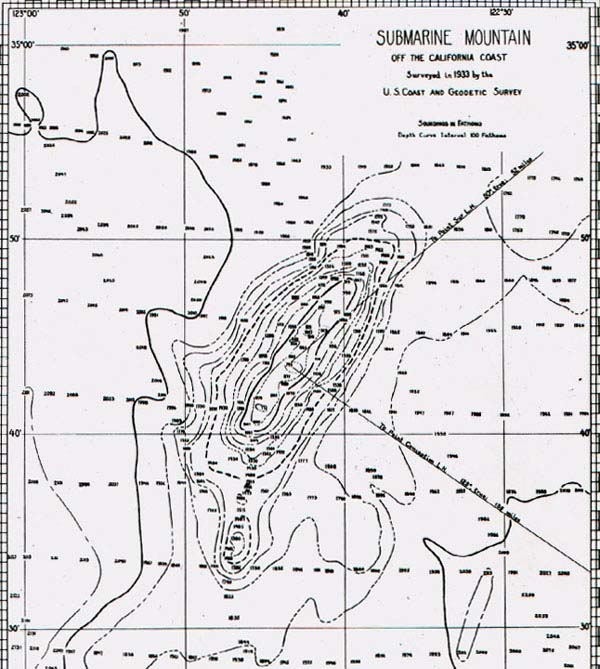
1933 map of Davidson Seamount

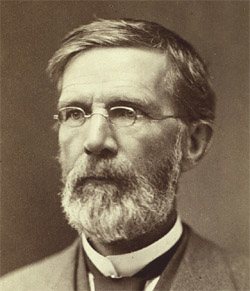
George Davidson, for whom the seamount was named.

Davidson Seamount was initially discovered and mapped in 1933. Davidson Seamount was the first underwater volcano to be classified as "seamount" by the United States Board of Geographic Names, in 1938, and was named in honor of the United States Coast and Geodetic Survey scientist George Davidson, one of the key figures in the survey of America's west coast.

Because of its great depth, for a long time Davidson Seamount had been preceded only by a sparse few investigations. Davidson is interesting to volcanologists because of its unique geology, and to biologists for its unique ecology. In 2002 the NOAA sponsored the first modern in-depth study of the seamount. The team included scientists, educators, and resource managers, with the goal of documenting species, taking geologic samples, and describing the ocean environment. The expedition documented many rare, previously undiscovered species that exist nowhere else, not even on nearby seamounts, including ancient coral gardens that are vulnerable to human activity.

Recent expeditions to Davidson have focused on its ecology, and specifically on the variety of deep-sea corals, some over 100 years old, that live on its banks. These large colonies are extremely fragile to human interaction. Davidson's proximity to scientific research institutions has helped its exploration, as multiple dives, mappings, and studies have made it one of the better-studied seamounts in the world.

In 2006, another exploration, a collaboration of the Monterey Bay National Marine Sanctuary, the Monterey Bay Aquarium Research Institute (MBARI), and Moss Landing Marine Laboratories was undertaken, mainly to test a model that had been developed to predict the availability of coral and to advance the understanding of the seamount's deep-sea coral. The NOAA outlined a set of 4 goals for the expedition:

- Understand why deep-sea corals live where they do on the seamount
- Determine the age and growth patterns of the bamboo coral
- Improve the species list and taxonomy of corals from the seamount
- Share the exciting experience with the public through television and the Internet

Scientific data on the water currents and food availability of the seamount was collected, as was information on the age and growth patterns of the corals themselves. The British Broadcasting Corporation (BBC) filmed the cruise for their series, Planet Earth. A total of 70 hours of observations and 102 deep-sea animal and rock specimens were collected during the cruise. The expedition, which lasted from January 26 through February 4, made use if the MBARI's research vessel Western Flyer and the ROV Tiburon.

=== As a marine sanctuary ===
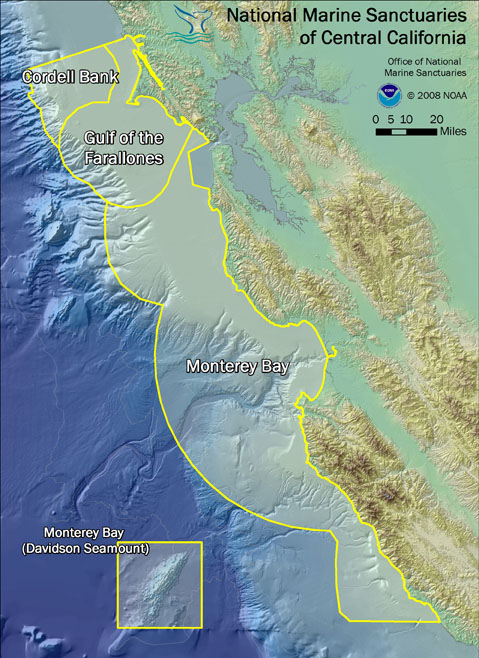
Diagram illustrating the orientation of the 3 marine sanctuaries of Central California: Cordell Bank, Gulf of the Farallones, and Monterey Bay. Davidson Seamount, part of the Monterey Bay sanctuary, at bottom-left.

Following the information learned from the 2002 and 2006 expeditions, there was public support for the making of Davidson Seamount into a marine sanctuary. A key group of research scientists, fishermen, officials, educators, and marine biologists was formed in 2006 to discuss whether or not to make Davidson Seamount a National Marine Sanctuary under the National Marine Sanctuaries Act, and if so whether to make it its own sanctuary, or incorporate it into the nearby Monterey Bay National Marine Sanctuary. The group decided that the seamount was eligible for sanctuary designation, and the majority of the group recommended its incorporation into the nearby Monterey Bay sanctuary.

The Monterey Bay advisory group concurred with the findings, and submitted its approval to the NOAA, with whom the final decision rested. In a press release dated November 20, 2008, the NOAA finalized its approval of the plans, and expanded Monterey Bay National Marine Sanctuary by a total of 775 sq mi (2,007 km^{2}) to include Davidson Seamount in its protected area. After a management plan was created, Davidson Seamount was incorporated into Monterey Bay in 2009, 7 years after it was originally proposed.

== Oil and gas exploration ==
In July 2017, under the direction of Executive Order 13795 from President Donald Trump, the U.S. Department of Commerce began re-evaluating the status of the Monterey Bay National Marine Sanctuary, which includes the Davidson Seamount. The move was opposed by many environmentalists and residents.
