= USC&GS Pioneer (1918) =

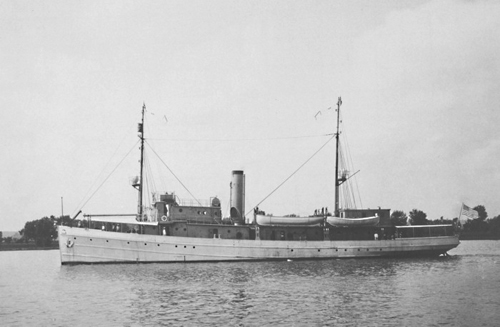
- Pioneer

History

United States
- Name: Pioneer
- Namesake: Pioneer, one who goes before, as into the wilderness, preparing the way for others to follow
- Builder: Gas Engine and Power Company, Morris Heights, New York
- Laid down: 14 November 1917
- Launched: 14 November 1918 or 19 November 1918
- Completed: January 1919
- Acquired: 7 April 1922 by U.S. Department of Commerce via transfer from U.S. Navy
- In service: 1922
- Out of service: 1941
- Nickname(s): Pioneer and survey ships USC&GS Discoverer and USC&GS Guide collectively were known as the "Bird Boats"
- Fate: Transferred to U.S. Navy 1941
- Notes: Served as United States Navy minesweeper USS Osprey (AM-29) 1919-1920; Served as U.S. Navy salvage ship USS Crusader (ARS-2) 1941-1947; Decommissioned and transferred to Maritime Administration for disposal 1947; Sold April 1952

General characteristics
- Type: Survey ship
- Length: 187 ft (57 m)
- Beam: 35.6 ft (10.9 m)
- Draft: 12.6 ft (3.8 m)
- Installed power: 1,400 shaft horsepower (1.05 megawatts)
- Propulsion: Two 200-psi Babcock & Wilcox boilers; Harlan and Hollingsworth vertical triple expansion engine; one shaft
- Speed: 14 knots

USC&GS Pioneer was a survey ship that served in the United States Coast and Geodetic Survey from 1922 to 1941. She was the first ship of the Coast and Geodetic Survey to bear the name.

== Construction and United States Navy service ==
Pioneer was laid down as the United States Navy minesweeper USS Osprey (Minesweeper No. 29) by Gas Engine and Power Company at Morris Heights, New York, on 14 November 1917. She was launched on either 14 November 1918 or 19 November 1918 and was commissioned on 7 January 1919.

Osprey assisted in sweeping the North Sea Mine Barrage in 1919. She spent 1920 in ordinary at Portsmouth, New Hampshire, and was redesignated AM-29 that year. She was decommissioned at Portsmouth on 12 December 1920.

== United States Coast and Geodetic Survey career ==
In 1922 Osprey steamed to Boston, Massachusetts, where she was transferred to the U.S. Department of Commerce on 7 April 1922. She entered service in the U.S. Coast and Geodetic Survey that year as the survey ship Pioneer. Pioneer and survey ships USC&GS Discoverer—formerly the U.S. Navy minesweeper USS Auk (AM-38)—and USC&GS Guide—formerly the U.S. Navy minesweeper USS Flamingo (AM-32)—were collectively known in the Coast and Geodetic Survey as the "Bird Boats" because of their former Navy names. Pioneer spent her Coast and Geodetic Survey career on duties on the United States West Coast and in the Territory of Alaska.

Tragedy struck Pioneer on 11 October 1928 when a member of her crew -- Seaman Earl Forsberg—fell overboard and drowned during a survey of Heceta Bank off the coast of Oregon.

In 1934 personnel aboard Pioneer developed a deep sea hydrophone in connection with the Survey's work developing radio acoustic ranging, a system in which a small TNT bomb timed to explode at about 100 ft (30 m) feet, (Note: This was the surface channel, not the deeper SOFAR channel.) the explosion's sound wave is registered by a hydrophone aboard and hydrophones at two or more known shore locations that then send a radio signal of arrival time back to the vessel for range calculation, to better establish positions beyond shore signal visibility. Pioneer personnel successfully used the hydrophone to a depth of 5,100 ft (1,600 m) off the coast of southern California in the work establishing the velocity and path of sound in the sea.

During her career, Pioneer occasionally rendered assistance to mariners in distress and assisted civil authorities ashore. On 28 November 1934, she sighted a yacht flying a distress signal; closing to investigate, she found that the yacht had a disabled engine and took it in tow off Point Vicente, California. On 20 December 1935, she was pierside at Long Beach, California, California, when a fire broke out on the pier; her crew contained the fire until the local fire department arrived on the scene.

== Return to U.S. Navy service ==
In 1941, Pioneer was transferred back to the U.S. Navy, which commissioned her as the salvage ship USS Crusader (ARS-2). Crusader operated from the Panama Canal Zone throughout World War II. She was decommissioned in 1947 and sold in 1952.

== Commemoration ==
Two underwater geographic features of the Pacific Ocean, Pioneer Seamount and Pioneer Canyon, are named for Pioneer.
