= Guide Seamount =

Underwater volcano near California

- Location within California
- Summit depth: 1,682 m (5,518 ft)
- Height: 1,440 m (4,724 ft)
- Summit area: 130 km^{2} (50 sq mi)

Location
- Coordinates: 37°00.60′N 123°21.00′W
- Country: Central California, United States

Geology
- Type: Seamount (Underwater volcano)
- Age of rock: 16.6±0.5 million years old

Guide Seamount is a seamount in the eastern Pacific Ocean, about 16.6±0.5 million years old. It is similar in shape and orientation to the nearby Davidson, Pioneer, Rodriguez, and Gumdrop seamounts. It is named for the United States Coast and Geodetic Survey survey ship USC&GS Guide.

Guide Seamount is constructed of four nearly parallel volcanic ridges, separated by sediment-filled troughs. These are aligned parallel to magnetic anomalies in the underlying oceanic crust. It is very similar in shape and structure to the nearby Davidson Seamount, except that it is smaller, at approximately 16.5 km (10 mi) by 5 km (3 mi). It rises about 1,440 m (4,724 ft) above the seafloor and sits at depth of 1,682 m (5,518 ft).

The lavas from Guide are mostly alkalic basalt, hawaiite, mugearite with some pyroclastic flows near the top of the summit.
