= Gumdrop Seamount =

Underwater volcano off California

- Location within California
- Summit depth: 1,207 m (3,960 ft)

Location
- Location: offshore Central California
- Coordinates: 37°27.00′N 123°28.00′W
- Country: California, United States

Geology
- Type: Seamount (Underwater volcano)
- Volcanic arc/chain: Central Californian seamounts

Gumdrop Seamount is a small seamount (underwater volcano) located on the flank of Pioneer Seamount, off the coast of Central California. It is the northernmost of the related seamounts in the region, which includes Davidson, Guide, Pioneer, and Rodriguez seamounts. It is defined by a series of aligned cones, the majority of which are poorly defined, separated by troughs filled with sediments. The largest cone rises to within 1,207 m (3,960 ft) of sea level. It is estimated to have a volume of about 100 km^{3} (24 cu mi), but the poorly defined base hinders observations of its size. Samples recovered from Gumdrop are highly vesicular in origin, and include alkalic basalt, hawaiite, and mugearite; however, their ages have yet to be determined.
