= USC&GS Discoverer (1918) =

Survey ship in the US Coast and Geodetic Survey

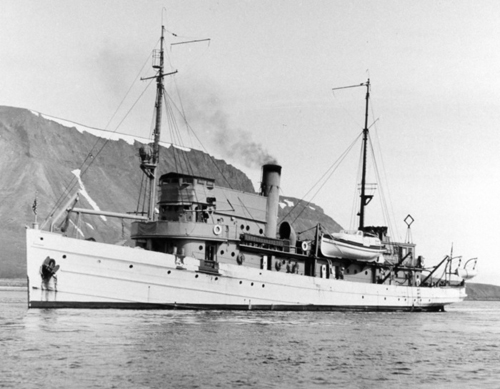
- USC&GS Discoverer in Territory of Alaska waters.

History

United States
- Name: Discoverer
- Namesake: A discoverer, a person who engages in discovery, the act of detecting and learning something
- Builder: Todd Shipyards Corporation, New York, New York
- Cost: $500,000 (USD)
- Laid down: 20 June 1918
- Launched: 28 September 1918
- Completed: January 1919
- Acquired: 7 April 1922 by U.S. Department of Commerce via transfer from U.S. Navy
- In service: 8 April 1922
- Out of service: 26 August 1941
- Nickname(s): Discoverer and survey ships USC&GS Pioneer and USC&GS Guide collectively were known as the "Bird Boats"
- Fate: Transferred to U.S. Navy 26 August 1941
- Notes: Served as United States Navy minesweeper USS Auk (AM-38) 1919-1920; Served as U.S. Navy salvage ship USS Discoverer (ARS-3) 1941-1946; Sold 1947

General characteristics
- Type: Survey ship
- Length: 180 ft (55 m) or 187 ft 10 in (57.25 m)
- Beam: 35.6 ft (10.9 m)
- Draft: 12.6 ft (3.8 m)
- Installed power: 1,400 shaft horsepower (1.05 megawatts)
- Propulsion: Two 200-psi Babcock & Wilcox boilers; Harlan and Hollingsworth vertical triple expansion engine; one shaft
- Speed: 14 knots

The first USC&GS Discoverer was a survey ship that served in the United States Coast and Geodetic Survey from 1922 to 1941.

== Construction and United States Navy career, 1919-1922 ==
Discoverer was laid down as the United States Navy minesweeper USS Auk (Minesweeper No. 38) by the Todd Shipyards Corporation at New York, New York, on 20 June 1918. She was launched on either 28 September 1918 and commissioned on 31 January 1919.

Auk assisted in sweeping the North Sea Mine Barrage in 1919. She spent 1920 in ordinary at Portsmouth, New Hampshire, and was redesignated AM-38 that year. She was decommissioned at Portsmouth on 28 December 1920.

== United States Coast and Geodetic Survey career ==
While Auk lay in reserve, the Coast and Geodetic Survey found itself in urgent need of ships to replace those which for reasons of age or unsuitability for the work to be performed had been disposed of. While ships like Auk were, in general, well-adapted to the kind of work they would be performing in the Coast and Geodetic Survey, being robust, steel-hulled ships that had proved their seaworthiness while in Navy service as minesweepers, their accommodations were too small to take care of the large surveying parties that were to be embarked on board for the hydrographic and topographic work they would perform in the survey; however, their design permitted their conversion to allow the increase in accommodation necessary for survey work. Under the terms of an Executive Order of 12 October 1921, Auk and her sister ship, the minesweeper USS Osprey (AM-29) were taken to the Boston Navy Yard at Boston, Massachusetts, and transferred to the Coast and Geodetic Survey on 7 April 1922. The Survey renamed them USC&GS Discoverer and USC&GS Pioneer respectively. While in Coast and Geodetic Survey service, Discoverer, Pioneer, and survey ship USC&GS Guide—the former Navy minesweeper USS Flamingo (AM-32)—became known as the "Bird Boats" because of their original Navy names.

On 8 April 1922, Lieutenant Commander H. A. Seran, USC&GS, took charge of Discoverer and Pioneer. Discoverer, with Lieutenant Commander Seran in command, stood out of Boston on 28 April 1922 and transited the Cape Cod Canal that day. She reached the William Cramp & Sons shipyard at Philadelphia on 29 April 1922 and soon commenced a major overhaul and conversion into a survey ship. Discoverer's metamorphosis was completed by early August 1922; and, on 9 August 1922, she got underway from Philadelphia for the Virginia Capes. Reaching Norfolk, Virginia, on 10 August 1922, she tarried there until heading out to sea on the evening of 1 September 1922. Giving the United States Atlantic Fleet — then on maneuvers in the Southern Drill Grounds — a wide berth, Discoverer steered south to Kingston, Jamaica, and steamed from there across the Gulf of Mexico, conducting sampling and surveying work along the way.

Transiting the Panama Canal on 8 October 1922, Discoverer then proceeded up the coast of Central America and Mexico and reached San Diego, California, shortly after midnight on 27 October 1922. Working out of San Diego, San Francisco, and Oakland, California, Discoverer frequented the waters of Southern California, engaged in coastal survey work, for the rest of 1922 and the early portion of 1923.

In 1923, Discoverer moved north to the waters of the Territory of Alaska, where she operated through the summer of 1925 except for with occasional visits to Seattle, Washington, or San Francisco for upkeep. In 1923 her annual maintenance took place at the Heffernan drydock in Seattle.

Discoverer's service in Alaska began in a most notable fashion. While underway for the port of Uyak, Alaska, on 6 June 1923, she picked up an SOS from the U.S. Navy minesweeper USS Cardinal (AM-6), which had become stranded on the rocks off either the southern end or east coast of Chirikof Island the previous night. Discoverer and the U.S. Navy oiler USS Cuyama (AO-3) headed for the scene. Discoverer arrived first, at 2150 hours on 6 June 1923, and dropped anchor. Training her searchlight on the stranded minesweeper, she attempted to launch a whaleboat, but the moderately rough seas to windward of Discoverer forced her to abandon the attempt. She raised her anchor at 2225 hours and crept ahead, maneuvering to make a lee for the whaleboat, until she struck a rock at 2232 hours. Lieutenant Commander Seran immediately ordered full speed astern, and Discoverer backed to a position half a nautical mile (about 0.9 kilometer) from where she had struck the rock, letting go her anchor again in 13 fathoms (78 feet or about 24 meters of water). Discoverer made no further attempt to reach Cardinal that night; but, on the morning of 7 June 1923, with the sea moderating, she lowered a whaleboat commanded by her executive officer, Lieutenant Commander Clem L. Garner, USC&GS. The whaleboat proceeded to the stranded minesweeper and returned with 17 of Cardinal's men. Meanwhile, Cuyama arrived on the scene and radioed Discoverer that she, Cuyama, could take the remaining 16 men—the commanding officer, two other officers, and 13 enlisted men—off Cardinal. However, nine of Cardinal's, men had made it to shore the previous night, and were unaccounted for. Discoverer steamed off in search of them and located them, safe and sound, awaiting rescue. Lieutenant Commander Garner and eight men, using a motor whaleboat and a motor sailing launch, brought off the remaining Cardinal sailors from their perch ashore; later that afternoon, Discoverer transferred the shipwrecked sailors to Cuyama. Rear Admiral Jehu V. Chase, Commander, Fleet Base Force, praised Lieutenant Commander Seran and his crew for their "timely and efficient aid" to the stranded Cardinal. "Your prompt action in reply to this call for assistance," Chase declared, "prior to the possible time of arrival of the U.S.S. Cuyama, was rendered in accordance with the best traditions of that brotherhood of 'men that go down to the sea in ships'."

Completing this tour of duty in Alaskan waters in late September 1925, Discoverer proceeded south and arrived at San Francisco on 10 October 1925. On 12 October 1925, she shifted to Oakland where she underwent voyage repairs and prepared for her next deployment, getting underway for the Hawaiian Islands on 28 December 1925 and reaching Honolulu, Territory of Hawaii, on 5 January 1926. She conducted hydrographic and topographic surveys of the Hawaiian Island chain, ranging as far as French Frigate Shoals and Lisianski Island, near Midway Atoll, through the late summer of 1927.

In the spring of 1928, Discoverer returned to Alaskan waters, where she explored the topography and hydrography of the Alaskan coastline until 1941. Each spring she proceeded north from Seattle and commenced her work for the year, which lasted through the summer and into the autumn. She then returned to Seattle each autumn for routine upkeep and maintenance while her officers and men plotted the data gathered during the year's operations and wrote reports of the work conducted. The ship's Alaskan ports of call included Kodiak, Seward, and Dutch Harbor, among others, and she operated in places such as False Pass, Tigalda Bay, Spruce Island, and Three Brothers' Reef. On 30 June 1930, she again had occasion to assist mariners in distress, when she lent assistance to the Alaska Steamship Company steamship Orduna, which was aground at Granite Mine, Port Wells, Prince William Sound, Alaska.

As Discoverer's years in Alaskan service wore on, the Aleutian Islands became increasingly important to commerce and aviation and, as the United States began to edge closer to war with Japan, to national defense as well, so Discoverer and the other ships in the Coast and Geodetic Survey assigned to Alaska maintained vigorous charting and mapping operations.

== Transfer to U.S. Navy 1941 ==
Between 1939 and 1941, as World War II was fought in Europe prior to the entry of the United States into the war, the U.S. Navy expanded and began to cast about for auxiliary vessels to support its growing number of combatant ships. One of the ships the Navy sought was Discoverer, and an Executive Order of 19 June 1941 authorized the transfer of Discoverer to the Navy for service as a salvage ship.

Operating of Dutch Harbor, Cold Bay, Womens Bay, and Kodiak, Alaska, Discoverer concluded her last operations with the Coast and Geodetic Survey in the summer of 1941. She departed Ketchikan, Alaska, on 22 July 1941, bound for Seattle and turnover to the Navy. Arriving at Seattle on 25 July 1941, Discoverer shifted to Pier 41 at Seattle on the afternoon of 26 August 1941. There, at 1440 hours that day, Lieutenant Commander E. Froberg, USN, accepted custody of the ship.

== Later career ==
Discoverer retained her name in Navy service, becoming USS Discoverer (ARS-3). She operated as a Navy salvage ship in Alaskan waters from 1942 to 1946. She was sold in 1947.

== Commemoration ==
Discoverer Bay at Kodiak Island, Alaska, and Discoverer Island, a small island in that bay, are named for Discoverer.
