= Rodriguez Seamount =

Underwater mountain off California

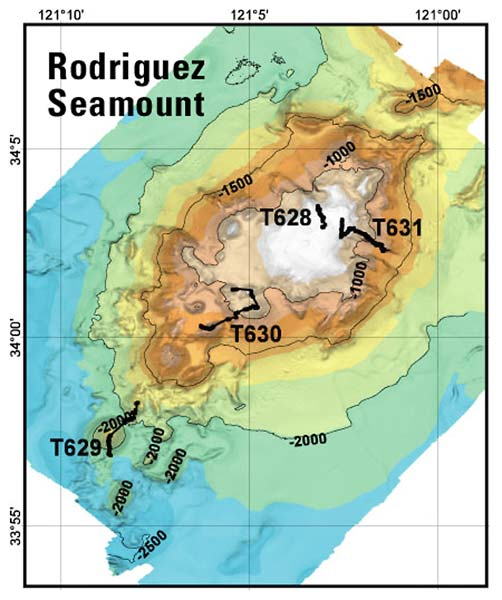
- A perspective bathymetric mapping of Rodriguez Seamount
- A perspective bathymetric mapping of Rodriguez Seamount
- Summit depth: 650 m (2,133 ft)
- Height: 1,675 m (5,495 ft)
- Summit area: >205 km^{3} (49 cu mi)

Location
- Coordinates: 34°01.20′N 121°04.80′W
- Country: Central California, United States

Geology
- Type: Seamount (Guyot)
- Age of rock: 10–12 million years

Rodriguez Seamount is a seamount and guyot located in the Pacific Ocean about 150 km (93 mi; 81 nmi) off the coast of Central California. It is structurally similar to the nearby Guide, Pioneer, Gumdrop, and Davidson seamounts, all located roughly between 37.5° and 34.0° degrees North latitude. This group of seamounts is morphologically unique, and the mounts are very similar to one another. The seamount structures run parallel to an ancient spreading center which has since been replaced in its role by the San Andreas Fault system.

Rodriguez Seamount lies within the boundaries of the Chumash Heritage National Marine Sanctuary. It is named for Juan Rodríguez Cabrillo.

== Geology ==
Magnetic anomalies at Rodriguez indicate that it is located on a 19-million-year-old crustal surface. Rocks recovered from Rodriguez Seamount are largely composed of alkaline basalt and Hawaiite. Ar-Ar dating techniques indicate that the volcano is between 10 and 12 million years of age.

Rodriguez Seamount rises about 1,675 m (5,495 ft) above the surrounding seafloor, to a minimum depth of 650 m (2,133 ft). Its calculated volume is greater than 205 km^{3} (49 cu mi); however this is likely an understatement because the survey did not include its lowermost slope.

The slope is composed mostly of layered volcanic rock, mostly coarse sandstone, with a few scattered large lava boulders. They were likely formed from fragments of volcanic glass formed in the steam explosions of lava touching down against water, similar to the process that is happening today on Kilauea. This would have built a black sand beach over time; however, following millions of years of alterations, most of the sand has since been converted into clay. Small hills, constructed of jagged lava flows, are thought to have resulted from subaerial 'a'a flows.

The northeast-trending ridges, which are common to the group that Rodriquez Seamount is in, are less distinct on Rodriguez than on the other seamounts in the group. In addition, the seamount is propagated by several large volcanic cones, the largest of which is 700 m (2,297 ft) tall and 2.2 km (1.4 mi) at the base, with a volume of about 2.6 km^{3} (1 cu mi). The lower flanks of the volcano have slumped and are covered in a thick layer of sediment, particularly the southwest flank. Another slump area to the west flank has blocky debris on it, suggesting that the base of the volcano has also started collapsing into itself.

Rodriguez Seamount once extended above sea level, resulting in a flat, sediment-covered summit that is coated with beach sands of ancient origin. This flat top earns it the distinction of being a guyot. These sands have been colonized by, among others, sea cucumbers.

An expedition in 2003 included Rodriguez Seamount as one of its destinations. Observations made during the expedition confirmed theories that the seamount had once been above sea level, and has since subsided about 750 m (2,461 ft) from its former height. A sandstone structure discovered at 650 m (2,133 ft) depth seems to hint at a former sand beach and shoreline.
