= USS Robin (AM-3) =

Minesweeper of the United States Navy

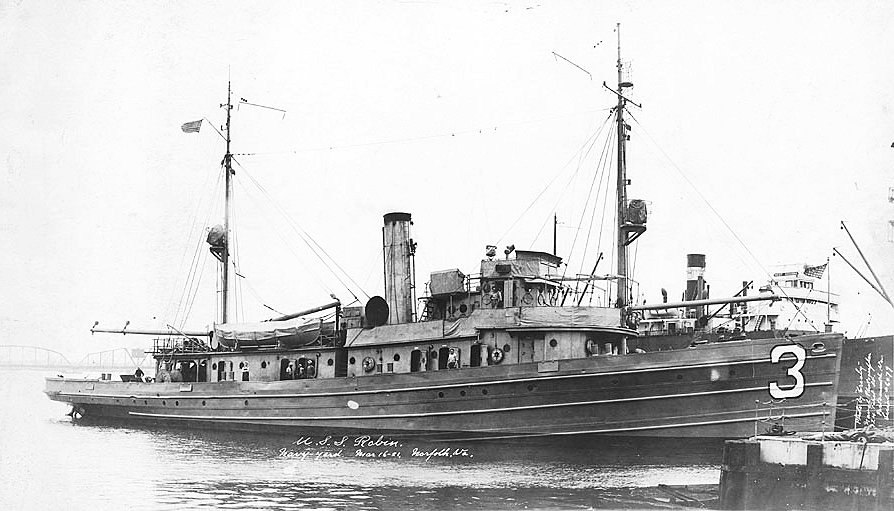

History

United States
- Name: USS Robin
- Builder: Todd Shipyard Co., New York
- Laid down: 4 March 1918
- Launched: 17 June 1918
- Commissioned: 29 August 1918
- Decommissioned: 9 November 1945
- Reclassified: AM-3, 17 July 1920; AT-140, 1 June 1942; ATO-140, 13 April 1944
- Stricken: 28 November 1945
- Fate: Sold for scrap, 1945

General characteristics
- Class & type: Lapwing-class minesweeper
- Displacement: 1,009 long tons (1,025 t) full
- Length: 187 ft 10 in (57.25 m)
- Beam: 35 ft 6 in (10.82 m)
- Draft: 10 ft 4 in (3.15 m)
- Speed: 14 knots (26 km/h; 16 mph)
- Complement: 78
- Armament: 2 × 3 in (76 mm) guns

USS Robin (AM-3) was an Lapwing-class minesweeper acquired by the U.S. Navy for the dangerous task of removing mines from minefields laid in the water to prevent ships from passing.

Robin was named, by the U.S. Navy for the American Robin (Turdus migratorius), a North American thrush with a red breast.

Robin (Minesweeper No. 3) was laid down 4 March 1918 by the Todd Shipyard Corp., New York; launched 17 June 1918; sponsored by Miss Bessie Veronica Callaghan; and commissioned 29 August 1918.

== North Atlantic operations ==
Commissioned at New York, Robin operated in the area, with one run to Hampton Roads, Virginia, until 23 February 1919. By that time the necessity of improving sweeping methods to expedite the clearing of the North Sea Mine Barrage had become very apparent. Robin, with two other minesweepers, tested the feasibility of using sweeps of greater breadth than 500–600 yards. The tests were conducted off Newport, Rhode Island, in late February and early March.

In mid-March, Robin proceeded to Boston, Massachusetts. On 6 April, she got underway for Scotland. On the 20th, she arrived at Inverness and joined the North Sea Mining Detachment. Based at Kirkwall, she participated in the seven operations conducted to clear the barrage of its more than 70,000 mines between Orkney and Norway.

With the conclusion of the final sweep, 19 September, Robin returned to Kirkwall for a brief rest after the difficult assignment, made more hazardous by the strong winds, rough seas, and poor visibility of the North Sea. She departed Scotland 1 October and arrived at New York 19 November.

== Coastal deployments ==
Designated AM-3, 17 July 1920, she operated along the U.S. East Coast for the next 11 years, with winter deployments to the Caribbean. After winter maneuvers in 1932, she continued on to the U.S. West Coast and from her arrival, 6 March, until 9 April 1934 she operated in the San Pedro-San Diego area. During the summer, 1934, she returned to Norfolk, Virginia, but by the end of November was back at San Diego. She remained on the west coast, ranging from Mexico to Alaska and as far west as Hawaii, for the remainder of the decade.

== Pacific Ocean assignment ==
On 7 December 1941 Robin was en route to Hawaii from Johnston Island. She arrived at Pearl Harbor on the 10th and until the end of February 1942 served as a salvage and minesweeping vessel. By 24 February Robin had been sent towing one large and three small lighters to assist in unloading the grounded SS President Taylor at Canton Island. In February, she shifted to small craft and target towing, torpedo retrieving, and passenger and cargo transportation duties. On 1 June 1942, she was officially redesignated as Ocean Tug AT-140.

== World War II Pacific Theatre operations ==
In June 1943, after an extensive overhaul, she joined a convoy for Samoa. She arrived on the 10th and reported for duty as station vessel, Naval Station, Tutuila. Reclassified ATO-140 on 13 April 1944, she operated out of Tutuila until 1945 on towing and salvage assignments which took her to the Ellice Islands and Fiji Islands as well as among the Samoan group. Then, from January to March 1945, she operated among the Marshalls and Gilberts.

On 21 March, Robin departed Majuro for the United States. She arrived at San Diego, California 21 April and two days later shifted to Long Beach, California, for overhaul.

== Decommissioning at war's end ==
Still in the shipyard at the end of the war, she was designated for disposal. She was decommissioned 9 November and struck from the Navy list on the 28th.
