= USS Osprey (AM-29) =

Minesweeper of the United States Navy

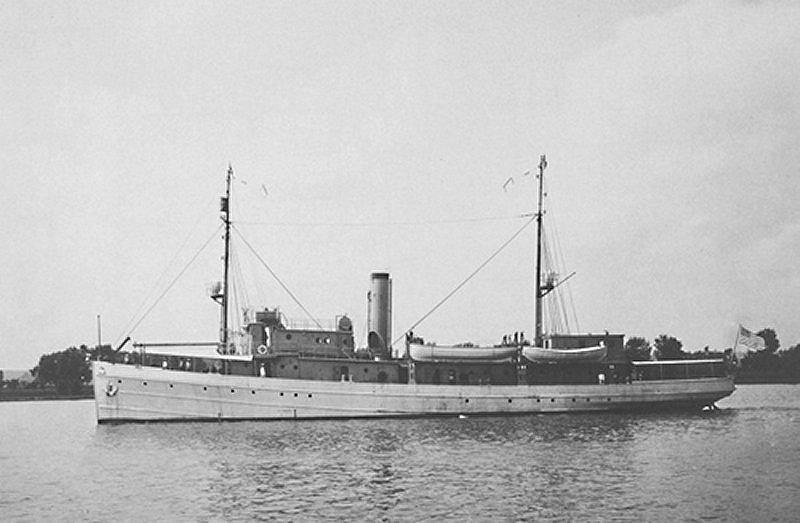
- As USC&GS Pioneer

History

United States
- Name: USS Osprey
- Operator: United States Navy
- Builder: Gas Engine & Power Co. and Charles L. Seabury, Morris Heights, New York
- Laid down: 14 November 1917
- Launched: 14 November 1918
- Commissioned: 7 January 1919, as Minesweeper No. 29
- Decommissioned: 12 December 1920
- Reclassified: AM-29, 17 July 1920
- Fate: Transferred to U.S. Coast and Geodetic Survey 7 April 1922

United States
- Name: USC&GS Pioneer
- Operator: U.S. Coast and Geodetic Survey
- Acquired: 7 April 1922
- Fate: Transferred to U.S. Navy 1941

United States
- Name: USS Crusader (ARS-2)
- Operator: U.S. Navy
- Acquired: 1941
- Recommissioned: 17 September 1941
- Decommissioned: 13 February 1947
- Fate: Sold for scrapping 1952

General characteristics
- Class & type: Lapwing-class minesweeper
- Displacement: 950 long tons (965 t)
- Length: 187 ft 10 in (57.25 m)
- Beam: 35 ft 6 in (10.82 m)
- Draft: 9 ft 9 in (2.97 m)
- Speed: 14 knots (26 km/h; 16 mph)
- Complement: 72
- Armament: 2 × 3 in (76 mm) caliber guns; 2 × machine guns

USS Osprey (AM-29) was an Lapwing-class minesweeper commissioned by the United States Navy for service in World War I. She was responsible for removing mines from harbors, and, in her role as rescue and salvage ship, she was responsible for coming to the aid of stricken vessels. After service in the United States Coast and Geodetic Survey as the survey ship USC&GS Pioneer, she returned to the U.S. Navy in 1941 as the salvage ship USS Crusader (ARS-2), serving as such through the end of World War II.

== Construction and commissioning ==
Osprey was laid down on 14 November 1917 by the Gas Engine and Power Company & Charles L. Seabury Company at Morris Heights, Bronx, New York. She was launched on 14 November 1918, sponsored by Mrs. J. J. Amory, and commissioned on 7 January 1919 as USS Osprey (Minesweeper No. 29).

== European operations ==
After fitting out at New York City, Osprey departed Boston, Massachusetts, with five other ships on 6 April 1919 for Inverness, Scotland, arriving 20 April 1919 to join the North Sea Minesweeping Force. Basing operations at Kirkwall in the Orkney Islands, she aided in sweeping the North Sea Mine Barrage during the summer of 1919, departing Kirkwall on 1 October 1919 for Devonport, England. She departed Brest, France, for Lisbon, Portugal, on 15 October 1919 with the submarine chaser USS SC-110 in tow. She departed Lisbon on 24 October 1919 for the United States, arriving at Staten Island, New York, on 17 November 1919. On 4 December 1919 she proceeded to the Portsmouth Navy Yard in Kittery, Maine, where she remained in ordinary — becoming USS Osprey (AM-29) when the U.S. Navy adopted its modern hull-number system on 17 July 1920 — until she was decommissioned 12 December 1920. She subsequently steamed to Boston.

== United States Coast and Geodetic Survey service ==
The ship was transferred to the United States Coast and Geodetic Survey in the United States Department of Commerce on 7 April 1922, at which time she was renamed USC&GS Pioneer. She operated as a survey ship in the Coast and Geodetic Survey until 1941.

== Return to the U.S. Navy ==
The ship was transferred back to the U.S. Navy and commissioned on 17 September 1941 as the salvage ship USS Crusader (ARS-2). She operated in the 15th Naval District, headquartered at Balboa, Panama Canal Zone, throughout World War II, which ended in August 1945.

== Decommissioning and disposal ==
After decommissioning, Crusader was transferred to the Maritime Commission on 13 February 1947. She was sold for scrapping in 1952.
