= Pioneer Seamount =

Undersea mountain off California

- Location within California
- Summit depth: 820 m (2,690 ft)
- Height: 1,930 m (6,332 ft)
- Summit area: 12.8 km (6.9 nautical miles)x12.8 km (6.9 nautical miles)

Location
- Location: offshore Central California
- Coordinates: 37°21.1′N 123°26.1′W
- Country: United States

Geology
- Type: Seamount (underwater volcano)
- Volcanic arc/chain: Central Californian seamounts
- Age of rock: 10.9 to 11.1 million years

Pioneer Seamount is an undersea mountain, or seamount, in the Pacific Ocean off the coast of central California.

== Location ==
Pioneer Seamount is located at 37° 21.1' North Latitude, 123° 26.1' West Longitude, at the base of the continental slope of North America about 95 kilometers (59 miles) off the coast just southwest of San Francisco, California.

== Physical characteristics ==
The seamount is a volcano between 10.9 and 11.1 million years old. It is about 12.8 kilometers (8.0 miles) long as well as about 12.8 kilometers (8.0 miles) wide, and has a volume of about 135 cubic kilometres (32 cubic miles). It rises about 1,930 meters (6,330 feet) above the surrounding ocean floor, and its peak is a minimum of 820 meters (2,690 feet) below the ocean's surface. Samples from the seamount consist of highly vesicular alkalic basalt, hawaiite, and mugearite.

The seamount and its volcano once extended above the sea surface, but eroded and sank as the seamount and the seabed at its base were carried further away from the spreading center from which it presumably originated.

== Biological environment ==
A wide variety of sealife lives on the seamount. Corals dominate in deeper areas and sponges in its shallower parts.

== Naming ==
Pioneer Seamount was named for USC&GS Pioneer, the first of three survey ships of the United States Coast and Geodetic Survey to bear the name. Pioneer operated along the United States West Coast and in the then-Territory of Alaska during her Coast and Geodetic Survey career, which lasted from 1922 to 1941.
